= Montgomery Township, Gibson County, Indiana =

Montgomery Township Gibson County
- Township
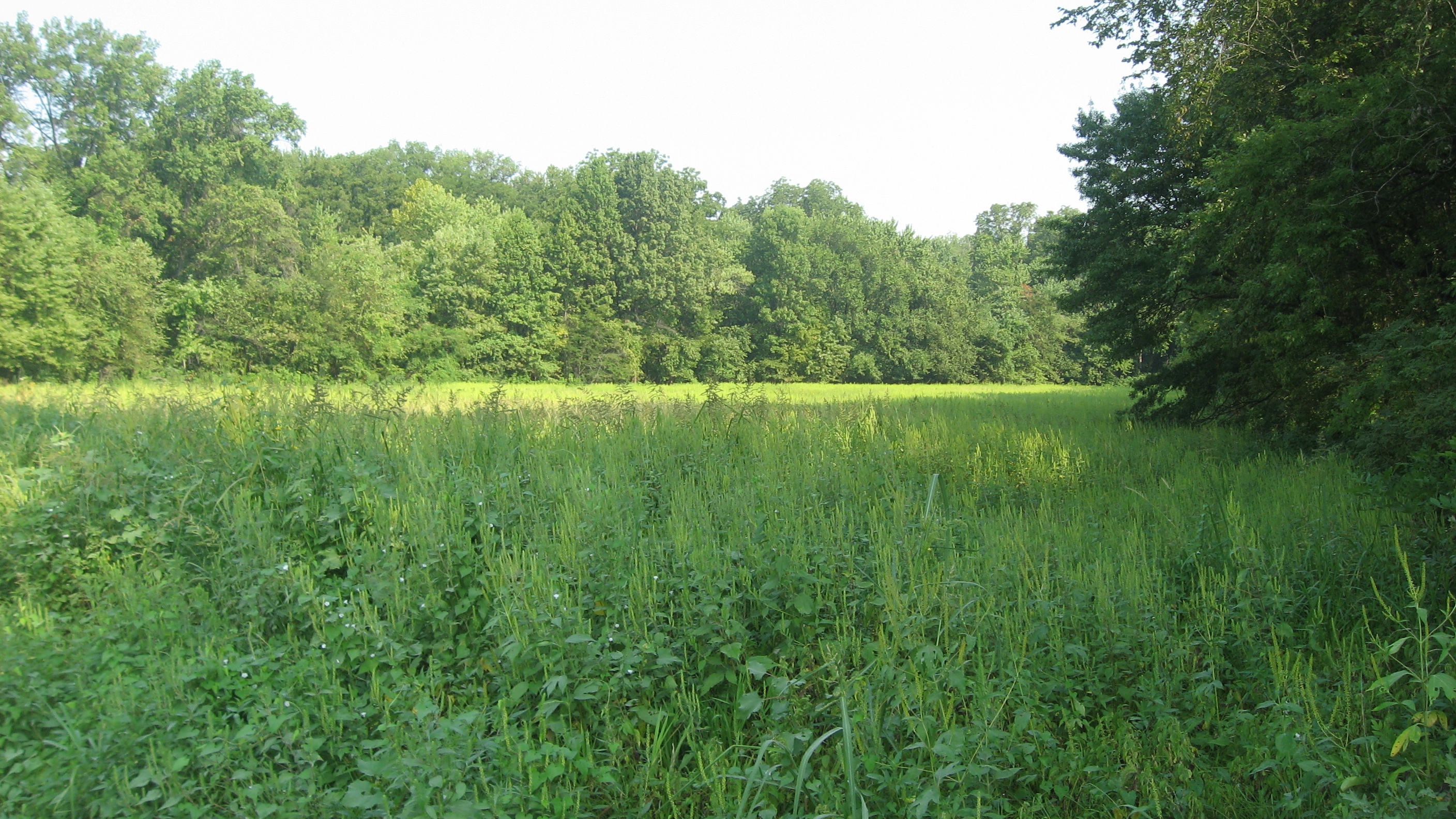
- A field in northwestern Montgomery Township

- Location of Montgomery Township in Gibson County
- Coordinates: 38°17′15″N 87°43′46″W
- Country: United States
- State: Indiana
- County: Gibson
- School District: South Gibson School Corporation
- Named for: Thomas Montgomery

Government
  - Type: Indiana township
  - Trustee: DeWayne Wade

Area
  - Total: 97.2 sq mi (252 km^{2})
  - Land: 91.64 sq mi (237.3 km^{2})
  - Water: 5.56 sq mi (14.4 km^{2})
- Elevation (average): 440 ft (134 m)

Population (2020)
  - Total: 4,020
  - Density: 43.9/sq mi (16.9/km^{2})
- Time zone: UTC-6 (CST)
  - Summer (DST): UTC-5 (CDT)
- ZIP code: 47665
- Area code(s): 812 & 930
- FIPS code: 18-50706
- GNIS feature ID: 453649
- Largest Township in area in Gibson County. Encompasses slightly less than 1/5 of county's total area.

Montgomery Township is the largest (in area) of the ten townships in Gibson County, Indiana as well as one of the largest townships by area in Southwestern Indiana, USA. At the 2020 census, its population was 4,020 (up from 3,996 in 2010) and it contained 1,624 housing units, 75% of which were in areas adjacent to Owensville. Montgomery Township is served by the South Gibson School Corporation. Gibson Generating Station and Gibson Lake are located at the northern end of Montgomery Township.

Historical population
Census	Pop.	Note	%±
1890	3,557		—
1900	4,196		18.0%
1910	4,279		2.0%
1920	3,845		−10.1%
1930	3,354		−12.8%
1940	3,575		6.6%
1950	3,146		−12.0%
1960	2,948		−6.3%
1970	2,760		−6.4%
1980	3,112		12.8%
1990	3,133		0.7%
2000	3,698		18.0%
2010	3,996		8.1%
2020	4,020		0.6%
Source: US Decennial Census

== Geography ==
According to the 2010 census, the township had a total area of 97.2 square miles (252 km^{2}), of which 91.64 square miles (237.3 km^{2}) (or 94.28%) is land and 5.56 square miles (14.4 km^{2}) (or 5.72%) is water. Lakes in the township include Broad Pond (Gibson Lake), Burnett's Pond and Mauck's Pond. The Wabash River borders the northwest township line.

== History ==
"Purty Old Tom" is noted by the historian Gil R. Stormont as the origin of the name for the township, one of the original six created by the commissioners of the newly formed county in 1813. Thomas "Purty Old Tom" Montgomery came to southern Knox County in 1805 and marked an oak tree near a spring. Something delayed his return with his family to claim that land, so he ended up settling on the west bank of Black River near the present site of Owensville. He is mentioned on the Gibson County and Montgomery County, Kentucky page. He was one of seven sons of Hugh Montgomery Sr., of Virginia to fight in the Revolutionary War.

== Cities and towns ==
- Owensville

=== Unincorporated towns ===
- Egg Harbor
- Johnson
- Skelton

(This list is based on USGS data and may include former settlements.)

=== Adjacent townships and Precincts ===
- Indiana
  - Gibson County
    - Patoka Township (northeast)
    - White River Township (northeast)
    - Union Township (east)
    - Johnson Township (southeast)
    - Wabash Township (west)
  - Posey County
    - Smith Township (south)
    - Robb Township (southwest)
- Illinois
  - Wabash County
    - Coffee Precinct (Single point to the northwest)
    - Mt. Carmel Precinct (northwest)

=== Cemeteries ===
The township contains ten cemeteries: Montgomery, Smith, Benson, Clark, Knowles, Mauck, Oak Grove, Old Union, Skelton, Owensville and Wilson.

=== Major highways ===
- Indiana State Road 64
- Indiana State Road 65
- Indiana State Road 165
- Indiana State Road 168

== Education ==
- Owensville Community School
