= Black River (Indiana) =

Physical characteristics
- Source
  - location: Montgomery Township, Gibson County, Indiana
  - coordinates: 38°14′27″N 87°41′43″W
  - elevation: 443 ft (135 m)
- Mouth
  - location: Bethel Township, Posey County, Indiana
  - coordinates: 38°10′27″N 87°55′15″W
  - elevation: 371 ft (113 m)
- Length: 20 mi (32 km)

Basin features
- Progression: Black River → Wabash → Ohio → Mississippi → Gulf of Mexico
- GNIS ID: 431139

The Black River is a 19.6-mile-long (31.5 km) river with headwaters located just south of Owensville, Indiana. It flows southwest through southwestern Gibson County and northwestern Posey County under Interstate 64 between Poseyville and Griffin before emptying into the Wabash River just north of New Harmony.

== See also ==
- List of rivers of Indiana
