= Wabash Township, Gibson County, Indiana =

Wabash Township Gibson County
- Township
- Location within Gibson County
- Coordinates: 38°16′15″N 87°52′16″W
- Country: United States
- State: Indiana
- County: Gibson
- Township Seat: (None); Owensville in Montgomery Township serves as seat.
- Settlements: Crawleyville; Jimtown
- School District: South Gibson School Corporation
- Named for: Wabash River

Government
  - Type: Indiana township

Area
  - Total: 37.99 sq mi (98.4 km^{2})
  - Land: 35.5 sq mi (92 km^{2})
  - Water: 2.49 sq mi (6.4 km^{2})
- Elevation: 381 ft (116 m)

Population (2020)
  - Total: 52
  - Density: 1.5/sq mi (0.57/km^{2})
- Time zone: UTC-6 (CST)
  - Summer (DST): UTC-5 (CDT)
- ZIP codes: 47665, 47616, 47633
- Area code: 812
- FIPS code: 18-79298
- GNIS feature ID: 453964
- One of only two townships without a ZIP code of its own. One of only two townships without a township seat.

Wabash Township is one of ten townships in Gibson County, Indiana, United States. As of the 2020 census, its population was 52 (up from 30 at 2010) and it contained 22 housing units. Wabash Township has no organized seat within the township, as the only settlement is in two river camps Crawleyville and Jimtown. The township seat is Owensville, in Montgomery Township. This area is occasionally referred to as the "Tail of Gibson County", owing to its shape and position within the county. Nevertheless, the township is a panhandle of Gibson County, bordered by the Wabash River to the north, northwest, west, and in some parts, east, even southeast, and by Posey County to the south.

Wabash Township was established in 1838, and named from the Wabash River.

Historical population
Census	Pop.	Note	%±
1890	802		—
1900	1,076		34.2%
1910	951		−11.6%
1920	647		−32.0%
1930	437		−32.5%
1940	563		28.8%
1950	299		−46.9%
1960	209		−30.1%
1970	139		−33.5%
1980	88		−36.7%
1990	55		−37.5%
2000	44		−20.0%
2010	30		−31.8%
2020	52		73.3%
Source: US Decennial Census

== Geography ==
According to the 2010 census, the township has a total area of 37.99 square miles (98.4 km^{2}), of which 35.5 square miles (92 km^{2}) (or 93.45%) is land and 2.49 square miles (6.4 km^{2}) (or 6.55%) is water. Lakes in this township include Foote Pond and Goose Pond.

=== Unincorporated towns ===
- Crawleyville
- Hickory Ridge
- Jimtown

(This list is based on USGS data and may include former settlements.)

=== Adjacent townships and precincts ===
Gibson County

- Montgomery Township (East)

Posey County

- Robb Township (Southeast)
- Bethel Township (Southwest)

Wabash County, IL

- Coffee Precinct (Northeast)
- Compton Precinct (Northwest)

White County, IL

- Gray Township (West)

== Education ==
Wabash Township is served by the South Gibson School Corporation, although optional attendance is available for the MSD of North Posey.
