= Rapture, Indiana =

- Unincorporated community
- Location within the state of Indiana Rapture (the United States)
- Coordinates: 38°9′8″N 87°50′31″W
- Country: United States
- State: Indiana
- County: Posey
- Township: Harmony
- Elevation: 436 ft (133 m)
- Time zone: UTC-6 (Central (CST))
  - Summer (DST): UTC-5 (CDT)
- ZIP code: 47633
- Area codes: 812, 930
- GNIS feature ID: 441777

Rapture is an unincorporated community in Harmony Township, Posey County, in the U.S. state of Indiana.

== History ==
Rapture was originally called "White's Settlement", and is one of the oldest communities in Posey County. It was laid out in 1838 by John Cox, and became known as "Winfield", and also "Bugtown". The present name of Rapture may have come from a local horse. Cox Creek runs through the community.

A post office was established at Rapture in 1892, and remained in operation until it was discontinued in 1902.

CNN reported in 2011 that just one person lives in Rapture, where they own a home, rental property and airplane hangar. The airplane landing strip is known as "Bugtown Airport".

Rapture was the setting for Terence Faherty's 1999 novel The Ordained.

== Geography ==
Rapture is located on Indiana State Road 68, between Poseyville and New Harmony.
