= Indiana State Road 68 =

State highway in Indiana, United States

State Road 68
- SR 68 highlighted in red

Route information
- Maintained by INDOT
- Length: 52.927 mi (85.178 km)
- Existed: 1931–present

Major junctions
- West end: SR 69 near New Harmony
- US 41 at Haubstadt; I-69 near Elberfeld; SR 57 near Elberfeld; SR 61 in Lynnville
- East end: US 231 / SR 62 at Dale

Location
- Country: United States
- State: Indiana
- Counties: Gibson, Posey, Spencer, Warrick

Highway system
- Indiana State Highway System; Interstate; US; State; Scenic
← SR 67	→ I-69

State Road 68 in the U.S. state of Indiana is a 53-mile (85 km) route in Gibson, Posey, Spencer and Warrick counties.

== Route description ==
State Road 68 begins in New Harmony at State Road 69 and runs east, passing through the towns of Poseyville, Cynthiana, Haubstadt, Lynnville and Selvin. State Road 68 nearly parallels Interstate 64, but although it passes over the interstate twice, there is no direct interchange. However, as of 2008, it has an interchange with Interstate 69, making it one of the few roads in the state to cross both the state level equivalent and the Interstate equivalent, in this case being 69. It ends at US 231 in the town of Dale.

== Major intersections ==
County	Location	mi	km	Destinations	Notes
Posey	Harmony Township	0.000	0.000	SR 69 – New Harmony, Griffin	Western terminus of SR 68
Posey	Poseyville	6.425	10.340	SR 165 south	Western end of SR 165 concurrency
Posey	Poseyville	7.399	11.908	SR 165 north to I-64	Eastern end of SR 165 concurrency
Posey	Cynthiana	11.813	19.011	SR 65 south to I-64	Western end of SR 65 concurrency
Posey	Cynthiana	13.204	21.250	SR 65 north – Owensville	Eastern end of SR 65 concurrency
Gibson	Haubstadt	21.398	34.437	US 41 – Princeton, Evansville	
Gibson–Warrick county line	Johnson–Greer township line	25.765– 25.888	41.465– 41.663	I-69 / SR 57 south – Evansville, Indianapolis	Western end of SR 57 concurrency
Warrick	Greer Township	26.404	42.493	SR 57 north – Petersburg	Eastern end of SR 57 concurrency
Warrick	Lynnville	35.235	56.705	SR 61 – Boonville	
Warrick	Pigeon Township	46.651	75.078	SR 161 south – Tennyson	Western end of SR 161 concurrency
Warrick	Pigeon Township	50.122	80.664	SR 161 north to I-64	Eastern end of SR 161 concurrnecy
Spencer	Dale	52.927	85.178	US 231 / SR 62 – Huntingburg, Rockport	Eastern terminus of SR 68
1.000 mi = 1.609 km; 1.000 km = 0.621 mi: Concurrency terminus
