= Indiana State Road 66 =

Highway in Indiana

State Road 66
- SR 66 highlighted in red

Route information
- Maintained by INDOT
- Length: 150.862 mi (242.789 km)
- Existed: October 1, 1926–present

Major junctions
- West end: SR 69 in Harmony Township
- US 41 in Evansville; I-69 in Evansville; US 231 in Rockport
- East end: US 150 in Hardinsburg

Location
- Country: United States
- State: Indiana
- Counties: Posey, Vanderburgh, Warrick, Spencer, Perry, Crawford, Washington

Highway system
- Indiana State Highway System; Interstate; US; State; Scenic
| ← SR 65 | → SR 67 |

State Road 66 is an east–west highway in seven counties in the southernmost portion of the U.S. state of Indiana.

== Route description ==
State Road 66 begins at the eastern end of a toll bridge over the Wabash River in New Harmony and ends at U.S. Route 150 east of Hardinsburg. It is a divided limited-access highway in the metropolitan Evansville area, where it is part of the Lloyd Expressway, and also between the unincorporated communities of Yankeetown and Hatfield. For the most part, however, State Road 66 is undivided rural highway following the Ohio River, and a large portion of its route (from just east of Newburgh to State Road 62 at Sulphur) carries the designation of the Ohio River Scenic Byway.

== History ==
=== Lloyd Expressway ===
Within the city of Evansville, the portion of SR 66 east of US 41 is known as the Lloyd Expressway. It is named in honor of former Mayor Russell G. Lloyd, Sr., who was assassinated after leaving office in 1980. In the spring of 1983, buildings in the expressway's path began coming down and construction officially started on July 29, 1983. Motorists endured five years of detours and construction as the expressway was built through the heart of the city.

=== Major widening ===
Increasing traffic on the segment of State Road 66 between Evansville and the Alcoa plant east of Newburgh has led the Indiana Department of Transportation to widen the road (eventually being capable of expansion to six lanes) from State Road 261 to the western end of the present Yankeetown-Hatfield four-lane segment.

As of March 2009, work was well underway on the segment from State Road 261 to the Newburgh Lock & Dam. By the end of 2010, the project was complete from State Road 261 to French Island Trail (formerly Indiana State Road 662), and work was progressing from that point east beyond Indiana State Road 61 to the existing four-lane stretch near Yankeetown.

== Major intersections ==
| County | Location | mi | km | Destinations | Notes |
|---|---|---|---|---|---|
| Posey | Harmony Township | 0.000 | 0.000 | SR 69 – Griffin | Western end of SR 66 |
| Posey | Wadesville | 6.723 | 10.820 | SR 165 north – Poseyville | Southern terminus of SR 165 |
| Vanderburgh | German Township | 15.399 | 24.782 | University Parkway | |
| Vanderburgh | German Township | 17.627 | 28.368 | SR 65 north – Cynthiana | Southern terminus of SR 65 |
| Vanderburgh | Evansville | 23.698 | 38.138 | US 41 north – Vincennes | Western end of US 41 concurrency |
| Vanderburgh | Evansville | 24.204 | 38.953 | SR 62 east – Boonville | Western end of SR 62 concurrency |
| Vanderburgh | Evansville | 25.286 | 40.694 | US 41 south / SR 62 west – Mt. Vernon, Henderson | Southern end of US 41 concurrency and Eastern end of SR 62 concurrency |
| Vanderburgh | Evansville | 29.894 | 48.110 | I-69 – Evansville, Indianapolis | |
| Warrick | Ohio Township | 33.571 | 54.027 | SR 261 north – Boonville | Southern terminus of SR 261 |
| Warrick | Anderson Township | 39.745 | 63.963 | SR 61 north – Boonville | Southern terminus of SR 61 |
| Spencer | Hatfield | 48.750 | 78.456 | SR 161 north – Holland | Western end of SR 161 concurrency |
| Spencer | Reo | 52.008 | 83.699 | SR 161 south Owensboro | Eastern end of SR 161 concurrency |
| Spencer | Rockport | 56.540– 56.832 | 90.992– 91.462 | US 231 – Dale, Owensboro | |
| Spencer | Huff Township | 69.275 | 111.487 | SR 70 west | Eastern terminus of western section of SR 70 |
| Perry | Troy | 72.408 | 116.529 | SR 545 north | Southern terminus of SR 545 |
| Perry | Tell City | 75.500 | 121.505 | SR 37 begins | Southern terminus of SR 37; southern end of SR 37 concurrency |
| Perry | Tell City | 75.787 | 121.967 | SR 37 north – English | Northern of SR 37 concurrency |
| Perry | Cannelton | 80.088 | 128.889 | SR 237 - Hawesville | |
| Perry | Tobin Township | 84.420 | 135.861 | SR 166 east – Tobinsport | Western terminus of SR 166 |
| Perry | Derby | 101.584 | 163.484 | SR 70 west | Eastern terminus of SR 70. |
| Crawford | Sulphur | 120.090 | 193.266 | SR 62 west / SR 237 north – St. Croix, English | Western end of SR 62 concurrency; southern terminus of SR 237 |
| Crawford | Leavenworth | 127.931 | 205.885 | SR 62 east – Corydon | Eastern end of SR 62 concurrency |
| Crawford | Jennings Township | 130.555– 130.705 | 210.108– 210.349 | I-64 – Evansville, Louisville | Exit 92 on I-64 |
| Crawford | Marengo | 140.111 | 225.487 | SR 64 west – English | Western end of SR 64 concurrency |
| Crawford | Milltown | 143.799 | 231.422 | SR 64 east – Georgetown | Western end of SR 64 concurrency |
| Washington | Hardinsburg | 150.862 | 242.789 | US 150 – Paoli, New Albany | Eastern terminus of SR 66 |
1.000 mi = 1.609 km; 1.000 km = 0.621 mi: Concurrency terminus
