= Smith Township, Posey County, Indiana =

Smith Township Posey County
- Township
- Coordinates: 38°09′47″N 87°43′13″W
- Country: United States
- State: Indiana
- County: Posey

Government
  - Type: Indiana township

Area
  - Total: 21.21 sq mi (54.94 km^{2})
  - Land: 21.21 sq mi (54.93 km^{2})
  - Water: 0.0039 sq mi (0.01 km^{2})
- Elevation: 436 ft (133 m)

Population (2020)
  - Total: 1,119
  - Density: 52.76/sq mi (20.37/km^{2})
- FIPS code: 18-70164
- GNIS feature ID: 453852

Smith Township is one of ten townships in Posey County, Indiana, USA. At the 2020 census, its population was 1,119.

Historical population
Census	Pop.	Note	%±
1890	1,173		—
1900	1,226		4.5%
1910	1,362		11.1%
1920	1,159		−14.9%
1930	1,109		−4.3%
1940	1,065		−4.0%
1950	1,204		13.1%
1960	1,200		−0.3%
1970	1,411		17.6%
1980	1,479		4.8%
1990	1,277		−13.7%
2000	1,292		1.2%
2010	1,102		−14.7%
2020	1,119		1.5%
Source: US Decennial Census

== History ==
Smith Township was organized in 1817. The township was named for George Smith, a pioneer settler.

== Adjacent townships ==
- Posey County
  - Center Township
  - Robb Township
  - Robinson Township
- Gibson County
  - Johnson Township
  - Montgomery Township
- Vanderburgh County
  - Armstrong Township

== Towns ==
- Cynthiana

== Education ==
It is within the Metropolitan School District of North Posey County, which operates North Posey High School.
