= Parkers Settlement, Indiana =

- Census-designated place
- Location of Parkers Settlement in Posey County, Indiana.
- Coordinates: 38°02′38″N 87°42′53″W
- Country: United States
- State: Indiana
- County: Posey
- Township: Robinson

Area
  - Total: 1.75 sq mi (4.54 km^{2})
  - Land: 1.75 sq mi (4.54 km^{2})
  - Water: 0 sq mi (0.00 km^{2})
- Elevation: 430 ft (130 m)

Population (2020)
  - Total: 661
  - Density: 377.3/sq mi (145.68/km^{2})
- Time zone: UTC-6 (Central (CST))
  - Summer (DST): UTC-5 (CDT)
- ZIP code: 47712
- Area codes: 812, 930
- GNIS feature ID: 2629885

Parkers Settlement is an unincorporated community and census-designated place in Robinson Township, Posey County, in the U.S. state of Indiana. As of the 2020 census, Parkers Settlement had a population of 661.

== History ==
A post office was established at Parkers Settlement in 1851, and remained in operation until it was discontinued in 1902.

The U.S. Census Bureau began designating Parkers Settlement as a CDP in the 2010 U.S. census.

== Geography ==
Parkers Settlement is located near the end of the Diamond Avenue stretch of Indiana 66.

== Education ==
It is within the Metropolitan School District of North Posey County, which operates North Posey High School.

== Demographics ==
Historical population
Census	Pop.	Note	%±
2020	661		—
U.S. Decennial Census
