= WSDM =

WSDM may refer to:

- Web Services Distributed Management
- WSDM (FM), a radio station (90.1 FM) licensed to serve Wadesville, Indiana, United States
- WENS (FM), a defunct radio station (89.7 FM) formerly licensed to serve Liberty, Indiana, which held the call sign WSDM in 2012
- WFNF (FM), a radio station (92.7 FM) licensed to serve Brazil, Indiana, which held the call sign WSDM-FM from 1985 to 2012
- WCKL (FM), a radio station (97.9 FM) licensed to serve Chicago, Illinois, which held the call sign WSDM from 1965 to 1977
