= WENS =

WENS may refer to:

- WENS (FM), a defunct radio station (89.7 FM) formerly licensed to serve Liberty, Indiana, United States
- WENS-LP, a defunct low-power radio station (96.9 FM) formerly licensed to serve Vine Grove, Kentucky, United States
- WSDM (FM), a radio station (90.1 FM) licensed to serve Wadesville, Indiana, which held the call sign WENS from 2007 to 2012
- WLHK, a radio station (97.1 FM) licensed to serve Shelbyville, Indiana, which formerly used the call sign WENS
- WENS (TV), a television station (channel 16) licensed to serve Pittsburgh, Pennsylvania, United States, which operated from 1953 to 1957
