= Blairsville, Indiana =

- Unincorporated area
- Location within Indiana Location within the United States
- Coordinates: 38°04′46″N 87°45′47″W
- Country: United States
- State: Indiana
- County: Posey
- Township: Robinson
- Elevation: 413 ft (126 m)
- Time zone: UTC-6 (Central (CST))
  - Summer (DST): UTC-5 (CDT)
- ZIP code: 47638
- Area codes: 812, 930
- GNIS feature ID: 2830500

Blairsville is an unincorporated area in Robinson Township, Posey County, in the U.S. state of Indiana.

As of 2023 the U.S. Census Bureau had established a census-designated place for this settlement.

== History ==
Blairsville was laid out in 1837 by Stephen Blair, and named for him. A post office was established at Blairsville in 1838, and remained in operation until 1902. With the construction of the railroad in 1880, business activity shifted to nearby Wadesville, and the town declined.

Blairsville contains the historic Blairsville Cemetery. A number of the interments are Civil War veterans.

The town of Blairsville is located on Big creek in Robinson township. It was named in honor of Stephen Blair who, in company with Ebenezer Phillips, laid out the town on the Fourth of July, 1837. It soon grew into prominence as a half way place on the Evansville and New Harmony stage road, besides it was fairly well located for the convenience of settlers in all directions from the town as a trading point.

Political speakings were held here quite often in the old days of the Whig and the Democrat. A joint discussion was held here during the campaign of 1842 between Robert Dale Owen, the Democratic candidate for Congress, and John W. Payne, the Whig candidate. Among the first residents of Blairsville were Stephen Blair, after whom the town was named, Ebenezer Phillips, who surveyed the town, Charles Kimball, a Robert Owen and later a Dr. Mitchell, Henry Theuerkauf and Henry Weber, shoemakers. Henry Newman was one of the first blacksmiths. Charles Kimball ran a horse feed mill. Dr. Owen refers to the areas surrounding Blairsville as "the mecca of geologists" due to the preservation of fossilized palm trees and Lepidodendron. John B. Gardner and John Becker were among the early successful merchants and business men. The extension of the Evansville & Terre Haute railroad through Wadesville in 1880 was a severe blow to Blairsville from which the town never recovered. For several years the population has been composed largely, if not entirely, of Germans. The importance of the town in 1842 may be judged by the fact that the following petitioned the "honorable board" for tavern licenses (which meant to sell whiskey also): J. H. Owens, Daniel Cox, William Watson, David R. Downen, M. Duty, Robert Stevens, William Dodge, Nelson Doty, Daniel Elkins, Benjamin Garris, Soren Sorenson, M. Watson, H. W. Young, William F. Phillips and Richard Ramsey.

On April 2, 2024, an EF-2 Tornado with peak winds of 115 mph passed through the vicinity of Blairsville.

== Demographics ==
The United States Census Bureau delineated Blairsville as a census designated place in the 2022 American Community Survey.'

== Education ==
Robinson Township is in Metropolitan School District of North Posey County.

South Terrace Elementary School is in Blairsville. The district was scheduled to begin building this school in fall 1957. 10 classrooms were planned to be built.

North Posey High School is the district's comprehensive high school.
