= WRFM =

WRFM may refer to:

- WRFM (FM), a radio station (103.9 FM) licensed to Drakesboro, Kentucky
- WNAP (990 AM), a defunct radio station (990 AM) formerly licensed to Muncie, Indiana, which held the call sign WRFM from 2007 to 2019
- WSDM (FM), a radio station (90.1 FM) licensed to Wadesville, Indiana, which held the call sign WRFM from 2003 to 2007
- WAWR, a radio station (93.5 FM) licensed to Remsen, New York, which used the WRFM call letters from 1996 to 2003
- WACC (AM), a radio station (830 AM) licensed to Hialeah, Florida, which used the WRFM call letters from 1987 to 1995
- WRMA, a radio station (95.7 FM) licensed to North Miami Beach, Florida, which used the WRFM call letters from 1986 to 1987
- WWPR-FM, a radio station (105.1 FM) licensed to New York, New York, which used the WRFM call letters from 1957 to 1986
