= Stewartsville =

Stewartsville may refer to:

- Stewartsville, Indiana, an unincorporated community
- Stewartsville, Missouri, a city
- Stewartsville, New Jersey, an unincorporated community
- Stewartsville, Ohio, an unincorporated community
- Stewartsville, Virginia, a census-designated place

== See also ==
- Stewartville (disambiguation)
