= Indiana State Road 65 =

Highway in Indiana

State Road 65
- SR 65 highlighted in red

Route information
- Maintained by INDOT
- Length: 47.74 mi (76.83 km)
- Existed: October 1, 1926–present

Major junctions
- South end: SR 66 at Evansville
- I-64 near Cynthiana; US 41 in Princeton
- North end: SR 56 near Hazleton

Location
- Country: United States
- State: Indiana
- Counties: Gibson, Pike, Posey, Vanderburgh

Highway system
- Indiana State Highway System; Interstate; US; State; Scenic
← I-65	→ SR 66

State Road 65 crosses in four counties in the southwest portion of the U.S. state of Indiana.

== Route description ==
State Road 65 begins at State Road 66 west of Evansville. It arcs to the northwest to the town of Cynthiana and State Road 68, then proceeds north through Owensville to State Road 64. It shares this route east into Princeton to the Gibson County Courthouse Square where it turns north then proceeds northeast to its terminus at State Road 56 west of Petersburg, just inside Pike County.

== Major intersections ==
County	Location	mi	km	Destinations	Notes
Vanderburgh	German Township	0.00	0.00	SR 66 – New Harmony, Evansville	Southern terminus of SR 66
Vanderburgh	Armstrong Township	10.95	17.62	I-64 - St. Louis, Louisville	Exit number 18 on I-64
Posey	Cynthiana	13.56	21.82	SR 68 west – Poseyville	Southern end of SR 68 concurrency
Posey	Smith Township	14.95	24.06	SR 68 east – Haubstadt	Northern end of SR 68 concurrency
Gibson	Owensville			SR 168 east – Fort Branch	Western terminus of SR 168
Gibson	Owensville			SR 165 south – Poseyville	Northern terminus of SR 165
Gibson	Patoka Township	26.29	42.31	SR 64 west - Mt. Carmel	Western end of SR 64 concurrency
Gibson	Princeton			US 41 – Evansville, Vincennes	
Gibson	Princeton	32.84	52.85	SR 64 east – Oakland City	Eastern end of SR 64 concurrency
Pike	Clay Township	47.74	76.83	SR 56 – Petersburg	Northern terminus of SR 65
1.000 mi = 1.609 km; 1.000 km = 0.621 mi: Concurrency terminus
