= Metropolitan School District of North Posey County =

School district in Indiana

Location
- 101 N Church Street; Poseyville, Indiana Posey County; Southwestern Indiana United States

District information
- Grades: K–12
- Superintendent: Michael Galvin

Students and staff
- Students: 1,380
- Teachers: 107
- Athletic conference: Pocket Athletic Conference
- District mascot: Viking
- Colors: Red & Black

Other information
- Website: MSD of North Posey

The Metropolitan School District of North Posey County, Indiana, commonly known as the MSD of North Posey, is the school corporation serving northern Posey County, Indiana.

The school district covers six townships in northern Posey County, which are: Bethel, Center, Harmony, Robb, Robinson and Smith. The school district also includes the towns of Poseyville, New Harmony, Cynthiana and Griffin. The census-designated place of Parkers Settlement is in the district. Other unincorporated communities in the district include Wadesville, Stewartsville, St. Wendel, and Blairsville.

== History ==
Previously Posey County had a county school system, but it transitioned to a metropolitan school district system.

Representatives from Robb School Township, Smith School Township and Center-Robinson Consolidated Schools first met in Poseyville on July 28, 1956, and agreed to reorganize their districts into a single metropolitan school district. It was also agreed than Bethel School Township would be allowed to join the new school district any time it decided to do so. This decision was confirmed by a referendum on October 1, 1956. The referendum was held because there were people opposed to the school district consolidations who submitted official documents opposing them. The Metropolitan School District of North Posey County was formally created and named at a meeting in Wadesville on November 2, 1956. Other names suggested at the meeting for the new district were "Quintet" and "North Central".

In 1956, Eldon R. Crawford, previously the superintendent of Posey County Schools, became the superintendent of the North Posey County school district. He resigned from the former position after taking the latter.

In February 1957 Bethel School Township voters approved joining North Posey Schools, and so the township joined the new metropolitan school district on February 25, 1957. It was the final township in Posey County to have not joined a metropolitan school district.

In fall 1957 the district was scheduled to build a unified elementary school 2 miles (3.2 km) from Wadesville, and it proposed a secondary school site 2.5 miles (4.0 km) from Poseyville, and in turn it would convert the previous secondary school into another elementary school.

On January 19, 2012, it was announced that the Consolidated School Town of New Harmony and Harmony Township would be annexed by the MSD of North Posey County effective July 1, 2012.

== Facilities ==
- North Posey High School
- North Posey Junior High School
- North Elementary School (Poseyville)
- South Terrace Elementary School (Blairsville)
  - It is 2 miles (3.2 km) southeast of Wadesville. The district was scheduled to begin building this school in fall 1957. 10 classrooms were planned to be built.
- Southern Indiana Career & Technical Center

== Neighboring districts ==
- Metropolitan School District of Mt. Vernon
- South Gibson School Corporation
- Evansville Vanderburgh School Corporation
