= Bozeman-Waters National Bank =

- U.S. National Register of Historic Places
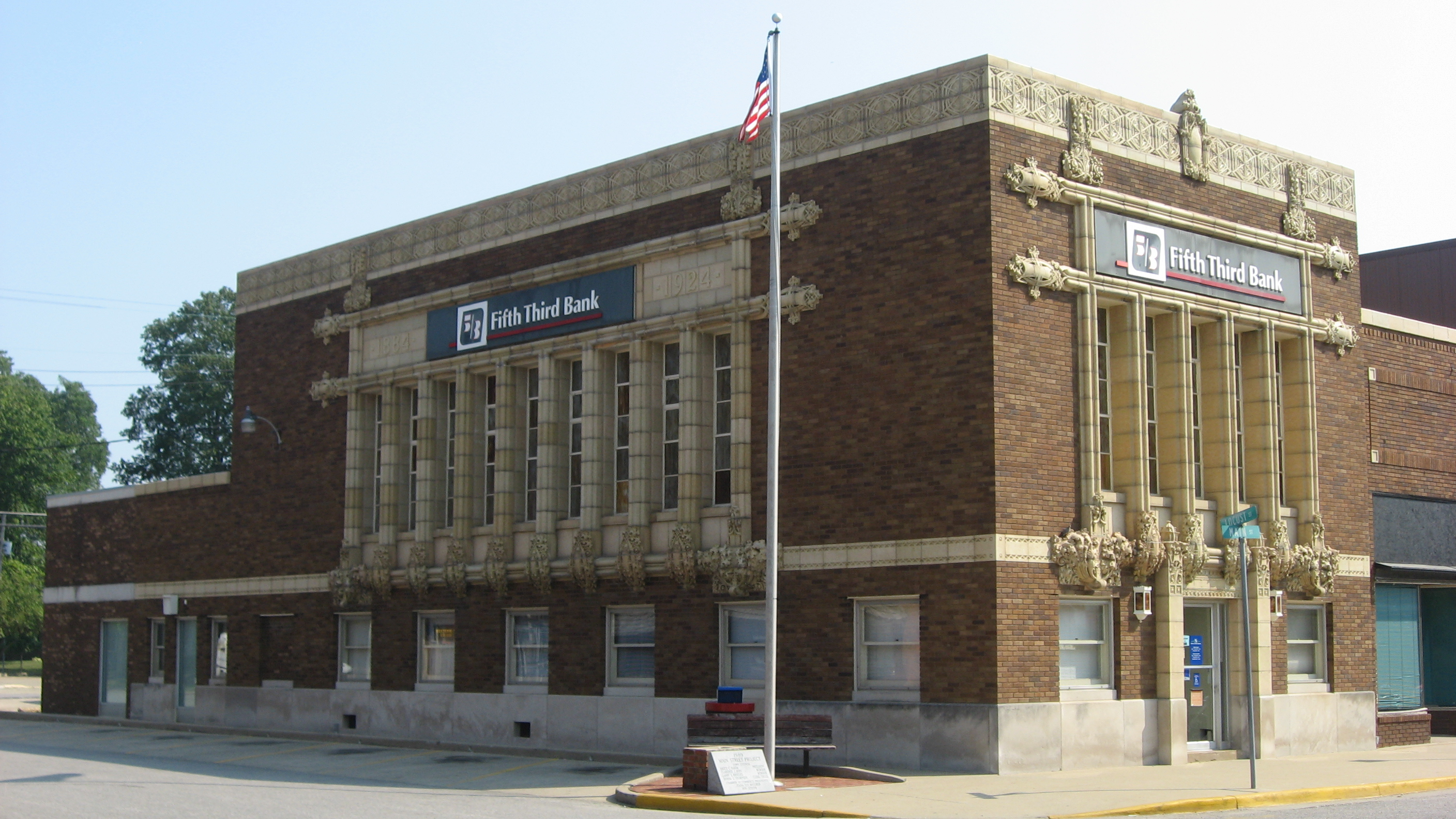
- Bozeman-Waters National Bank, August 2011

- Location within Indiana Location within the United States
- Location: 19 W. Main St., Poseyville, Indiana
- Coordinates: 38°10′12″N 87°47′1″W
- Area: less than one acre
- Built: 1924
- Architect: Thole, Edward J., Sr.; Fowler & Thole
- Architectural style: Late 19th And Early 20th Century American Movements, Sullivanesque
- NRHP reference No.: 87001768
- Added to NRHP: October 1, 1987

Bozeman-Waters National Bank, also known as the Farmers Bank & Trust Company, is a historic bank building located at Poseyville, Indiana. It was built in 1924, and is a 1 1/2-story, brown brick building with Sullivanesque terra cotta ornamentation. It has a one-story rear section. The interior was extensively remodeled in 1957. The building is modeled on the People's Federal Savings and Loan Association in Sidney, Ohio.

It was listed on the National Register of Historic Places in 1987.
