= Center Township, Posey County, Indiana =

Center Township Posey County
- Township
- Coordinates: 38°05′41″N 87°48′30″W
- Country: United States
- State: Indiana
- County: Posey

Government
  - Type: Indiana township

Area
  - Total: 25.17 sq mi (65.18 km^{2})
  - Land: 25.14 sq mi (65.12 km^{2})
  - Water: 0.019 sq mi (0.05 km^{2})
- Elevation: 430 ft (131 m)

Population (2020)
  - Total: 1,479
  - Density: 58.82/sq mi (22.71/km^{2})
- FIPS code: 18-11584
- GNIS feature ID: 453190

Center Township is one of ten townships in Posey County, Indiana. As of the 2020 census, its population was 1,479.

Historical population
Census	Pop.	Note	%±
1890	1,044		—
1900	1,169		12.0%
1910	1,042		−10.9%
1920	877		−15.8%
1930	776		−11.5%
1940	813		4.8%
1950	862		6.0%
1960	843		−2.2%
1970	938		11.3%
1980	1,151		22.7%
1990	1,166		1.3%
2000	1,321		13.3%
2010	1,433		8.5%
2020	1,479		3.2%
Source: US Decennial Census

== History ==
Center Township was established in 1859. The township was so named on account of its location being near the geographical center of Posey County.

== Adjacent townships ==
- Posey County
  - Harmony Township
  - Lynn Township
  - Robb Township
  - Robinson Township
  - Smith Township

== Unincorporated places ==
- Hepburn
- Oliver
- Wadesville
