= Bethel Township, Posey County, Indiana =

Bethel Township Posey County
- Township
- Coordinates: 38°12′19″N 87°55′36″W
- Country: United States
- State: Indiana
- County: Posey

Government
  - Type: Indiana township

Area
  - Total: 19.82 sq mi (51.34 km^{2})
  - Land: 19.08 sq mi (49.42 km^{2})
  - Water: 0.74 sq mi (1.92 km^{2})
- Elevation: 381 ft (116 m)

Population (2020)
  - Total: 245
  - Density: 12.8/sq mi (4.96/km^{2})
- FIPS code: 18-05014
- GNIS feature ID: 453107

Bethel Township is one of ten townships in Posey County, Indiana. As of the 2020 census, its population was 245.

Historical population
| Census | Pop. | Note | %± |
|---|---|---|---|
| 1890 | 768 | | — |
| 1900 | 769 | | 0.1% |
| 1910 | 851 | | 10.7% |
| 1920 | 736 | | −13.5% |
| 1930 | 471 | | −36.0% |
| 1940 | 737 | | 56.5% |
| 1950 | 598 | | −18.9% |
| 1960 | 469 | | −21.6% |
| 1970 | 359 | | −23.5% |
| 1980 | 386 | | 7.5% |
| 1990 | 329 | | −14.8% |
| 2000 | 327 | | −0.6% |
| 2010 | 311 | | −4.9% |
| 2020 | 245 | | −21.2% |
Source: US Decennial Census

== History ==
Bethel Township was organized in 1821. The township was named for P. C. Bethel, a pioneer settler.

== Adjacent Townships ==
- Indiana
  - Posey County
    - Robb Township
  - Gibson County
    - Wabash Township
- Illinois
  - White County
    - Gray Township
    - Phillips Township

== Towns ==
- Griffin

== Unincorporated Places ==
- New Baltimore

== Education ==
It is within the Metropolitan School District of North Posey County, which operates North Posey High School.
