= Wadesville, Indiana =

- Unincorporated area
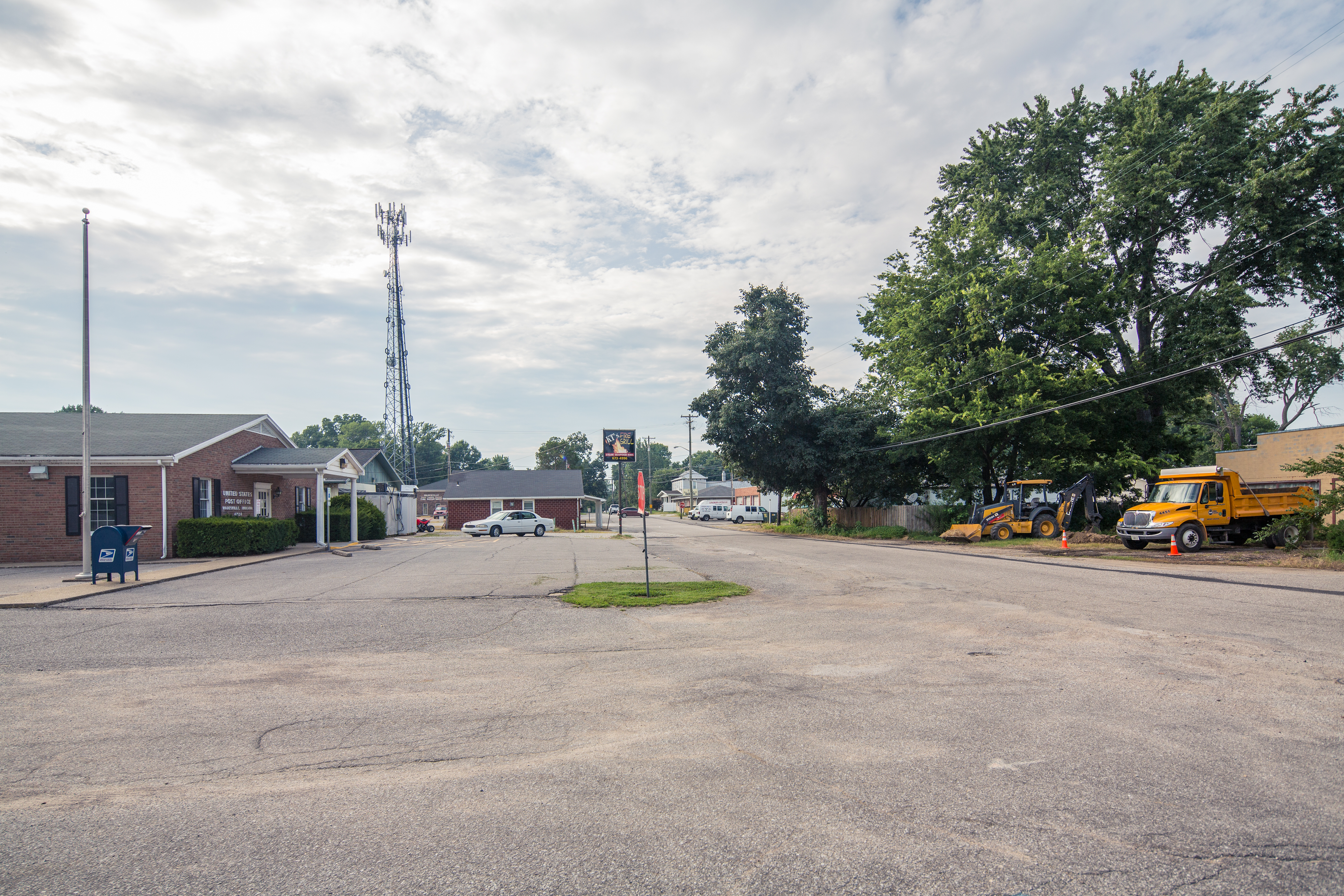

- Location within Indiana Location within the United States
- Coordinates: 38°06′14″N 87°47′25″W
- Country: United States
- State: Indiana
- County: Posey
- Township: Center
- Elevation: 456 ft (139 m)
- Time zone: UTC-6 (Central (CST))
  - Summer (DST): UTC-5 (CDT)
- ZIP code: 47638
- Area codes: 812, 930
- GNIS feature ID: 2830503

Wadesville is an unincorporated area in northern Center Township, Posey County, in the U.S. state of Indiana. It lies along State Road 66 northeast of the city of Mt. Vernon, the county seat of Posey County. Although Wadesville is unincorporated, it has a post office, with the ZIP code of 47638.

As of 2023 the U.S. Census Bureau had established a census-designated place for this settlement.

== History ==
Wadesville was laid out in 1852. The community was named for the Wade family of settlers. A post office has been in operation at Wadesville since 1855.

== Wadesville High School ==
Wadesville had a local high school, the "Wadesville Red Devils." In 1958 Wadesville consolidated with Poseyville, Cynthiana, and Griffin to form North Posey High School. The school's yearbook was called the "Devilree." The school offered grades 1st-12th.

== Red Devil Athletics ==
The school colors of the Red Devils were white and red. Wadesville competed in the Posey County Conference until 1958. In the final season for the Red Devils basketball team they went 11-9 and won the Posey County Conference tournament, defeating Cynthiana 81–59 in the final. The Red Devils also won the Posey County Conference in the 1958 baseball season.

== Education ==
Center Township is within the Metropolitan School District of North Posey County. MSD of North Posey County consists of two elementary schools (North, South Terrace), North Posey Junior High School, and North Posey High School.

South Terrace Elementary School is in Blairsville, 2 miles (3.2 km) southeast of Wadesville. The district was scheduled to begin building this school in fall 1957. 10 classrooms were planned to be built.

== Demographics ==
Historical population
| Census | Pop. | Note | %± |
|---|---|---|---|
| 2023 (est.) | 778 |

The United States Census Bureau delineated Wadesville as a census designated place in the 2022 American Community Survey.

== Highways ==
- Indiana State Road 66
- Indiana State Road 165
