= Lippe, Indiana =

- Unincorporated community
- Location within Indiana Location within the United States
- Coordinates: 38°00′55″N 87°45′14″W
- Country: United States
- State: Indiana
- County: Posey
- Township: Robinson
- Elevation: 440 ft (130 m)
- Time zone: UTC-6 (Central (CST))
  - Summer (DST): UTC-5 (CDT)
- ZIP code: 47638
- Area codes: 812, 930
- GNIS feature ID: 437977

Lippe is an unincorporated community in Robinson Township, Posey County, in the U.S. state of Indiana.

== History ==
A post office was established at Lippe in 1890, and remained in operation until it was discontinued in 1902. The community was named after Lippe, in Germany, the native land of a large share of the early settlers.
