= Posey County, Indiana =

County in Indiana, United States

- County
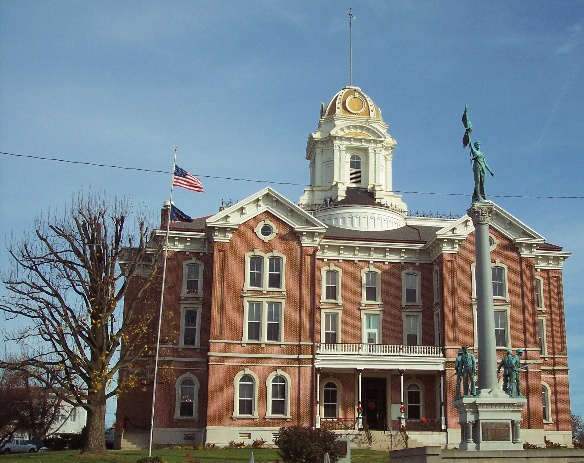
- Posey County Courthouse in Mount Vernon

- Location within the U.S. state of Indiana
- Coordinates: 38°01′N 87°52′W
- Country: United States
- State: Indiana
- Founded: November 11, 1814
- Named for: Thomas Posey
- Seat: Mount Vernon
- Largest city: Mount Vernon

Area
  - Total: 419.32 sq mi (1,086.0 km^{2})
  - Land: 409.57 sq mi (1,060.8 km^{2})
  - Water: 9.75 sq mi (25.3 km^{2})

Population (2020)
  - Total: 25,222
  - Estimate (2025): 24,988 ▼
  - Density: 61.582/sq mi (23.777/km^{2})
- Time zone: UTC−6 (Central)
  - Summer (DST): UTC−5 (CDT)
- Congressional district: 8th
- Website: www.poseycountyin.gov
- Indiana county number 65; Southernmost county in Indiana; Westernmost county in Indiana; Lowest point in Indiana located at county's southwestern tip

Posey County is the southernmost, southwesternmost, and westernmost county in the U.S. state of Indiana. Its southern border is formed by the Ohio River, and its western border by the Wabash River, a tributary to the Ohio. As of 2020, the population was 25,222. The county seat is Mount Vernon. Posey County is part of the Evansville, Indiana metropolitan statistical area. The Ports of Indiana-Mount Vernon, on the Ohio River, is the seventh-largest inland port complex in the nation. Mechanization of dock technology has altered the number of workers at the port, but Posey County is still the seventh-largest internal port in the United States, based on tons of materials handled. Grain from the Midwest is among the products shipped.

== History ==
After the American Revolutionary War, Posey County was originally considered part of the Northwest Territory, organized in 1787 by the new United States. As part of the Indiana Territory, it was organized in November 1814 from Gibson and Warrick counties. It was named for Revolutionary War Gen. Thomas Posey, who was then serving as Governor of the Territory. Mount Vernon was designated as the county seat in 1825. Its port on the Ohio River continues to be integral to the economy of the state and county.

Like other parts of southern Ohio, Indiana and Illinois, Posey County was first settled by people from the Upper South, many of whom arrived via the Ohio River. Farming was the primary development at first. In the mid- to late 19th century, the county received many German immigrants. The river port had rougher areas of vice, and a higher population of single men, as was typical. African Americans were among the men who worked on ships and at the port.

Posey County was the site of the largest recorded lynching of African Americans in Indiana's history. In October 1878, a white mob lynched seven black men in the span of a few days. No one in the mob was prosecuted, and at each court session for the next three years, the prosecutor asked the judge to "set the case over to the next session". A grand jury was called to investigate the mob action, but with an election pending for the prosecuting attorney, no one was ever indicted. Following years of research, Posey County judge Jim Redwine wrote a novel, Judge Lynch! (2008), based on the events. Redwine sometimes lectures on the riot, inviting his audience to imagine how they would have acted and stressing the injustice done to the African Americans who were denied the right to a fair trial.

== Geography ==
The low rolling hills of southwest Indiana are carved by drainages; the Black River flows southwestward through the county's upper portion, discharging into the Wabash River north of New Harmony. Rush Creek drains the county's central portion, flowing westward to discharge into the Wabash in Harmonie State Park. The area is largely cleared and devoted to agriculture or urban use, although the drainages and lowlands are still wooded or brush-filled.

According to the 2010 United States census, the county has a total area of 419.32 square miles (1,086.0 km^{2}), of which 409.57 square miles (1,060.8 km^{2}) (or 97.67%) is land and 9.75 square miles (25.3 km^{2}) (or 2.33%) is water. The lowest point in the state of Indiana is located on the Ohio River in Posey County, where the Wabash River flows into it, and Posey County's highest point (590 feet/180 meters ASL) is a small rise 1.6 miles (2.6 km) SSW from Saint Wendel, near the county's southeast corner. Posey county lies at the tripoint of Indiana, Kentucky and Illinois. Additionally the distance between the mouth of the Wabash River and the northeast corner of Steuben County is the longest straightline distance in Indiana at 321 miles (517 km)

=== Adjacent counties ===
- White County, Illinois (west and northwest across intermittent sections of water and land boundaries)
- Gallatin County, Illinois (southwest also over intermittent sections of water and land boundaries)
- Gibson County (north and northeast)
- Union County, Kentucky (south)
- Vanderburgh County (east)
- Henderson County, Kentucky (southeast also with some land boundaries on Indiana side)

=== Cities and towns ===
- Cynthiana – town
- Griffin – town
- Mount Vernon – city/county seat
- New Harmony – town
- Poseyville – town

=== Townships ===
- Bethel
- Black
- Center
- Harmony
- Lynn
- Marrs
- Point
- Robb
- Robinson
- Smith

=== Unincorporated places ===
- Blairsville
- Caborn
- Dead Mans Crossing
- Erwin
- Farmersville
- Grafton
- Hepburn
- Heusler
- Hovey
- Lippe
- Marrs Center
- New Baltimore
- Oak Grove
- Oliver
- Parkers Settlement – census-designated place
- Rapture
- Saint Philip
- Saint Wendel
- Savah
- Solitude
- Springfield
- Stewartsville
- Upton
- Wadesville
- Welborn Switch
- West Franklin

=== Protected areas ===
- Harmonie State Park
- Wabash Lowlands Wetland Conservation Area

== Transportation ==
=== Major highways ===
- I-64
- SR 62
- SR 65
- SR 66
- SR 68
- SR 69
- SR 165
- SR 269

=== Railroads ===
- CSX Transportation
- Evansville Western Railway

=== River ports ===
- Ports of Indiana-Mt. Vernon is "the 7th largest inland port [complex] in the United States and serves as a major multi-modal hub for the region." It handles more than 4 million trip tons of cargo annually. Southwind Maritime Center is the name of a related port facility, now considered within the complex. This port facility is important to the economy of the state of Indiana as well as to Posey County. It handles shipping of grain, grain products, coal, fertilizer, cement and minerals, from a region that produces a large amount of grain. This is the largest public port within 175 miles of the confluence of the Ohio and Mississippi rivers.

== Climate and weather ==
Mount Vernon, Indiana

Climate chart (precipitation, max. and min. temperature)
J	F	M	A	M	J	J	A	S	O	N	D
3.4 38 23	3.2 44 26	4.6 54 35	4.4 65 45	5.4 75 55	4 84 64	4.1 87 68	3 86 65	2.7 80 58	2.9 69 46	4.4 55 37	3.7 43 27
- █ Average max. and min. temperatures in °F
- █ Precipitation totals in inches
- Source: The Weather Channel
Metric conversion
J	F	M	A	M	J	J	A	S	O	N	D
86 3 −5	80 7 −3	116 12 2	111 18 7	137 24 13	103 29 18	104 31 20	77 30 18	67 27 14	74 21 8	110 13 3	94 6 −3
- █ Average max. and min. temperatures in °C
- █ Precipitation totals in mm

In recent years, average temperatures in Mount Vernon have ranged from a nighttime low of 23 °F (−5 °C) in January to a daytime high of 87 °F (31 °C) in July, although a record low of −21 °F (−29 °C) was recorded in January 1912 and a record high of 109 °F (43 °C) was recorded in July 1901. Average monthly precipitation ranged from 2.65 inches (67 mm) in September to 5.38 inches (137 mm) in May.

Like many other locations in the Midwestern United States and Upland South, Tornadoes have been known to occasionally strike Posey County. On March 18, 1925, the 1925 Tri-State Tornado hit the town of Griffin in the northernmost part of the county, killing 25 people and injuring hundreds. Also, on April 2, 2024, an EF-2 Tornado passed through parts of the county, including Harmonie State Park, Blairsville, and St. Wendel.

== Government ==
The county government is a constitutional body, and is granted specific powers by the Constitution of Indiana, and by the Indiana Code.

County Council: The legislative branch of the county government; controls spending and revenue collection in the county. Representatives are elected to four-year terms from single-member districts of roughly equal population in the county. They set salaries, the annual budget, and special spending. The council has limited authority to impose local taxes, in the form of an income and property tax that is subject to state level approval, excise taxes, and service taxes.

Board of Commissioners: The executive body of the county is a three-person board of commissioners, who are elected at-large (county-wide), to staggered four-year terms. One commissioner serves as president. The commissioners execute acts legislated by the council, collect revenue, and manage the county government.

Court: The county maintains a small claims court that handles civil cases. The court judge is elected to a four-year term and must be a member of the Indiana Bar Association. The judge is assisted by a constable, who is also elected to a four-year term. In some cases, court decisions can be appealed to the state level circuit court.

County Officials: Other county elected offices include sheriff, coroner, auditor, treasurer, recorder, surveyor, and circuit court clerk. Each serves a four-year term. Members elected to county government positions are required to declare party affiliations and to be residents of the county.

== Politics ==
Posey County was a Democratic stronghold turned swing county during the 20th Century. Since the turn of the 21st Century, the county has swung heavily into the Republican column, with Donald Trump gaining over 70% of the vote in 2024. The last Democrat to obtain a full majority in the county was Jimmy Carter in 1976, although Bill Clinton narrowly carried the county by plurality in 1992 and 1996, largely due to a heavy third-party presence in both elections.

United States presidential election results for Posey County, Indiana
Year	Republican		Democratic		Third party(ies)	
Year	No.	%	No.	%	No.	%
1888	2,369	45.70%	2,684	51.77%	131	2.53%
1892	2,077	39.99%	2,660	51.21%	457	8.80%
1896	2,526	44.50%	3,103	54.66%	48	0.85%
1900	2,553	43.57%	3,177	54.22%	129	2.20%
1904	2,419	44.32%	2,825	51.76%	214	3.92%
1908	2,444	42.49%	3,084	53.62%	224	3.89%
1912	1,193	23.95%	2,767	55.55%	1,021	20.50%
1916	2,291	42.97%	2,922	54.80%	119	2.23%
1920	4,802	49.72%	4,695	48.61%	161	1.67%
1924	4,173	48.82%	4,115	48.14%	260	3.04%
1928	4,396	51.80%	4,052	47.74%	39	0.46%
1932	2,876	33.27%	5,641	65.26%	127	1.47%
1936	3,088	34.74%	5,630	63.34%	170	1.91%
1940	4,514	47.06%	5,022	52.35%	57	0.59%
1944	4,374	50.75%	4,183	48.53%	62	0.72%
1948	3,879	44.43%	4,729	54.16%	123	1.41%
1952	5,293	57.61%	3,835	41.74%	59	0.64%
1956	5,780	59.44%	3,919	40.30%	25	0.26%
1960	5,369	54.47%	4,457	45.22%	31	0.31%
1964	3,573	36.57%	6,164	63.09%	33	0.34%
1968	5,045	49.70%	3,889	38.32%	1,216	11.98%
1972	6,771	65.24%	3,586	34.55%	21	0.20%
1976	5,136	48.97%	5,298	50.51%	54	0.51%
1980	6,096	53.69%	4,465	39.33%	793	6.98%
1984	6,472	59.07%	4,452	40.63%	33	0.30%
1988	5,987	57.07%	4,468	42.59%	35	0.33%
1992	4,435	38.72%	4,632	40.44%	2,386	20.83%
1996	4,638	42.34%	4,965	45.33%	1,350	12.33%
2000	6,498	58.49%	4,430	39.87%	182	1.64%
2004	7,833	65.35%	4,085	34.08%	68	0.57%
2008	6,804	53.28%	5,828	45.63%	139	1.09%
2012	7,430	60.77%	4,533	37.08%	263	2.15%
2016	8,404	66.74%	3,521	27.96%	667	5.30%
2020	9,209	69.38%	3,817	28.76%	247	1.86%
2024	9,206	70.93%	3,572	27.52%	201	1.55%

== Demographics ==
Historical population
Census	Pop.	Note	%±
1820	4,061		—
1830	6,549		61.3%
1840	9,683		47.9%
1850	12,549		29.6%
1860	16,167		28.8%
1870	19,185		18.7%
1880	20,857		8.7%
1890	21,529		3.2%
1900	22,333		3.7%
1910	21,670		−3.0%
1920	19,334		−10.8%
1930	17,853		−7.7%
1940	19,183		7.4%
1950	19,818		3.3%
1960	19,214		−3.0%
1970	21,740		13.1%
1980	26,414		21.5%
1990	25,968		−1.7%
2000	27,061		4.2%
2010	25,910		−4.3%
2020	25,222		−2.7%
2025 (est.)	24,988	▼	−0.9%
US Decennial Census; 1790-1960 1900-1990; 1990-2000 2010

=== Racial and ethnic composition ===
Posey County, Indiana – Racial and ethnic composition Note: the US Census treats Hispanic/Latino as an ethnic category. This table excludes Latinos from the racial categories and assigns them to a separate category. Hispanics/Latinos may be of any race.
Race / Ethnicity (NH = Non-Hispanic)	Pop 1980	Pop 1990	Pop 2000	Pop 2010	Pop 2020	% 1980	% 1990	% 2000	% 2010	% 2020
White alone (NH)	25,892	25,506	26,443	25,046	23,640	98.02%	98.22%	97.72%	96.67%	93.73%
Black or African American alone (NH)	302	283	231	230	211	1.14%	1.09%	0.85%	0.89%	0.84%
Native American or Alaska Native alone (NH)	36	37	66	42	44	0.14%	0.14%	0.24%	0.16%	0.17%
Asian alone (NH)	44	34	42	70	107	0.17%	0.13%	0.16%	0.27%	0.42%
Native Hawaiian or Pacific Islander alone (NH)	x	x	1	4	3	x	x	0.00%	0.02%	0.01%
Other race alone (NH)	25	4	13	17	57	0.09%	0.02%	0.05%	0.07%	0.23%
Mixed race or Multiracial (NH)	x	x	147	253	785	x	x	0.54%	0.98%	3.11%
Hispanic or Latino (any race)	115	104	118	248	375	0.44%	0.40%	0.44%	0.96%	1.49%
Total	26,414	25,968	27,061	25,910	25,222	100.00%	100.00%	100.00%	100.00%	100.00%

=== 2020 census ===
As of the 2020 census, the county had a population of 25,222. The median age was 42.9 years. 22.9% of residents were under the age of 18 and 19.4% of residents were 65 years of age or older. For every 100 females there were 99.3 males, and for every 100 females age 18 and over there were 97.7 males age 18 and over.

The racial makeup of the county was 94.3% White, 0.8% Black or African American, 0.2% American Indian and Alaska Native, 0.4% Asian, <0.1% Native Hawaiian and Pacific Islander, 0.6% from some other race, and 3.7% from two or more races. Hispanic or Latino residents of any race comprised 1.5% of the population.

29.6% of residents lived in urban areas, while 70.4% lived in rural areas.

There were 10,133 households in the county, of which 29.8% had children under the age of 18 living in them. Of all households, 57.4% were married-couple households, 16.7% were households with a male householder and no spouse or partner present, and 20.6% were households with a female householder and no spouse or partner present. About 25.3% of all households were made up of individuals and 12.0% had someone living alone who was 65 years of age or older.

There were 11,021 housing units, of which 8.1% were vacant. Among occupied housing units, 81.8% were owner-occupied and 18.2% were renter-occupied. The homeowner vacancy rate was 1.0% and the rental vacancy rate was 10.5%.

=== 2010 census ===
As of the 2010 United States census, there were 25,910 people, 10,171 households, and 7,442 families in the county. The population density was 63.3 inhabitants per square mile (24.4/km^{2}). There were 11,207 housing units at an average density of 27.4 per square mile (10.6/km^{2}). The racial makeup of the county was 97.2% white, 0.9% black or African American, 0.3% Asian, 0.2% American Indian, 0.4% from other races, and 1.1% from two or more races. Those of Hispanic or Latino origin made up 1.0% of the population. In terms of ancestry, 43.6% were German, 13.6% were American, 11.6% were Irish, and 11.2% were English.

Of the 10,171 households, 32.7% had children under the age of 18 living with them, 60.4% were married couples living together, 8.5% had a female householder with no husband present, 26.8% were non-families, and 23.3% of all households were made up of individuals. The average household size was 2.52 and the average family size was 2.97. The median age was 41.6 years.

The median income for a household in the county was $47,697 and the median income for a family was $68,722. Males had a median income of $55,786 versus $32,747 for females. The per capita income for the county was $26,727. About 6.0% of families and 8.3% of the population were below the poverty line, including 12.2% of those under age 18 and 8.3% of those age 65 or over.

== Education ==
The county has two school districts: Mount Vernon Metropolitan School District and North Posey County Schools Metropolitan School District.

Public high schools

- Mount Vernon High School – Mount Vernon
- North Posey High School – Poseyville address

Previously New Harmony Town and Township Consolidated Schools covered a portion of the county. The district closed in 2012 and consolidated into North Posey County Schools.

== Tourism and recreation ==
- Posey County Stockyard
- Visit Posey County
- Brittlebank Park – Mount Vernon
- Harmonie State Park – New Harmony
- Hovey Lake State Fish & Wildlife Area – Mount Vernon
- New Harmony Historic District – New Harmony
- Sherburne Park – Mount Vernon

== Representation in other media ==
- Posey County Judge James M. Redwine wrote a novel, Judge Lynch! (2008), based on the 1878 lynchings of seven African-American men in Mt. Vernon.

== See also ==
- Erie Canal Soda Pop Festival – Griffin, Indiana.
- National Register of Historic Places listings in Posey County, Indiana
