= Saint Wendel, Indiana =

- Unincorporated community
- Location within Indiana Location within the United States
- Coordinates: 38°06′20″N 87°41′50″W
- Country: United States
- State: Indiana
- County: Vanderburgh and Posey
- Township: Armstrong and Robinson
- Founder: Wendel Wassmer
- Named for: Founder
- Elevation: 564 ft (172 m)
- Time zone: UTC-6 (Central (CST))
  - Summer (DST): UTC-5 (CDT)
- Area codes: 812, 930
- GNIS feature ID: 442864

Saint Wendel is an unincorporated community located on the Vanderburgh-Posey county line in the U.S. state of Indiana. It occupies small portions of two townships-- Armstrong and Robinson. The community is named for St. Wendel Parish, which in turn is named after Wendelin of Trier, patron saint of Wendel Wassmer, who originally owned the grounds used for this Catholic church building.

As of 2023 the U.S. Census Bureau had established a census-designated place for this settlement.

== History ==
The settlement was founded by Marcus and Wendel Wassmer. The Wassmer brothers were German-Canadian coopers who had immigrated from Baden to Toronto. Legend has it that in the spring of 1837, they walked south to this vicinity. Upon their return to Toronto in the summer, they found they no longer had jobs and returned on foot once again to the same grounds they had visited that spring. Their second arrival is said to have happened in the fall of 1837. The Wassmers secured some farmland, and their descendants still live there today.

Prior to December, 1841, Mass had been celebrated in St. Wendel parish from the time of its creation in the home of Martin Kohl, but in Christmas week of the year mentioned, the congregation—composed of twenty families—prepared the material and erected within five days a log structure as a house of worship named in honor of Wendel Wassmer's patron saint, Wendelin of Trier.

In 1881, Wendel Station was built at mile 233 on the Evansville and Peoria Railroad at St. Wendel Road, approximately two miles (3.2 km) north of the church. By 1882, St. Wendel's population was 175 individuals.

A post office was established at Saint Wendel in 1852, and remained in operation until it was discontinued in 1907.

== Demographics ==
Historical population
Census	Pop.	Note	%±
2023 (est.)	1,120

The United States Census Bureau defined Saint Wendel as a census designated place in the 2022 American Community Survey.
