= New Baltimore, Indiana =

- Unincorporated community
- Location within Indiana Location within the United States
- Coordinates: 38°10′38″N 87°53′03″W
- Country: United States
- State: Indiana
- County: Posey
- Township: Bethel
- Elevation: 367 ft (112 m)
- Time zone: UTC-6 (Central (CST))
  - Summer (DST): UTC-5 (CDT)
- ZIP code: 47616
- Area codes: 812, 930
- GNIS feature ID: 449048

New Baltimore is an unincorporated community in Bethel Township, Posey County, in the U.S. state of Indiana.

== History ==
New Baltimore was laid out in 1837 and was once an important shipping point for river traffic. With the advent of other modes of transportation, business activity shifted to other nearby places, and the town's population dwindled.
