= New Harmony Town and Township Consolidated Schools =

New Harmony Town and Township Consolidated Schools was a school district headquartered in New Harmony, Indiana. It operated one school, New Harmony School, with grades Kindergarten through 12.

The district, in Posey County, included New Harmony, as well as Harmony Township.

== History ==
The school in New Harmony opened in 1877. The school was created as part of a means of establishing a utopia. One principle in the utopia was that male and female students should receive the same education.

A school building opened in 1913. In 1945 an addition opened, and two more were placed in 1952 and 1954. The addition planned in 1952 had second floor restrooms and two classrooms built.

In the 1960s, various Indiana school districts merged into one another. The residents of New Harmony decided not to consolidate and opposed such efforts. In 1987, only 24 other school districts in the state had not merged or been acquired by another. The school was accredited by the North Central Association of Colleges and Schools until the 1960s, but it remained accredited by the State of Indiana as of 1987.

The final school facility opened in 1987. The facility had a cost of $3,100,000. Historic New Harmony Inc. gave the land to the school district, Gove Associates designed the building, and Industrial Contractors and Peyronnin Construction constructed the facility. The new school building resulted in tax increases. People in the area donated items to decorate and supply the school. The district had plans to sell and/or give away its previous facilities.

In 1987, the student count was 250, with 98 of those students in high school, and the teacher count was 21. This resulted in class sizes which would give each and all grade levels class sizes under "Primetime," a state of Indiana initiative to lower class sizes that only applied to grades Kindergarten through 3. There were 23 students in the graduating class of the 1987-1988 school year. Of the 305 school districts in Indiana, New Harmony ranked 300 in terms of student count.

By 2012 the State of Indiana changed how it sent money to individual schools and allotted the money by the number of students present. By January 2012, this resulted in the state sending 30% less funding. Additionally, it had decreasing numbers of students as there were fewer children in New Harmony. There were 137 students total circa December 2011 and an anticipated enrollment count of about 107 for the 2012–2013 school year. Fran Thoele was the final superintendent of the school district.

In December 2011, the board of education chose to close the K-12 school, and to merge into the Metropolitan School District of North Posey County; the board of education of that district agreed to absorb New Harmony. North Posey High School absorbed the high school students.

The council for the town of New Harmony paid $10 and acquired the school building. In 2019, an individual acquired the school building from the town council for $125,000 and stated a desire to preserve its historical character.

== Campuses ==
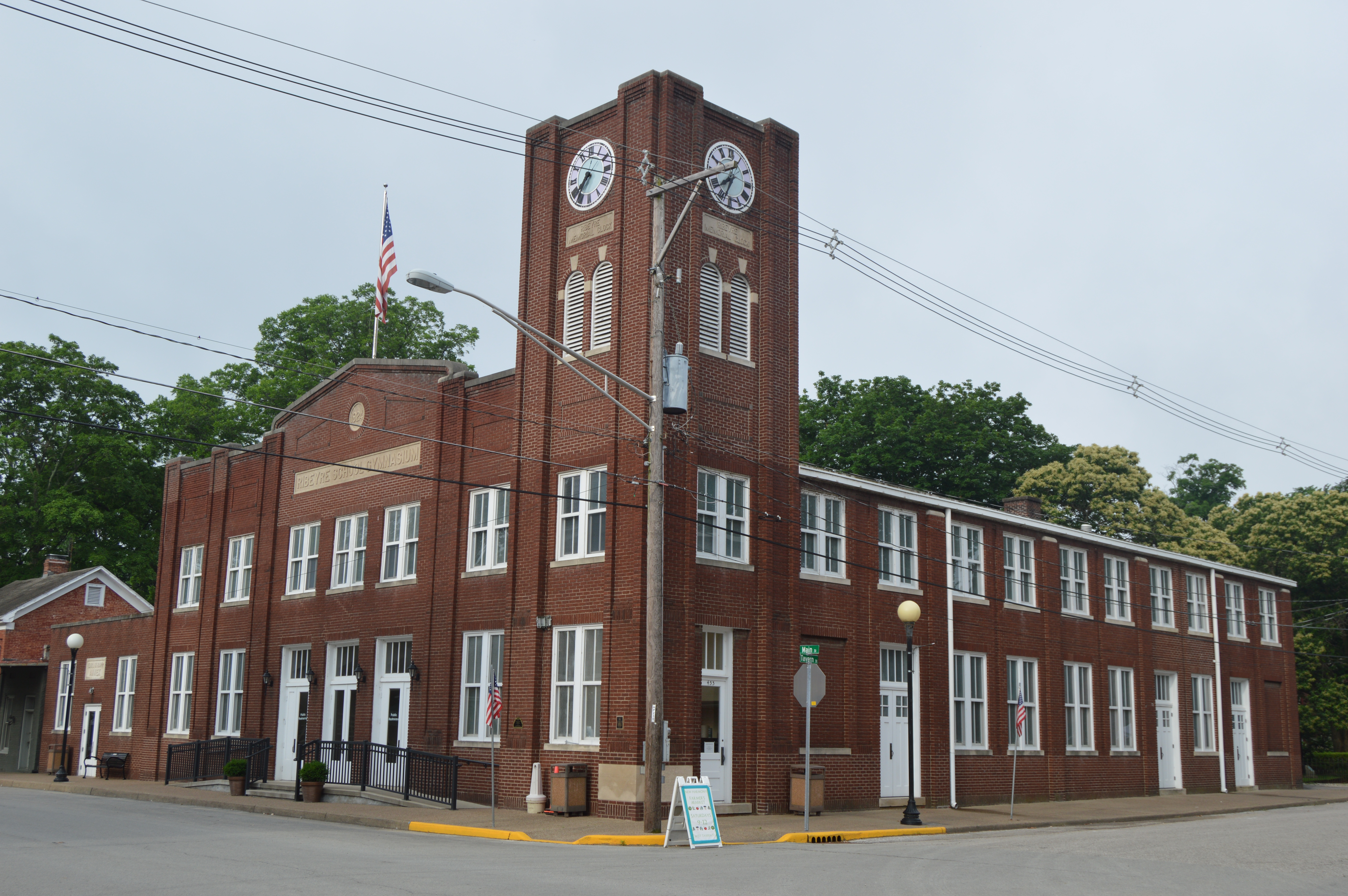
Ribeyre School Gymnasium, which served as a gymnasium in the pre-1987 school

The 1987 campus had 55,000 square feet (5,100 m^{2}) of space on 25 acres (10 ha) of property, with 22 classrooms and a 1,000-person gymnasium. In 1987 the facility did not have a dedicated auditorium, but one could be improvised as the music room and cafeteria had a corridor between them. The gymnasium had the dimensions 80 feet (24 m) by 50 feet (15 m).

A pre-1987 gymnasium was the Ribeyre Gymnasium, which opened in 1924. By 2024 the facility had a renovation worth $1,000,000, and became a part of the Ribeyre Center, used for special events.

== Athletics ==
The sports mascot was the Rappites.

== Curriculum ==
In 1987 the school had Spanish as a foreign language classes. There were plans to have classes related to one other language by circa 1989.
