= Oliver, Indiana =

- Unincorporated community
- Location within Indiana Location within the United States
- Coordinates: 38°02′36″N 87°50′21″W
- Country: United States
- State: Indiana
- County: Posey
- Township: Center
- Elevation: 417 ft (127 m)
- Time zone: UTC-6 (Central (CST))
  - Summer (DST): UTC-5 (CDT)
- ZIP code: 47616
- Area codes: 812, 930
- GNIS feature ID: 440652

Oliver is an unincorporated community in Center Township, Posey County, in the U.S. state of Indiana.

== History ==
A post office was established at Oliver in 1883, and remained in operation until 1934. Several members of the Oliver family served as early postmasters.
