= Erie Canal Soda Pop Festival =

American music festival in 1972

Coordinates: 38.1657401°N 87.9227042°W

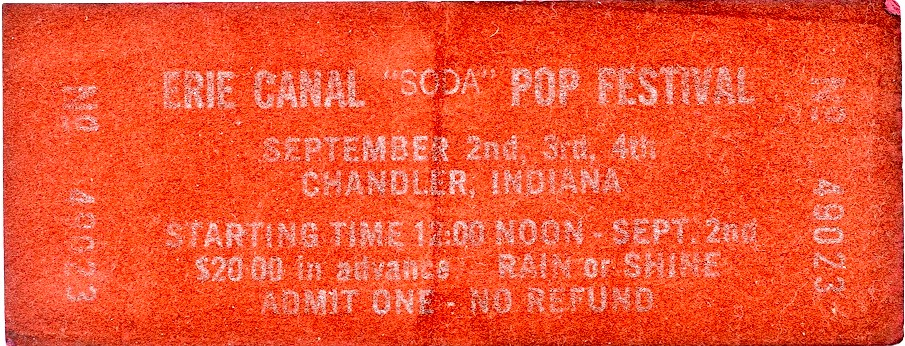
- Genre: Rock, pop
- Dates: Labor Day weekend (September 2–4), 1972
- Locations: Bull Island, White County, Illinois
- Years active: 1972
- Founders: Tom Duncan and Bob Alexander
- Attendance: est. 300,000
- Capacity: 55,000

The Erie Canal "Soda" Pop Festival, also known colloquially as the Bull Island Rock Festival, was a rock festival held on September 2–4, 1972, on Bull Island, a strip of land in Illinois but on the Indiana side of the Wabash River near Griffin. A crowd of an estimated 200,000 to 300,000 people attended the concert, four times what the promoters had estimated. Food and water were in short supply, and the gathering descended into relative chaos amidst heavy rains and a lack of security. Many of the scheduled acts canceled their performances due to safety concerns. After the festival concluded, the remnants of the crowd rioted and burned the main stage.

== History ==
=== Planning ===
On July 2, 1972, promoters Tom Duncan and Bob Alexander held a successful small rock festival, the Freedom Festival and Ice Cream Social, at Bosse Field in Evansville, Indiana, featuring artists such as Ike and Tina Turner, Dr. John, Howlin' Wolf, New Riders of the Purple Sage, and Edgar Winter. Based on that success, Duncan and Alexander then began planning a “bigger-than-Woodstock” festival nearby.

The Erie Canal "Soda" Pop Festival was originally slated to be held in Chandler, Indiana. However, various court battles and restraining orders issued by local governments wary of large crowds prevented the festival from being held anywhere in the state. Shortly before the festival was scheduled to begin on the Labor Day weekend of 1972, the promoters decided on a site near Griffin, Indiana, known as "Bull Island". Due to the course of the Wabash River changing since the border with neighboring Illinois was drawn, Bull Island is located in Illinois but on the Indiana side of the river. The government of White County, Illinois, where Bull Island is located, was unable to prevent the festival from being held in the short time they had after learning of the promoters' plans.

=== The concert ===
Duncan and Alexander initially estimated that 55,000 people would attend the festival; as the weekend of the concert approached, it became obvious that a much larger crowd was coming. As Bull Island was accessible by only two roads, several roads on the way to the site, including Interstate 64, were backed up for over 20 miles (32 km). Numerous attendees caught in traffic sold drugs to each other while waiting to continue moving. The only security personnel on the festival grounds were three White County deputy sheriffs.

The scheduled festival lineup included Black Sabbath, Joe Cocker, the Allman Brothers Band, John Mayall, Cheech & Chong, Canned Heat, Fleetwood Mac, Santana, Ballin' Jack, Amboy Dukes, Bob Seger, Bang, Ravi Shankar, Albert King, the Doors, Brownsville Station, Mike Quatro Jam Band, Gentle Giant, Black Oak Arkansas, the Eagles, the Chambers Brothers, Boones Farm, Slade, Birtha, Nazareth, Rory Gallagher Band, Rod Stewart and the Faces, Ramatam, Flash, Danny O'Keefe, Captain Beyond, Patto, Foghat, The Doobie Brothers, REO Speedwagon, Pure Prairie League, Flo & Eddie, Lee Michaels, Flash Cadillac and the Continental Kids, Eric Quincy Tate, and Delbert & Glenn. However, most scheduled performers cancelled their appearances during the festival due to difficulty reaching the site and concerns about safety in light of the lack of security, open availability of illegal substances, unsanitary conditions, and flooding. The extensive cancellations produced long gaps between the sets that were performed, which angered the audience.

=== Difficulties and aftermath ===
Over the three days, the festival drifted steadily into chaos. Heavy rains soaked the poorly-protected stage beginning on the Friday night before the festival began. Food and water were scarce; when some vendors overcharged for food and drinks due to low supply, the crowd robbed many of them and destroyed their facilities. A truck bringing food into the festival was hijacked, looted, and burned. On Sunday evening, some attendees killed a local resident's cow for food, but they did not have any means of butchering it.

Drugs were freely available in a makeshift market area on the festival grounds where dealers openly displayed their illegal goods. Two attendees died during the festival: one from a heroin overdose and the other from drowning in the Wabash River. As the festival ended, the crowd set fire to what remained of the stage and looted parked vehicles.

Cheech & Chong made several jokes about the poor conditions at the festival during their set before it was cut short by a downpour.

The "Soda" Pop Festival lost an estimated $200,000, according to co-promoter Bob Alexander. The promoters were subsequently sued by the landowner of Bull Island, onsite vendors, the Internal Revenue Service, the state governments of Illinois and Indiana, and a local farmer who alleged “cattle lost due to marijuana inhalation”; legal proceedings continued for nine years after the festival.

== See also ==
- List of jam band music festivals
