= 1878 lynchings in Posey County, Indiana =

Posey County, Indiana is located in the southwestern corner of the state, wedged between the Wabash River and Illinois to the west and the Ohio River and Kentucky to the south.

On October 11, 1878, Jim Good, Jeff Hopkins, Ed Warner, William Chambers, and Dan Harris Sr. were lynched in Posey County, Indiana, near the town of Mount Vernon. These men, who were allegedly connected to the robbery of a brothel, were killed by a white mob who broke into the jail where they were being held. Two other men, Dan Harris Jr. and John Harris, were also lynched in the days leading up to October 11, in connection with the same alleged offense. This racial terror lynching is the largest reported lynching in Indiana's history.

== Background of the lynching ==
On October 7, 1878, Mount Vernon newspapers reported that a group of Black men had robbed a group of white women working as sex workers at a brothel near Mount Vernon, Indiana in Posey County. Law enforcement officers listed Jim Good, Jeff Hopkins, Ed Warner, William Chambers, John Harris, and Dan Harris Jr. as suspects, and began to search for them.

Officers arrested Good, Hopkins, Warner, and Chambers, and brought them to jail to await trial. White mobs lynched two men, Dan Harris Jr. and John Harris, before officers could locate them. Officers were unaware of this when they went to the Mount Vernon home of Harris Jr.'s father, Dan Harris Sr. When they arrived, intending to arrest Dan Harris Jr., Harris Sr. informed them that his son had already been lynched the day before. The officers accused Harris Sr. of harboring his son within the home. When officers attempted to forcefully enter, Harris Sr. shot Deputy Sheriff Cyrus Thomas with a shotgun. The city marshal shot back, wounding Harris Sr. before taking him into custody at the same jail as Good, Hopkins, Warner, and Chambers. Deputy Sheriff Thomas died at the scene.

As news of the arrests spread, a mob gathered at the jail where the five men were being held. Even as the crowd grew more violent, officers refused to let them in the jail. Rumors later spread that the Governor had called in the militia, causing 200 armed white men to gather at the nearby train station and prevent the militiamen from departing their train cars once they arrived, even hauling a cannon from the courthouse lawn to the train depot. However, the militia never showed up, and by 2 p.m. on October 11, the crowd at the depot and the jail had dispersed.

== Lynching ==
The mob reconvened at 8 p.m. and 100 or so masked men made their way towards the jail under the cover of darkness. The mob proceeded to raid the jail, overpowering the officers guarding it. After 45 minutes, using crowbars, chisels, and a sledgehammer, the mob broke through the iron door to the cell inside, where four of the men—Good, Hopkins, Warner, and Chambers—were being held. During this time, Harris Sr., who was in a separate cell and in poor condition due to his untreated gunshot wounds from earlier that day, was dismembered by the mob, with body parts being taken as souvenirs.

After killing Harris Sr., the mob forced the other four men out of the jail with their hands bound and ropes around their necks. The men tried to claim their innocence and explain their whereabouts on the night of October 7, but to no avail. Good, Hopkins, Warner, and Chambers were hanged from a large tree outside the jail on the nearby courthouse lawn. The bodies remained hanging for most of the following day, with thousands of people from nearby counties traveling to view them.

== Reactions ==
Events like this lynching in Mount Vernon allowed white southerners to revel in the racist violence that took place in the Midwest. Following the lynching, a Georgia newspaper, The Augusta Chronicle commented that "It will not do for the North any longer to hold up its hands in horror over the disposition of the South to indulge in lynch law."

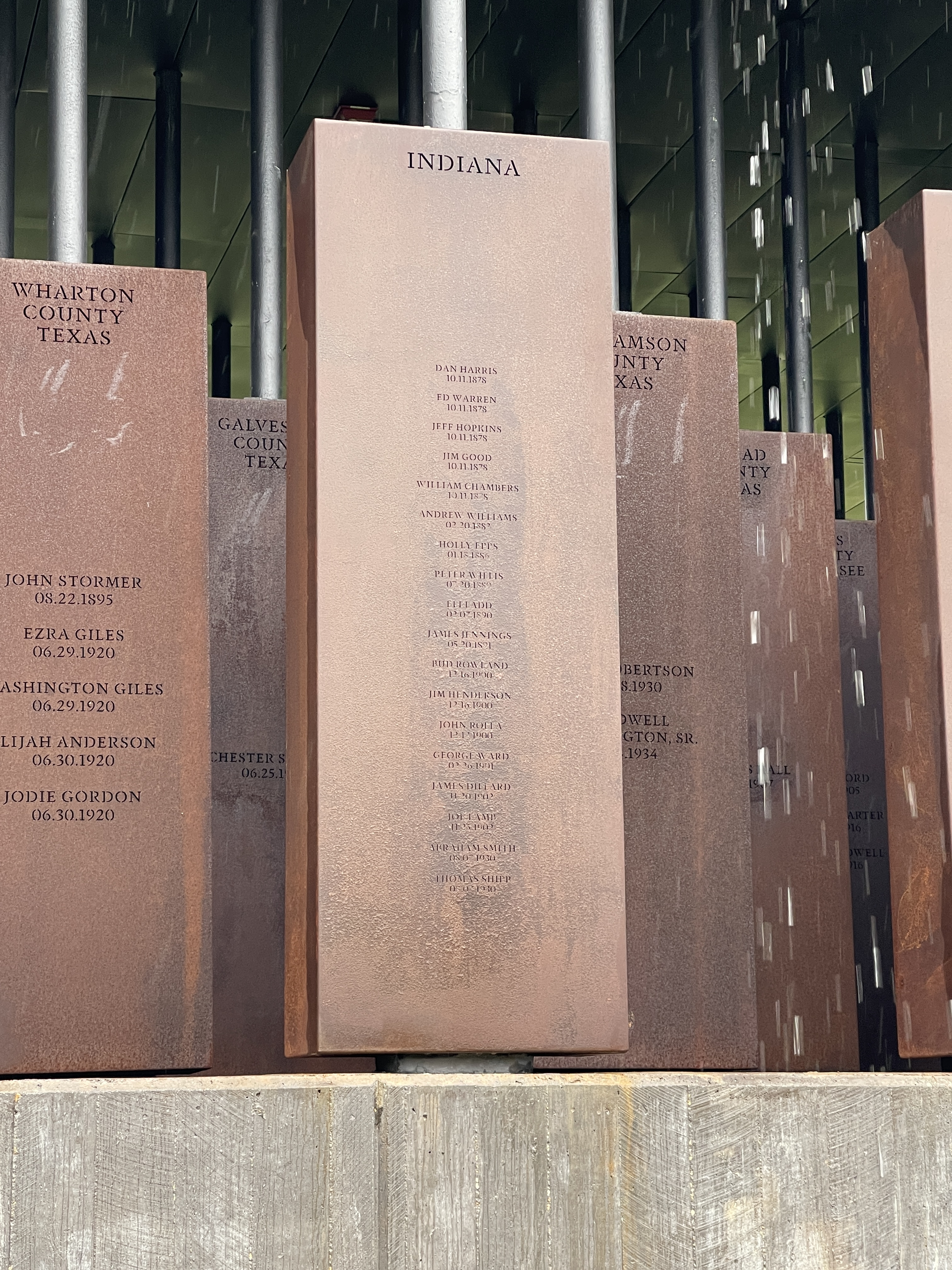
Equal Justice Initiative Marker naming racial terror lynching victims and the date of their deaths from Indiana

== Memorialization ==
The Equal Justice Initiative reports that 18 people were victims of racial terror lynching in Indiana. Ed Warren, Jeff Hopkins, Jim Good, William Chambers, and Dan Harris Sr. are memorialized at the Equal Justice Initiative's National Memorial for Peace and Justice on the Indiana marker. In October 2022, Posey County dedicated a historical marker and a granite bench outside of the Posey County Courthouse.
