= Stewartville =

Stewartville may refer to any of the following communities:

- Stewartville, California, United States
- Stewartville, Guyana
- Stewartville, Minnesota, United States

== See also ==
- Stewartsville (disambiguation)
