= Indiana State Road 165 =

State highway in Gibson and Posey Counties of Indiana

State Road 165
- SR 165 highlighted in red

Route information
- Maintained by INDOT
- Length: 17.172 mi (27.636 km)

Major junctions
- South end: SR 66 at Wadesville
- I-64 at Poseyville
- North end: SR 65 at Owensville

Location
- Country: United States
- State: Indiana
- Counties: Gibson, Posey

Highway system
- Indiana State Highway System; Interstate; US; State; Scenic
← SR 164	→ SR 166

State Road 165 is a 17-mile (27 km) route in Gibson and Posey counties in the U.S. state of Indiana.

== Route description ==
State Road 165 starts at State Road 66 near Wadesville then goes north through Poseyville where it intersects Interstate 64 at Exit 12. It is also concurrent with State Road 68 for about a mile in Poseyville. It then continues north before going east, ending at its parent route, State Road 65, at the Owensville town square.

Like many State Highways in the area SR 165 often sees heavy coal truck traffic as it also provides a shortcut between the mines around Owensville and Princeton and the Port of Indiana in Mount Vernon.

== Major intersections ==
County	Location	mi	km	Destinations	Notes
Posey	Wadesville	0.000	0.000	SR 66 – Wadesville, Evansville, New Harmony	Southern terminus of SR 165
Posey	Poseyville	3.866	6.222	SR 68 west – New Harmony	Southern end of SR 68 concurrency
Posey	Poseyville	4.840	7.789	SR 68 east – Cynthiana	Northern end of SR 68 concurrency
Posey	Poseyville	5.588– 5.739	8.993– 9.236	I-64 - St. Louis, Louisville	Exit number 12 on I-64
Gibson	Owensville	17.172	27.636	SR 65 – Evansville, Princeton	Northern terminus of SR 165
1.000 mi = 1.609 km; 1.000 km = 0.621 mi: Concurrency terminus
