= Crawleyville, Indiana =

- Unincorporated community
- Location within Indiana Location within the United States
- Coordinates: 38°17′0.17″N 87°50′0.11″W
- Country: United States
- State: Indiana
- County: Gibson
- Township: Wabash
- Elevation: 384 ft (117 m)
- ZIP code: 47665
- GNIS feature ID: 433104

Crawleyville (also Crowley or Crowleyville) is an unincorporated community located along the Wabash River in Wabash Township in Gibson County. In the early 1900s, Crawleyville was an active community of farmers and fishermen.

The first settlement at Crawleyville was made in 1811.
