= North Posey High School =

Location
- 5900 High School Road; Poseyville address, Indiana 47633; United States; 38.142104°N 87.801916°W

Information
- Type: Public high school
- Established: 1959
- School district: MSD of North Posey
- Principal: Sean Fisher
- Teaching staff: 36.08 (FTE)
- Grades: 9-12
- Enrollment: 442 (2023-2024)
- Student to teacher ratio: 12.25
- Color
- Athletics conference: Pocket Athletic Conference
- Team name: Vikings
- Rival: Mt. Vernon High School
- Yearbook: Valhalla
- Website: North Posey High School

North Posey Senior High School is a public high school located in Posey County, Indiana, with a Poseyville postal address. North Posey is the high school for the MSD of North Posey County, which includes Bethel, Robb, Smith, Harmony, Center and Robinson Townships in Posey County, Indiana.

The school district includes the towns of Poseyville, New Harmony, Cynthiana and Griffin. The census-designated place of Parkers Settlement is in the district.

== History ==
Plans to build a unified secondary school for the district were to commence in fall 1957.

North Posey was opened in 1959, after the four separate schools of Poseyville, Cynthiana, Wadesville and Griffin consolidated.

In 2012, New Harmony School consolidated with North Posey.

The New Harmony consolidation meant that people from that community could take Advanced Placement courses, as the New Harmony School did not have those classes. Additionally, North Posey had American football teams and New Harmony did not.

== Campus ==
The facility is 2.5 miles (4.0 km) from Poseyville, to the southwest.

As of 1957 the plans were for a 40 acres (16 ha) site.

== Athletics ==
=== Teams ===
North Posey's athletic teams are nicknamed the Vikings and the school's colors are red and black. The Vikings compete in the Pocket Athletic Conference. North Posey competes in the following sports:

- Boys American Football
- Girls Volleyball
- Girls Softball
- Boys Baseball
- Boys Wrestling
- Girls and Boys Basketball
- Boys and Girls track & field
- Boys and Girls soccer
- Boys and Girls golf
- Boys and Girls tennis
- Boys an Girls swimming

=== State championships ===
Baseball

- 2005 Indiana 2A Champions
- 2006 Indiana 2A Champions

Softball

- 2023 Indiana 2A Champions

=== Record Book (Season/ Career Statistical Leaders) ===
- Softball - Erin Hoehn 13 HR's in the 2022 season and 20 pitching wins in 2023 season
- Baseball - Ethan Mansfield 136 career hits, 51 hits and 0.520 BA in 2025 season. Jared Baehl 11 HR's and 52 RBI in 2006 season.
- Basketball - Josiah Ricketts 2078 career points, 602 points in 2020 season
- Football - Jed Galvin 95 career TD's, 31 TD's in 2023 season

=== All-State Athletes (First Team by Coaches Association) ===
- Softball - Erin Hoehn (2021,2022,2023), Kayla Sanford (2016)
- Baseball - Ethan Mansfield (2025), Colton Martin (2013), Kelly Schmitt (2001), Tom Carl (1982)
- Basketball - Josiah Ricketts (2020)
- Football - Lennox Stone (2025), Jed Galvin (2023,2024), Gavin Meyers (2024), Kalob Egan (2023), Liam Stone (2023), Jace Gauer (2023), Devin Lintzenich (2021), Jesse Kissel (2017), Alex Stewart (2017), Dalton Rankin (2016), James Marshall (2014), Lance Inkenbrandt (2014), Wes Harness (2012,2013), Nick Neidig (2012), Austin Little (2012), Colton Motz (2011), Bryce Koester (2011), Brandon Baumgart (2010), Bryce Pearson (2009), Cory Little (2009), Michael Smith (2008), Frank Rynkiewicz (2008), Matthew Scheller (2006), Jake Voegel (2005), Ryan Kerney (2005), Jacob Cater (2005), Jared Baehl (2005), Bryan Will (2004), Nick Hargrave (2003), Chris Stoneberger (2003), Adam Will (2000), Korey Mauk (1999), Seth Morris (1997), Chris Sapp (1996,1997), Scott Singleton (1996), Marc Mitchell (1995), Neil Laughbaum (1995), John Heusmann (1995), Chase Akers (1993), Jared O’Risky(1993), Kurt France (1986), Jim Brandenstein (1984), Joe Neidig (1982), Lester Seib (1981), Tony Brandenstein (1981)

== Demographics ==
96.9% of the student population at North Posey Sr. High School identify as White American (Caucasian), making up the majority of the student body. For the 2014/2015 school year, there were 477 students enrolled in grades 9 through 12. The student body makeup is 51% male and 49% female.

== Facilities ==
North Posey High School has a 2,000 seat newly remodeled basketball court. There is also a second auxiliary gym, baseball and softball field, a soccer field, a football/track stadium and 5 tennis courts. The football field was upgraded from natural grass to artificial turf in 2019.

== Notable alumni ==
- John Hostettler (1979) – Former six-term Republican Representative of Indiana's 8th congressional district (1995–2007)

== See also ==
- List of high schools in Indiana
