= Robinson Township, Posey County, Indiana =

Robinson Township
- Township
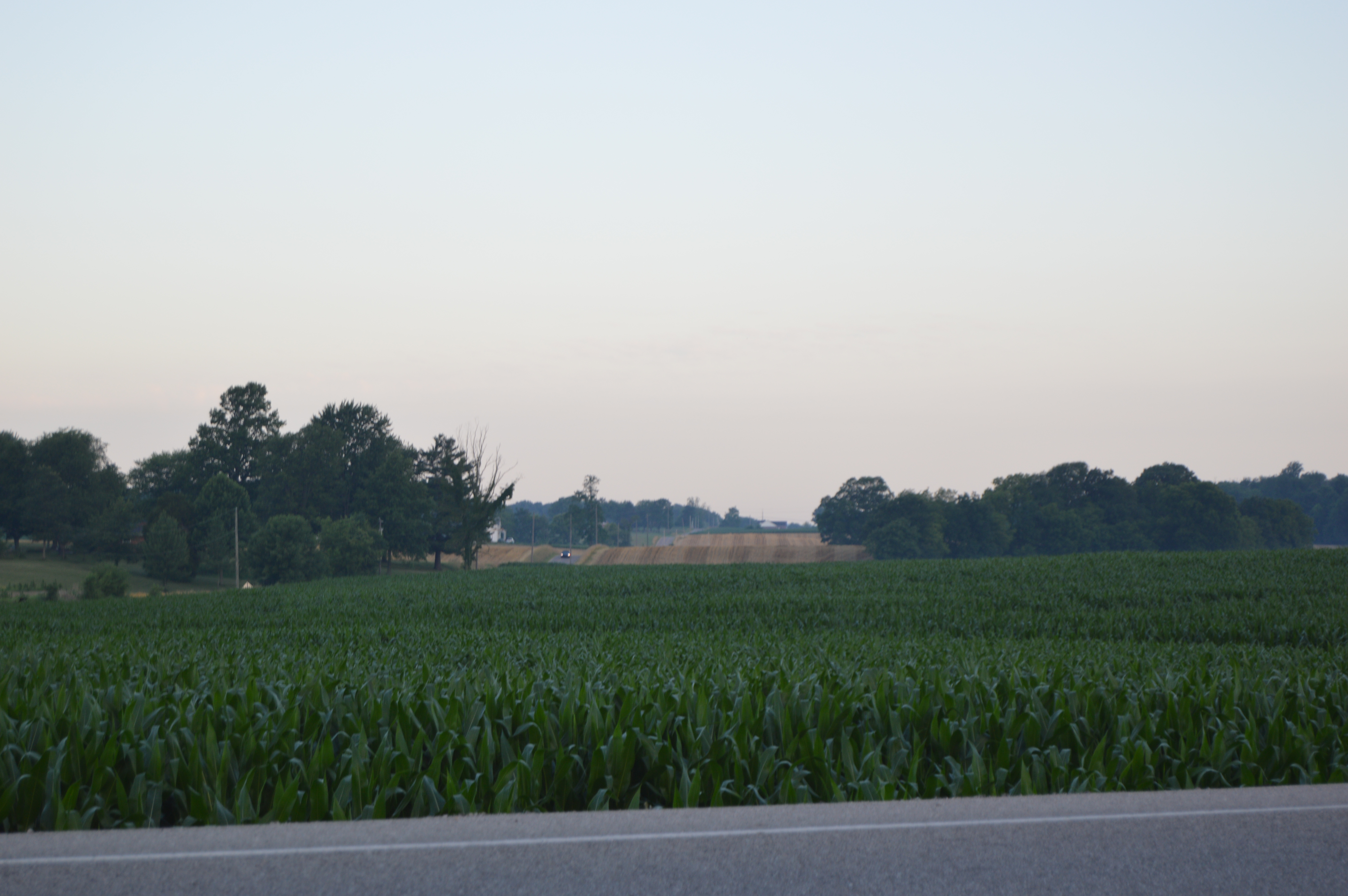
- State Road 66 southeast of Blairsville

- Coordinates: 38°03′01″N 87°45′03″W
- Country: United States
- State: Indiana
- County: Posey

Government
  - Type: Indiana township

Area
  - Total: 39.14 sq mi (101.37 km^{2})
  - Land: 39.13 sq mi (101.34 km^{2})
  - Water: 0.015 sq mi (0.04 km^{2})
- Elevation: 460 ft (140 m)

Population (2020)
  - Total: 3,855
  - Density: 98.52/sq mi (38.04/km^{2})
- FIPS code: 18-65124
- GNIS feature ID: 453806

Robinson Township is one of ten townships in Posey County, Indiana. As of the 2020 census, its population was 3,855.

Robinson Township was named at an unknown date for Jonathan Robinson, an early settler.

Historical population
| Census | Pop. | Note | %± |
|---|---|---|---|
| 1890 | 1,638 | | — |
| 1900 | 1,641 | | 0.2% |
| 1910 | 1,502 | | −8.5% |
| 1920 | 1,307 | | −13.0% |
| 1930 | 1,162 | | −11.1% |
| 1940 | 1,198 | | 3.1% |
| 1950 | 1,360 | | 13.5% |
| 1960 | 1,544 | | 13.5% |
| 1970 | 2,218 | | 43.7% |
| 1980 | 3,750 | | 69.1% |
| 1990 | 3,863 | | 3.0% |
| 2000 | 3,976 | | 2.9% |
| 2010 | 3,942 | | −0.9% |
| 2020 | 3,855 | | −2.2% |
Source: US Decennial Census

== Unincorporated places ==
- Blairsville
- Lippe
- Parkers Settlement
- St. Wendel

== Education ==
It is within the Metropolitan School District of North Posey County, which operates North Posey High School.
