= Harmony Township, Posey County, Indiana =

Harmony Township Posey County
- Township
- Coordinates: 38°07′18″N 87°54′24″W
- Country: United States
- State: Indiana
- County: Posey

Government
  - Type: Indiana township

Area
  - Total: 35.93 sq mi (93.05 km^{2})
  - Land: 35.24 sq mi (91.28 km^{2})
  - Water: 0.68 sq mi (1.77 km^{2})
- Elevation: 407 ft (124 m)

Population (2020)
  - Total: 1,245
  - Density: 35.33/sq mi (13.64/km^{2})
- FIPS code: 18-31504
- GNIS feature ID: 453374

Harmony Township is one of ten townships in Posey County, Indiana. As of the 2020 census, its population was 1,245.

Historical population
Census	Pop.	Note	%±
1890	2,304		—
1900	2,443		6.0%
1910	2,168		−11.3%
1920	1,841		−15.1%
1930	1,793		−2.6%
1940	2,151		20.0%
1950	2,107		−2.0%
1960	1,809		−14.1%
1970	1,618		−10.6%
1980	1,536		−5.1%
1990	1,432		−6.8%
2000	1,473		2.9%
2010	1,338		−9.2%
2020	1,245		−7.0%
Source: US Decennial Census

== History ==
Harmony Township was organized in 1821. A large share of the first settlers being Harmonites caused the name to be selected.

The James Elliott Farm and New Harmony Historic District are listed on the National Register of Historic Places.

== Adjacent townships ==
- Indiana
  - Posey County
    - Center Township (Southeast)
    - Lynn Township (South)
    - Robb Township (Northeast)
- Illinois
  - White County
    - Hawthorne Township (Southwest)
    - Phillips Township (Northwest)

== Cities ==
- New Harmony

== Unincorporated places ==
- Rapture

== Education ==
It is within the Metropolitan School District of North Posey County, which operates North Posey High School.

New Harmony Town and Township Consolidated Schools consolidated into MSD of North Posey County as of 2012.
