= Interstate 64 in Indiana =

Section of Interstate Highway in Indiana

Interstate 64
- I-64 highlighted in red

Route information
- Maintained by INDOT
- Length: 123.33 mi (198.48 km)
- Existed: 1956–present
- NHS: Entire route

Major junctions
- West end: I-64 at the Illinois state line near Griffin
- US 41 near Haubstadt; I-69 / SR 57 near Elberfeld; US 231 near Dale; SR 62 / SR 64 in Georgetown; US 150 near Greenville; I-265 / SR 62 in New Albany
- East end: I-64 / US 150 at the Kentucky state line in New Albany

Location
- Country: United States
- State: Indiana
- Counties: Posey, Vanderburgh, Gibson, Warrick, Spencer, Dubois, Perry, Crawford, Harrison, Floyd

Highway system
- Interstate Highway System; Main; Auxiliary; Suffixed; Business; Future; Indiana State Highway System; Interstate; US; State; Scenic
← SR 63	→ SR 64

Interstate 64 (I-64) in the US state of Indiana is a major east–west highway providing access between Illinois and Kentucky. It passes through southern Indiana as part of its connection between the two metropolitan areas of St Louis, Missouri, and Louisville, Kentucky.

== Route description ==
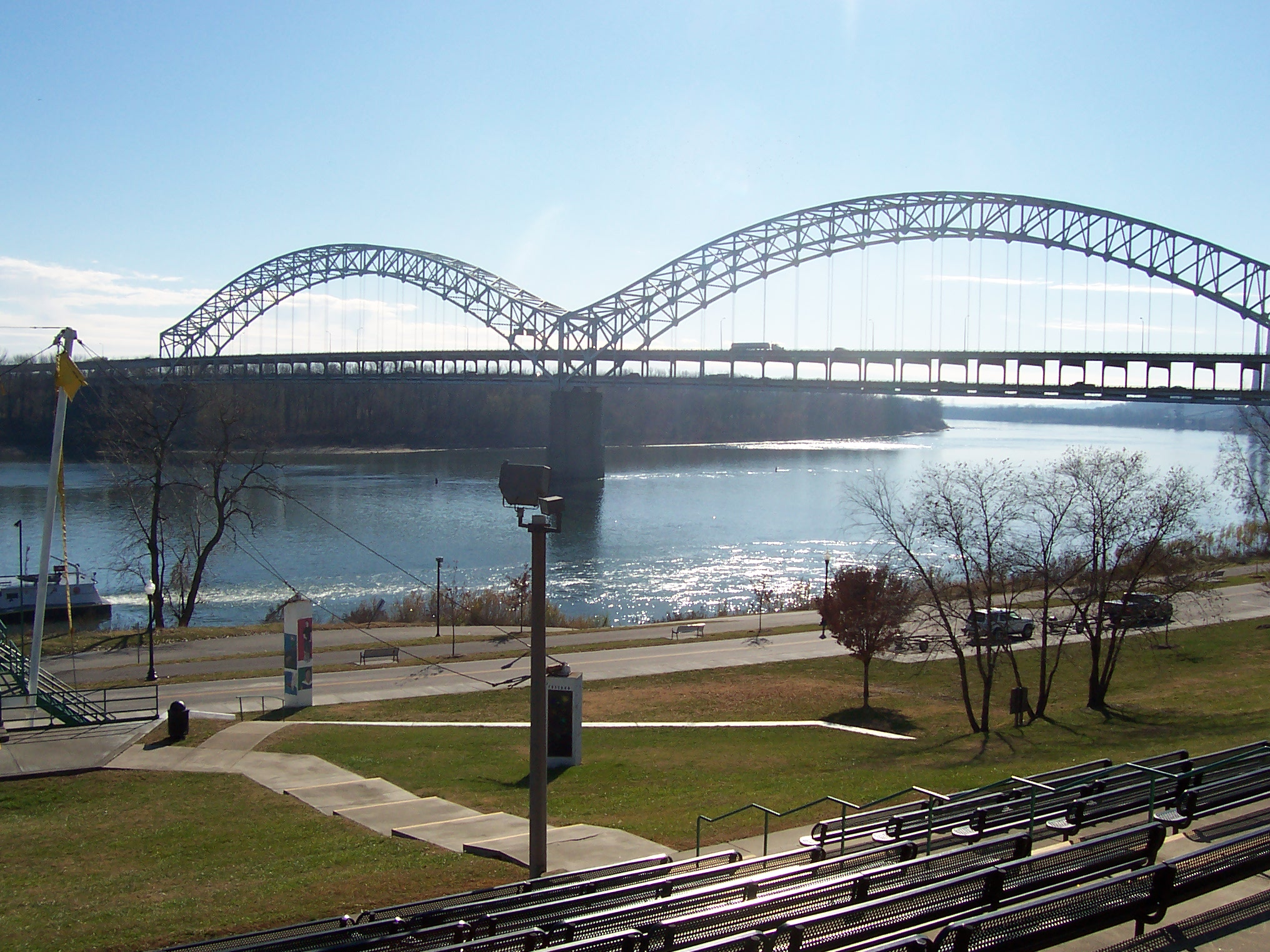
The Sherman Minton Bridge across the Ohio River

I-64 has a route through the state which travels through mostly rural areas, passing through all four Indiana counties of the Evansville metropolitan area, but the final portion of the route is encompassed by the Louisville metropolitan area. The highway enters Indiana after crossing the Wabash River from Illinois. It passes through Posey County before straddling the Gibson–Vanderburgh county line, where it connects with U.S. Highway 41 (US 41) and I-69 which travels south to Evansville and north to Martinsville, both intersections being within Gibson County. Continuing eastward, I-64 passes through Warrick County before straddling the Spencer–Dubois county line, which is also the boundary between the Central and the Eastern time zones. It continues into and through Perry County (back in the Central Time Zone), before crossing into Crawford County where, from that point on, it remains in the Eastern Time Zone. (Between milemarkers 60 and 80, I-64 crosses the Central/Eastern time zone boundary five times.) This portion of the route also travels through Hoosier National Forest through several sharp valleys and steep hills, largely in Perry, Crawford, and Harrison counties with some large hills in Spencer and Dubois counties as well. Beyond the forest, the Interstate travels through Harrison and Floyd counties, before crossing the Sherman Minton Bridge over the Ohio River into Louisville, Kentucky. Between Spencer County and Louisville, the highway traverses sharp valleys and hills.

== History ==
I-64 was built across the eastern US between St. Louis and the Hampton Roads area of Virginia in the 1960s and 1970s. In Indiana, the highway was originally routed along US 50, but political influences from Evansville rerouted the highway along US 460 (since decommissioned in Indiana).

=== Initial construction ===
Like all Interstate highways in Indiana, I-64 was constructed in segments which, when all were complete, made up the route in use today. There were eight segments in all, with the first to be opened being the very short segment from the Kentucky state line on the Sherman Minton Bridge to Spring Street in New Albany, which became operational on December 22, 1961. By the end of 1968, two more segments consisting of 12.94 miles (20.82 km) had opened, one near each end of the route in the state. By the end of 1972, two more segments were completed in southwestern Indiana, and I-64 was open from State Road 57 (SR 57; later, also I-164 and now part of the extension of I-69) north of Evansville west to the Illinois state line. The three final segments of I-64 in the long stretch between SR 57 and SR 64 in Floyd County were completed later in the decade, with the final stretch opening near Ferdinand in 1979.

=== Subsequent improvements and developments ===
The Sherman Minton Bridge across the Ohio River was closed in 2011 after two major cracks were found. However, the bridge reopened the following February after extensive repairs.

== Future ==
The Ohio River Bridges Project in the Louisville/Falls City metro area, while mainly affecting I-65 and I-265, has sparked opposition, most notably 8664, which calls for I-64 to be rerouted out of downtown Louisville (and, thus, the Minton Bridge) onto the new, extended route for I-265. They suggest the portion of I-64 between the current I-64/I-265 interchange in New Albany and its Kentucky counterpart be resigned as I-364.

== Exit list ==
County	Location	mi	km	Exit	Destinations	Notes
Wabash River		0.0	0.0		I-64 west	Continuation into Illinois
Posey	Griffin	4.3	6.9	4	SR 69 south – New Harmony, Mount Vernon, Griffin	Northern terminus of SR 69
Posey	Poseyville	11.9	19.2	12	SR 165 – Poseyville	
Vanderburgh	Armstrong Township	17.6	28.3	18	SR 65 – Cynthiana, Evansville	
Vanderburgh–Gibson county line	Scott–Johnson township line	24.9	40.1	25	US 41 – Evansville, Terre Haute	Signed as 25A (south) and 25B (north)
Gibson–Warrick county line	Johnson–Greer township line	29.4	47.3	29	I-69 / SR 57 – Evansville, Indianapolis	I-69 exits 21A-B; signed as exits 29A (south) and 29B (north); Former Interstate 164
Warrick	Lynnville	39.3	63.2	39	SR 61 – Lynnville, Boonville	
Warrick	Pigeon Township	53.5	86.1	54	SR 161 – Holland, Tennyson	
Spencer	Dale	56.4	90.8	57	US 231 – Dale, Huntingburg, Jasper	Signed as exits 57A (south) and 57B (north); Central time zone
Dubois–Spencer county line	Ferdinand	62.9	101.2	63	SR 162 – Ferdinand, Jasper, Santa Claus	Exit 63 is in Dubois County in Eastern time zone; re-enters Spencer County/Central time zone; re-enters Dubois County/Eastern time zone
Perry	Clark Township	72.2	116.2	72	SR 145 – Birdseye, Bristow	Central time zone
Perry	Oil Township	78.4	126.2	79	SR 37 – Tell City	Central time zone
Crawford	Union Township	85.7	137.9	86	SR 237 north – English, Sulphur	Terminus of SR 237; Eastern time zone
Crawford	Jennings Township	92.0	148.1	92	SR 66 – Marengo, Leavenworth	
Harrison	Corydon	105.3	169.5	105	SR 135 – Palmyra, Corydon	
Harrison	Franklin Township	112.5	181.1	113	Lanesville	
Floyd	Edwardsville	117.8	189.6	118	SR 64 west / SR 62 west – Edwardsville, Georgetown	Western end of SR 62 overlap; eastern terminus of SR 64
Floyd	New Albany	119.4	192.2	119	US 150 west – Greenville	Western end of US 150 concurrency
Floyd	New Albany	121.5	195.5	121	I-265 east (Lee H. Hamilton Freeway) / SR 62 east to I-65	I-265 exit 41; eastern end of SR 62 concurrency.
Floyd	New Albany	123.3	198.4	123	New Albany	Unsigned SR 111
Ohio River		123.33	198.48	Sherman Minton Bridge		
Ohio River		123.33	198.48		I-64 east / US 150 east	Continuation into Kentucky
1.000 mi = 1.609 km; 1.000 km = 0.621 mi: Concurrency terminus

== See also ==
Interstate 64
Previous state: Illinois	Indiana	Next state: Kentucky
