= Cynthiana, Indiana =

- Logo
- Motto: "Happiness Starts Here"
- Location of Cynthiana in Posey County, Indiana.
- Coordinates: 38°11′14″N 87°42′31″W
- Country: United States
- State: Indiana
- County: Posey
- Township: Smith
- Platted: 1817
- Incorporated: April 22, 1896

Area
  - Total: 0.40 sq mi (1.03 km^{2})
  - Land: 0.40 sq mi (1.03 km^{2})
  - Water: 0 sq mi (0.00 km^{2})
- Elevation: 469 ft (143 m)

Population (2020)
  - Total: 552
  - Density: 1,384.1/sq mi (534.42/km^{2})
- Time zone: UTC-6 (CST)
  - Summer (DST): UTC-5 (CDT)
- ZIP code: 47612
- Area code: 812
- FIPS code: 18-16534
- GNIS feature ID: 2396673
- Website: townofcynthiana.org

Cynthiana is a town in Smith Township, Posey County, in the U.S. state of Indiana. The population was 552 at the 2020 census.

== History ==
Cynthiana was named for Cynthiana, Kentucky, from whence on September 25, 1815, a group of 44 settlers had come. More settlers from the same area continued to migrate to the area over the following several years. On March 6, 1817, the town was laid out by William Davis, with the plat being recorded on March 17, 1817. It was not until April 22, 1896, that the town incorporated.

On September 23, 1815, Thomas Duncan had made a land entry for the SE 1/4 of Section 11, Township 4 South, Range 11 West of the Second Principal Meridian, receiving a patent to the land on December 20, 1817. It was on March 24, 1818, that he sold the 58½ acres for the townsite of Cynthiana to William Davis.

A post office has been in operation at Cynthiana since 1820.

== Geography ==
According to the 2010 census, Cynthiana has a total area of 0.4 square miles (1.04 km^{2}), all land.

== Demographics ==
Historical population
Census	Pop.	Note	%±
1880	313		—
1900	502		—
1910	610		21.5%
1920	568		−6.9%
1930	556		−2.1%
1940	535		−3.8%
1950	591		10.5%
1960	663		12.2%
1970	793		19.6%
1980	874		10.2%
1990	669		−23.5%
2000	693		3.6%
2010	545		−21.4%
2020	552		1.3%
U.S. Decennial Census

=== 2010 census ===
As of the census of 2010, there were 545 people, 236 households, and 154 families living in the town. The population density was 1,362.5 inhabitants per square mile (526.1/km^{2}). There were 272 housing units at an average density of 680.0 per square mile (262.5/km^{2}). The racial makeup of the town was 96.5% White, 0.2% African American, 0.2% Native American, 0.2% Asian, 0.4% from other races, and 2.6% from two or more races. Hispanic or Latino of any race were 0.6% of the population.

There were 236 households, of which 30.9% had children under the age of 18 living with them, 48.3% were married couples living together, 11.4% had a female householder with no husband present, 5.5% had a male householder with no wife present, and 34.7% were non-families. 31.4% of all households were made up of individuals, and 14.4% had someone living alone who was 65 years of age or older. The average household size was 2.31 and the average family size was 2.80.

The median age in the town was 42.5 years. 22.6% of residents were under the age of 18; 7.3% were between the ages of 18 and 24; 23.3% were from 25 to 44; 31.9% were from 45 to 64; and 14.9% were 65 years of age or older. The gender makeup of the town was 49.7% male and 50.3% female.

=== 2000 census ===
As of the census of 2000, there were 693 people, 265 households, and 195 families living in the town. The population density was 1,725.1 inhabitants per square mile (666.1/km^{2}). There were 286 housing units at an average density of 711.9 per square mile (274.9/km^{2}). The racial makeup of the town was 98.56% White, 0.43% Native American, 0.29% Asian, and 0.72% from two or more races.

There were 265 households, out of which 34.0% had children under the age of 18 living with them, 64.2% were married couples living together, 7.5% had a female householder with no husband present, and 26.4% were non-families. 24.5% of all households were made up of individuals, and 12.5% had someone living alone who was 65 years of age or older. The average household size was 2.62 and the average family size was 3.11.

In the town, the population was spread out, with 27.7% under the age of 18, 7.1% from 18 to 24, 29.7% from 25 to 44, 22.4% from 45 to 64, and 13.1% who were 65 years of age or older. The median age was 36 years. For every 100 females, there were 96.3 males. For every 100 females age 18 and over, there were 97.2 males.

The median income for a household in the town was $37,589, and the median income for a family was $42,000. Males had a median income of $35,286 versus $20,583 for females. The per capita income for the town was $15,313. About 5.3% of families and 9.7% of the population were below the poverty line, including 11.9% of those under age 18 and 18.5% of those age 65 or over.

== Education ==
The town and northern half of Posey County is served by the MSD of North Posey County, which currently operates four schools:

- North Posey High School (9–12)
- North Posey Junior High School (7–8)
- North Elementary School (K–6)
- South Terrace Elementary School (K–6)

== Highways ==
- Interstate 64
- Indiana State Road 68
- Indiana State Road 65
