= WSDM (FM) =

Radio station in Wadesville, Indiana

- Wadesville, Indiana; United States
- Broadcast area: Wadesville/Evansville, Indiana
- Frequency: 90.1 MHz
- Branding: Oldies 90.1

Programming
- Format: Oldies

Ownership
- Owner: The Innovation Center Inc
- Operator: Posey County Radio

History
- Former call signs: WXTZ (2002–2003); WRFM (2003); WXYR (2003); WRFM (2003–2004); WXIR (2004); WRFM (2004–2007); WENS (2007–2012)

Technical information
- Facility ID: 122333
- Class: A
- ERP: 6,000 watts vertical polarization only
- HAAT: 87 meters (285 ft)
- Transmitter coordinates: 37°56′3.00″N 87°55′35.00″W

Links
- Webcast: Listen Live
- Website: www.poseycountyradio.com

WSDM (90.1 MHz) is an FM radio station broadcasting an oldies radio format.
