= Griffin, Indiana =

- Town
- Town of Griffin
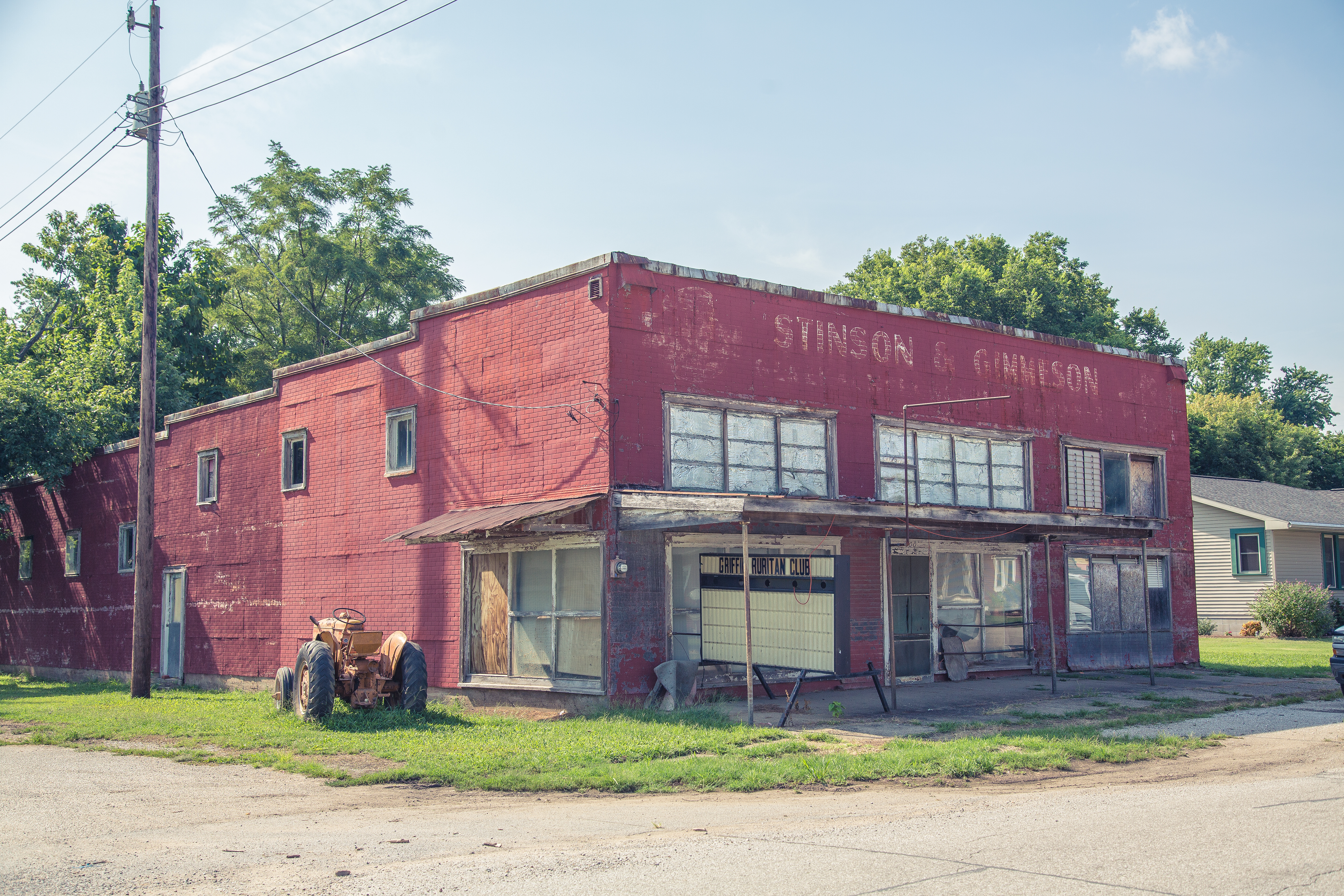

- Location of Griffin in Posey County, Indiana.
- Coordinates: 38°12′16″N 87°54′54″W
- Country: United States
- State: Indiana
- County: Posey
- Township: Bethel

Area
  - Total: 0.069 sq mi (0.18 km^{2})
  - Land: 0.069 sq mi (0.18 km^{2})
  - Water: 0 sq mi (0.00 km^{2})
- Elevation: 384 ft (117 m)

Population (2020)
  - Total: 143
  - Density: 2,091.6/sq mi (807.58/km^{2})
- Time zone: UTC-6 (CST)
  - Summer (DST): UTC-5 (CDT)
- ZIP code: 47616
- Area codes: 812, 930
- FIPS code: 18-30024
- GNIS feature ID: 2396978

Griffin is a town in Bethel Township, Posey County, in the U.S. state of Indiana. The population was 143 at the 2020 census.

== History ==
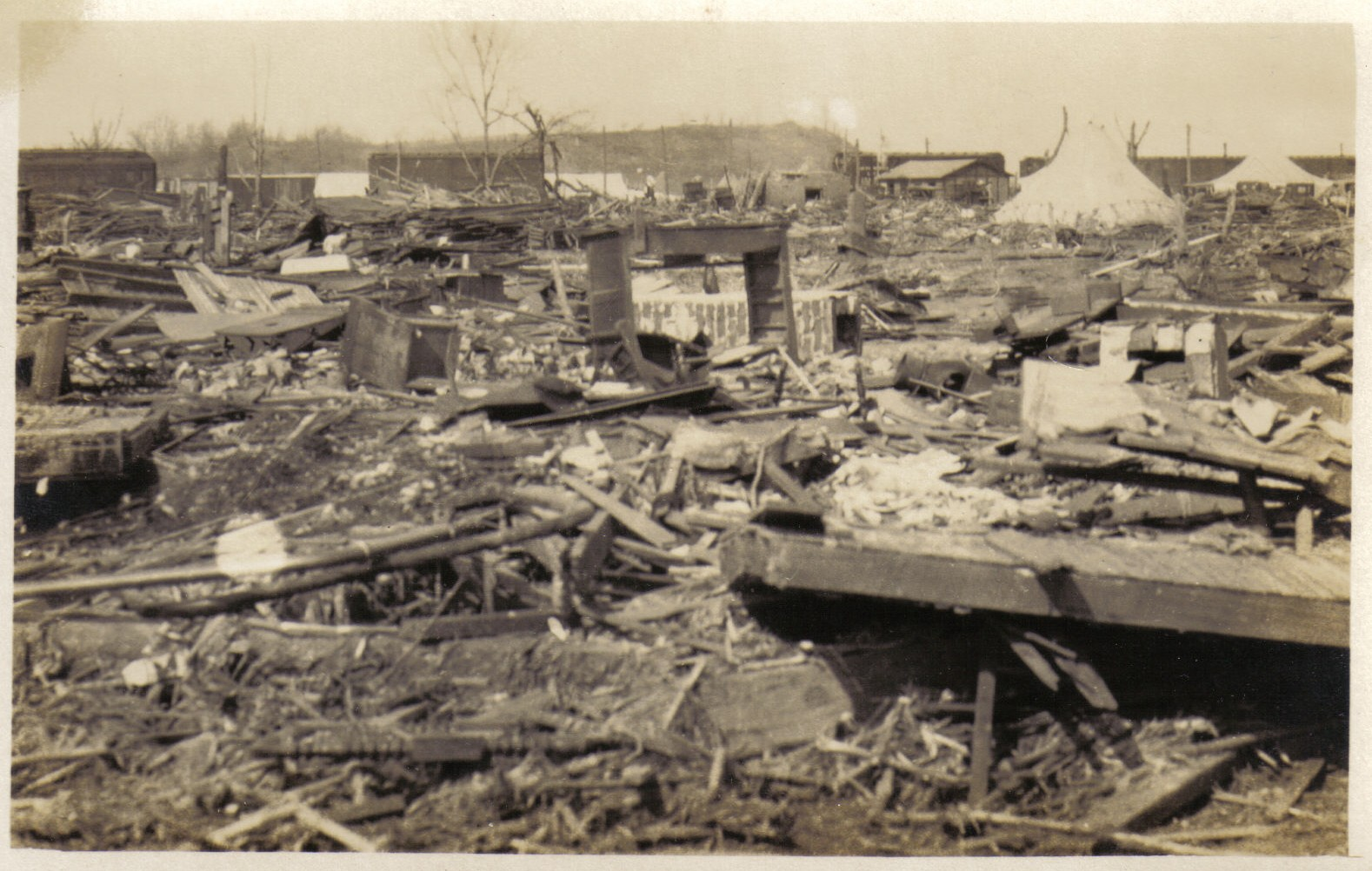
Ruins of the town of Griffin, Indiana, after the tornado where 44 people were killed

Griffin was originally called Price's Station, and under the latter name was laid out in 1881 by William Price, and named for him. The present name honors Samuel Griffin, an early postmaster. A post office called Griffin has been in operation since 1881.

The town was destroyed by the 1925 Tri-State tornado on the afternoon of March 18, 1925, killing 44 people and injuring hundreds. In 1972, a nearby outdoor rock concert Erie Canal Soda Pop Festival caused quite a stir in the town over the course of three days. Locally, the fest was called the Bull Island rock fest, based on the location of the festival.

== Geography ==
Griffin is located at 38°12′16″N 87°54′54″W (38.204406, -87.915033).

According to the 2010 census, Griffin has a total area of 0.07 square miles (0.18 km^{2}), all land.

== Demographics ==
Historical population
| Census | Pop. | Note | %± |
|---|---|---|---|
| 1910 | 275 | | — |
| 1920 | 341 | | 24.0% |
| 1930 | 208 | | −39.0% |
| 1940 | 386 | | 85.6% |
| 1950 | 249 | | −35.5% |
| 1960 | 212 | | −14.9% |
| 1970 | 178 | | −16.0% |
| 1980 | 192 | | 7.9% |
| 1990 | 171 | | −10.9% |
| 2000 | 160 | | −6.4% |
| 2010 | 172 | | 7.5% |
| 2020 | 143 | | −16.9% |
U.S. Decennial Census

=== 2010 census ===
As of the census of 2010, there were 172 people, 69 households, and 51 families living in the town. The population density was 2,457.1 inhabitants per square mile (948.7/km^{2}). There were 75 housing units at an average density of 1,071.4 per square mile (413.7/km^{2}). The racial makeup of the town was 98.8% White, 0.6% African American, and 0.6% from two or more races.

There were 69 households, of which 33.3% had children under the age of 18 living with them, 62.3% were married couples living together, 7.2% had a female householder with no husband present, 4.3% had a male householder with no wife present, and 26.1% were non-families. 21.7% of all households were made up of individuals, and 14.4% had someone living alone who was 65 years of age or older. The average household size was 2.49 and the average family size was 2.94.

The median age in the town was 37.3 years. 26.2% of residents were under the age of 18; 5.3% were between the ages of 18 and 24; 26.1% were from 25 to 44; 27.3% were from 45 to 64; and 15.1% were 65 years of age or older. The gender makeup of the town was 43.0% male and 57.0% female.

=== 2000 census ===
As of the census of 2000, there were 160 people, 73 households, and 42 families living in the town. The population density was 2,363.3 inhabitants per square mile (912.5/km^{2}). There were 81 housing units at an average density of 1,196.4 per square mile (461.9/km^{2}). The racial makeup of the town was 99.38% White, and 0.62% from two or more races.

There were 73 households, out of which 17.8% had children under the age of 18 living with them, 52.1% were married couples living together, 5.5% had a female householder with no husband present, and 41.1% were non-families. 34.2% of all households were made up of individuals, and 26.0% had someone living alone who was 65 years of age or older. The average household size was 2.19 and the average family size was 2.84.

In the town, the population was spread out, with 19.4% under the age of 18, 8.8% from 18 to 24, 18.8% from 25 to 44, 33.1% from 45 to 64, and 20.0% who were 65 years of age or older. The median age was 47 years. For every 100 females, there were 88.2 males. For every 100 females age 18 and over, there were 87.0 males.

The median income for a household in the town was $26,786, and the median income for a family was $42,083. Males had a median income of $28,125 versus $18,750 for females. The per capita income for the town was $18,074. About 7.0% of families and 17.9% of the population were below the poverty line, including 40.7% of those under the age of eighteen and 22.2% of those 65 or over.

== Education ==
The town and northern half of Posey County is served by the MSD of North Posey County, which currently operates four schools:

- North Posey High School (9–12)
- North Posey Junior High School (7–8)
- North Elementary School (K–6)
- South Terrace Elementary School (K–6)

Prior to 1959, the community had its own high school. The school colors were red and white, and the mascot was the tornadoes, named after the Tri-State tornado outbreak. That year, the high school merged into North Posey High.

== Highways ==
- Interstate 64
- Indiana State Road 69
