= Poseyville, Indiana =

- Town
- Town of Poseyville
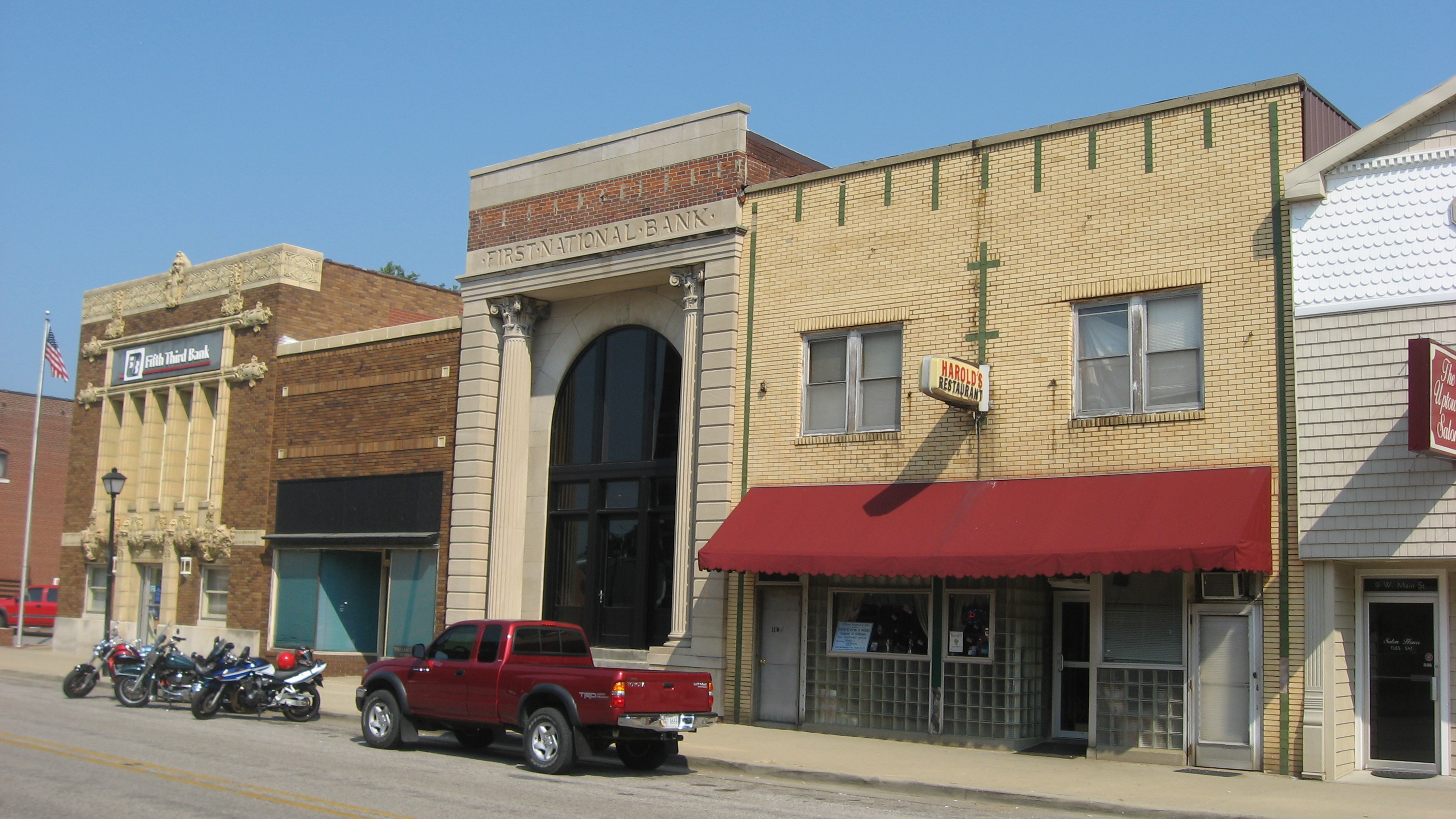
- Downtown Poseyville

- Seal

- Location of Poseyville in Posey County, Indiana.
- Coordinates: 38°10′11″N 87°47′00″W
- Country: United States
- State: Indiana
- County: Posey
- Township: Robb

Area
  - Total: 0.64 sq mi (1.67 km^{2})
  - Land: 0.64 sq mi (1.67 km^{2})
  - Water: 0 sq mi (0.00 km^{2}) 0%
- Elevation: 440 ft (130 m)

Population (2020)
  - Total: 966
  - Density: 1,497/sq mi (577.9/km^{2})
- Time zone: UTC-6 (CST)
  - Summer (DST): UTC-5 (CDT)
- ZIP code: 47633
- Area code: 812
- FIPS code: 18-61416
- GNIS feature ID: 2396864
- Website: www.poseyville.us

Poseyville is a town in Robb Township, Posey County, in the U.S. state of Indiana. The population was 966 at the 2020 census.

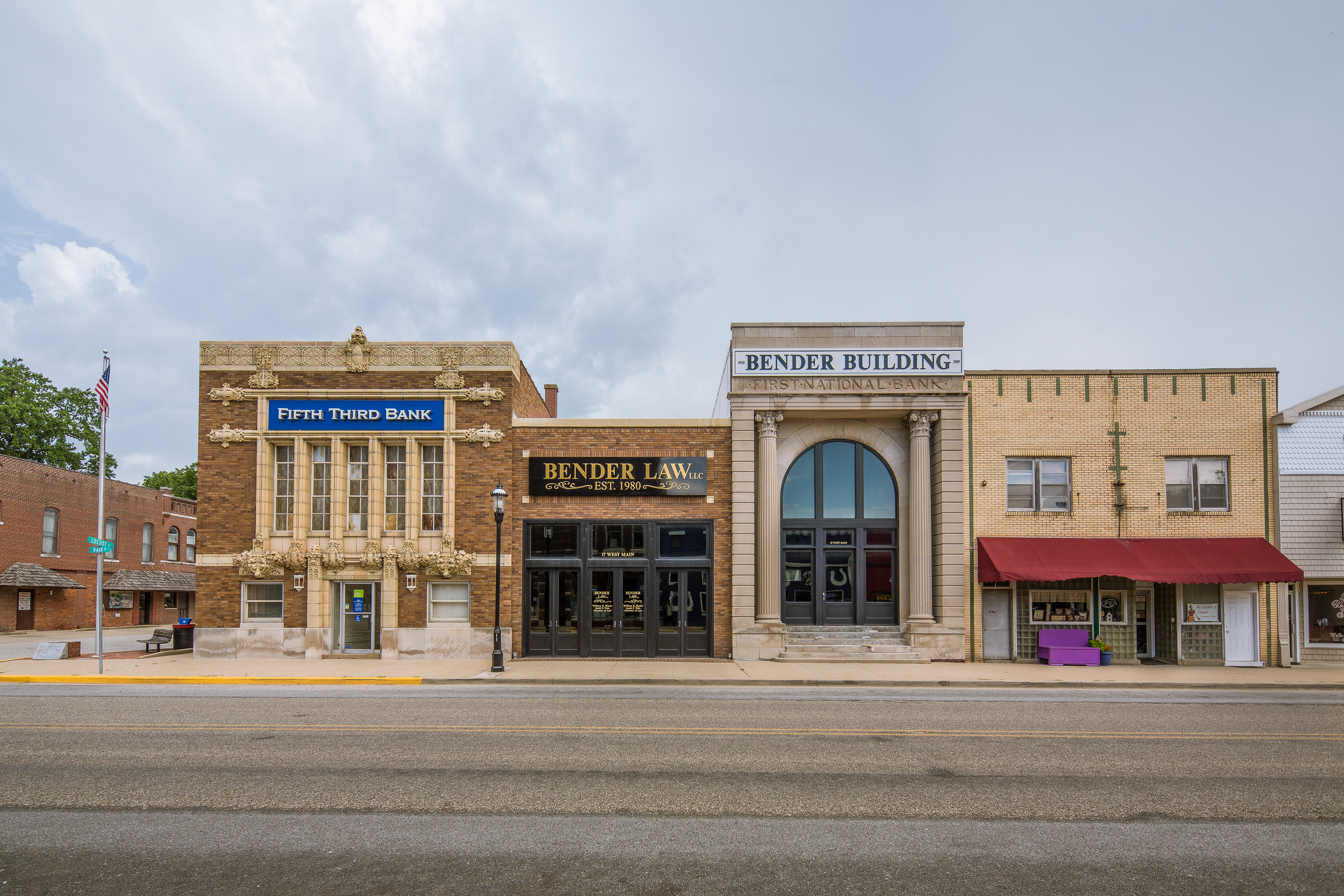
Photo from Small Town Indiana photo survey.

== History ==
The town of Poseyville was originally called Palestine when the town was first surveyed and laid out by James Smith on February 28, 1840. The town was set up along the New Harmony-Princeton coach line. The new town was recorded at the Posey County Recorder's Office on November 20, 1840.

Palestine was renamed Poseyville when the town got its first post office on February 10, 1843, due to another town named Palestine, Indiana, which already had a post office. The name was officially approved and changed by the Indiana State Legislature on December 26, 1844, but did not get recorded locally. The history books of Posey County state the town name was changed in 1852. This was the year that the town was first referred to as Poseyville in the county records. This was due to the addition of two new plats: Cale's Enlargement and Fletchall's Enlargement. This tripled the size of the town.

The Bozeman-Waters National Bank was listed on the National Register of Historic Places in 1987.

== Geography ==
According to the 2010 census, Poseyville has a total area of 0.65 square miles (1.68 km^{2}), all land.

=== Climate ===
The climate in this area is characterized by hot, humid summers and generally mild to cool winters. According to the Köppen Climate Classification system, Poseyville has a humid subtropical climate, abbreviated "Cfa" on climate maps.

== Education ==
The town and northern half of Posey County is served by the MSD of North Posey County, which currently operates four schools:

- North Posey High School (9–12)
- North Posey Junior High School (7–8)
- North Elementary School (K–6) in Poseyville
- South Terrace Elementary School (K–6)

The town has a lending library, the Poseyville Carnegie Public Library.

== Demographics ==
Historical population
Census	Pop.	Note	%±
1870	213		—
1890	571		—
1900	628		10.0%
1910	780		24.2%
1920	881		12.9%
1930	810		−8.1%
1940	948		17.0%
1950	1,005		6.0%
1960	997		−0.8%
1970	1,035		3.8%
1980	1,247		20.5%
1990	1,089		−12.7%
2000	1,187		9.0%
2010	1,045		−12.0%
2020	966		−7.6%
U.S. Decennial Census

=== 2010 census ===
As of the census of 2010, there were 1,045 people, 454 households, and 296 families living in the town. The population density was 1,607.7 inhabitants per square mile (620.7/km^{2}). There were 494 housing units at an average density of 760.0 per square mile (293.4/km^{2}). The racial makeup of the town was 98.9% White, 0.3% Native American, 0.2% Asian, and 0.6% from two or more races. Hispanic or Latino of any race were 0.2% of the population.

There were 454 households, of which 29.5% had children under the age of 18 living with them, 50.2% were married couples living together, 10.4% had a female householder with no husband present, 4.6% had a male householder with no wife present, and 34.8% were non-families. 32.6% of all households were made up of individuals, and 14.9% had someone living alone who was 65 years of age or older. The average household size was 2.30 and the average family size was 2.88.

The median age in the town was 44.1 years. 23% of residents were under the age of 18; 8.4% were between the ages of 18 and 24; 19.3% were from 25 to 44; 30.7% were from 45 to 64; and 18.6% were 65 years of age or older. The gender makeup of the town was 48.4% male and 51.6% female.

=== 2000 census ===
As of the census of 2000, there were 1,187 people, 458 households, and 315 families living in the town. The population density was 1,788.2 inhabitants per square mile (690.4/km^{2}). There were 490 housing units at an average density of 738.2 per square mile (285.0/km^{2}). The racial makeup of the town was 99.07% White, 0.08% African American, 0.34% Native American, and 0.51% from two or more races.

There were 458 households, out of which 34.9% had children under the age of 18 living with them, 57.9% were married couples living together, 9.0% had a female householder with no husband present, and 31.2% were non-families. 28.6% of all households were made up of individuals, and 16.8% had someone living alone who was 65 years of age or older. The average household size was 2.54 and the average family size was 3.16.

In the town, the population was spread out, with 28.6% under the age of 18, 6.4% from 18 to 24, 26.0% from 25 to 44, 19.3% from 45 to 64, and 19.6% who were 65 years of age or older. The median age was 38 years. For every 100 females, there were 96.5 males. For every 100 females age 18 and over, there were 88.6 males.

The median income for a household in the town was $37,604, and the median income for a family was $48,417. Males had a median income of $34,444 versus $22,292 for females. The per capita income for the town was $18,815. About 2.8% of families and 5.2% of the population were below the poverty line, including 5.5% of those under age 18 and 5.0% of those age 65 or over.

== Highways ==
- Interstate 64
- Indiana State Road 68
- Indiana State Road 165

== Notable people ==
- Charles W. Cushman, photographer
