= Robb Township, Posey County, Indiana =

Robb Township
- Township
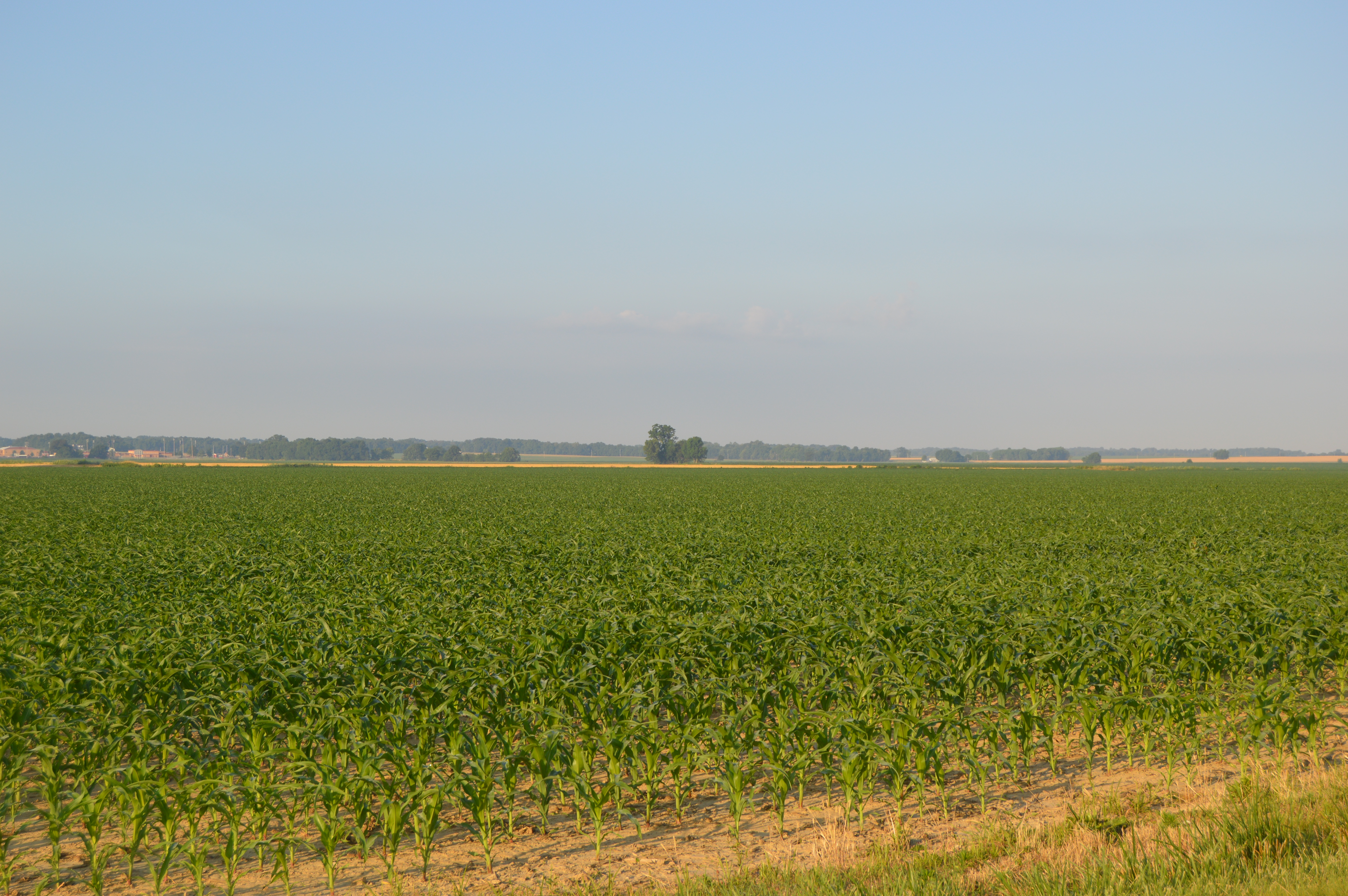
- Cornfields near Poseyville

- Coordinates: 38°10′39″N 87°49′38″W
- Country: United States
- State: Indiana
- County: Posey

Government
  - Type: Indiana township

Area
  - Total: 37.35 sq mi (96.73 km^{2})
  - Land: 37.3 sq mi (96.6 km^{2})
  - Water: 0.050 sq mi (0.13 km^{2})
- Elevation: 479 ft (146 m)

Population (2020)
  - Total: 1,743
  - Density: 46.7/sq mi (18.0/km^{2})
- FIPS code: 18-65052
- GNIS feature ID: 453805

Robb Township is one of ten townships in Posey County, Indiana. As of the 2020 census, its population was 1,743.

Historical population
Census	Pop.	Note	%±
1890	2,072		—
1900	2,109		1.8%
1910	2,042		−3.2%
1920	2,071		1.4%
1930	1,892		−8.6%
1940	2,027		7.1%
1950	2,112		4.2%
1960	1,821		−13.8%
1970	1,933		6.2%
1980	2,167		12.1%
1990	2,009		−7.3%
2000	2,074		3.2%
2010	1,881		−9.3%
2020	1,743		−7.3%
Source: US Decennial Census

== History ==
Robb Township was organized in 1817. The township was named for the Robb family of pioneer settlers.

== Towns ==
- Poseyville

== Unincorporated Places ==
- Stewartsville

== Education ==
It is within the Metropolitan School District of North Posey County, which operates North Posey High School.
