= National Register of Historic Places listings in Posey County, Indiana =

Location of Posey County in Indiana

This is a list of the National Register of Historic Places listings in Posey County, Indiana.

This is intended to be a complete list of the properties and districts on the National Register of Historic Places in Posey County, Indiana, United States. Latitude and longitude coordinates are provided for many National Register properties and districts; these locations may be seen together in a map.

There are 18 properties and districts listed on the National Register in the county, including one National Historic Landmark. Another two properties were once listed but have been removed.

Properties and districts located in incorporated areas display the name of the municipality, while properties and districts in unincorporated areas display the name of their civil township. Properties and districts split between multiple jurisdictions display the names of all jurisdictions.

This National Park Service list is complete through NPS recent listings posted November 21, 2025.

== Current listings ==
	Name on the Register	Image	Date listed	Location	City or town	Description
1	Ashworth Archaeological Site (12 Po 7)	Ashworth Archaeological Site (12 Po 7)	September 12, 1985 (#85002137)	Eastern side of State Road 69, about 1 mile (1.6 km) north of Hovey Lake; 37°51′00″N 87°56′10″W	Point Township	An archaeological site of the Caborn-Welborn variant of the Mississippian culture.
2	George Bentel House	George Bentel House	September 20, 1984 (#84001224)	Brewery and Granary St. 38°07′50″N 87°55′59″W	New Harmony	
3	Bozeman-Waters National Bank	Bozeman-Waters National Bank	October 1, 1987 (#87001768)	19 W. Main St. 38°10′12″N 87°47′02″W	Poseyville	
4	James Elliott Farm	James Elliott Farm	December 23, 2003 (#03001312)	Church St. (State Road 66), east of New Harmony; 38°07′44″N 87°55′23″W	Harmony Township	
5	Ludwig Epple House	Ludwig Epple House	June 21, 1984 (#84001227)	520 Granary St. 38°07′50″N 87°56′03″W	New Harmony	
6	William Gonnerman House	William Gonnerman House	December 19, 1985 (#85003192)	521 W. 2nd St. 37°55′44″N 87°54′02″W	Mount Vernon	
7	Frederick and Augusta Hagemann Farm	Frederick and Augusta Hagemann Farm	March 18, 1993 (#93000180)	Southwestern corner of the junction of State Roads 62 and 69, west of Mount Vernon; 37°55′35″N 87°54′37″W	Black Township	
8	Harmony Way Bridge	Harmony Way Bridge	October 3, 2007 (#07001030)	Indiana State Road 66/Illinois Route 14; 38°07′52″N 87°56′32″W	New Harmony	Extends into White County, Illinois
9	Hovey Lake Archaeological District	Hovey Lake Archaeological District	September 12, 1985 (#85002130)	Address Restricted	Point Township	
10	Mann site	Mann site	October 1, 1974 (#74000018)	Off Indian Mound Rd., southeast of Mount Vernon; 37°54′44″N 87°50′20″W	Black Township	A Hopewell site featuring village areas, geometrical earthworks and mounds.
11	Mount Vernon Downtown Historic District	Mount Vernon Downtown Historic District	June 22, 2003 (#03000545)	Roughly bounded by the Ohio River, 6th and Walnut Sts., and College Ave. 37°55′51″N 87°53′46″W	Mount Vernon	
12	Mount Vernon Site	Mount Vernon Site	January 11, 1996 (#95001542)	Atop a ridgeline about 100 metres (330 ft) south of County Road 850S, near the entrance to the Mount Vernon General Electric plant and southwest of Mount Vernon; 37°54′48″N 87°56′23″W	Black Township	One of the largest known Hopewell mounds. Damaged and looted during discovery in 1988. Also known as the GE Mound.
13	Murphy Archeological Site	Murphy Archeological Site	May 12, 1975 (#75000012)	Northwestern side of Pitcher Lake, approximately 1 mile (1.6 km) east of the mouth of the Wabash River and southwest of Mount Vernon; 37°48′25″N 88°00′05″W	Point Township	
14	New Harmony Historic District	New Harmony Historic District	October 15, 1966 (#66000006)	Main St. between Granary and Church Sts.; also roughly bounded by 3rd, Steammill, Main, Arthur, and North Sts., including the Maple Hill Cemetery and the Atheneum; 38°07′48″N 87°56′08″W	Harmony Township and New Harmony	Second set of boundaries represents a boundary increase of May 3, 2000
15	Posey County Courthouse Square	Posey County Courthouse Square	January 4, 1989 (#88003042)	300 Main St. 37°55′55″N 87°53′41″W	Mount Vernon	
16	Mattias Scholle House	Mattias Scholle House	March 2, 1981 (#81000007)	Tavern and Brewery Sts. 38°07′45″N 87°55′59″W	New Harmony	
17	Amon Clarence Thomas House	Amon Clarence Thomas House	September 14, 1995 (#95001111)	503 West St. 38°07′46″N 87°56′13″W	New Harmony	
18	Welborn Historic District	Welborn Historic District	March 25, 1992 (#92000188)	Roughly bounded by 9th, Locust, and 2nd Sts., and the alley between Walnut and Main Sts. 37°56′03″N 87°53′38″W	Mount Vernon	

== Former listings ==
	Name on the Register	Image	Date listed	Date removed	Location	City or town	Description
1	I.O.O.F. and Barker Buildings	I.O.O.F. and Barker Buildings	September 12, 1985 (#85002133)	December 25, 2011	402-406 Main St. 37°55′56″N 87°53′44″W	Mount Vernon	
2	Pitcher House (Fullinwider House)		February 8, 1980 (#80000031)	September 14, 1989	530 College Ave. 37°55′59″N 87°53′50″W	Mount Vernon	Damaged by fire on September 2, 1983, and subsequently demolished the next month.

== See also ==
- List of National Historic Landmarks in Indiana
- National Register of Historic Places listings in Indiana
- Listings in neighboring counties: Gallatin (IL), Gibson, Henderson (KY), Union (KY), Vanderburgh, White (IL)
- List of Indiana state historical markers in Posey County
