= Ashworth Archaeological Site =

Archaeological site in Indiana, US

- Ashworth Archaeological Site (12 Po 7)
- U.S. National Register of Historic Places
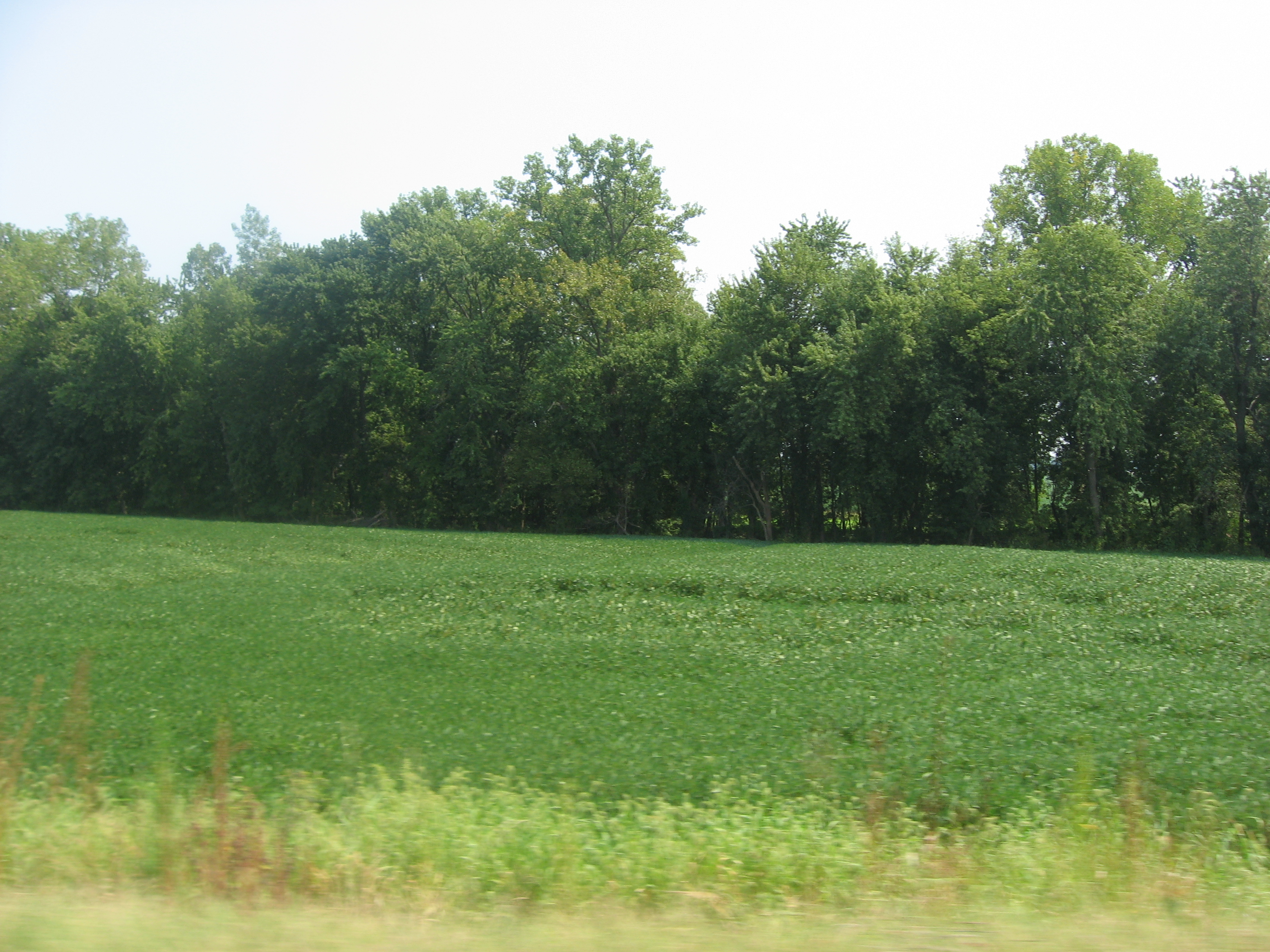
- Fields at the site

- Location within Indiana Location within the United States
- Location: Eastern side of State Road 69 in Point Township, Posey County, Indiana
- Coordinates: 37°51′0″N 87°56′10″W
- Area: 50 acres (20 ha)
- NRHP reference No.: 85002137
- Added to NRHP: September 12, 1985

The Ashworth Archaeological Site is a significant archaeological site in the extreme southwestern corner of the U.S. state of Indiana. Located near the confluence of the Ohio and Wabash Rivers, it lies near several similar archaeological sites. It was first examined by archaeologists in the middle of the twentieth century and found to be the site of a relatively recent Native American village, and it has been designated a historic site because of its archaeological value.

== Geography ==
The Ashworth Archaeological Site is located in the southern portion of Section 1, Township 8S, Range 14W, in the northeastern portion of Point Township, the southwesternmost township in Posey County, the southwesternmost county in Indiana. Another archaeological site, designated 12PO11, is located farther south in the same section; both sites are approximately 1 mile (1.6 km) north of the northern end of Hovey Lake and an equal distance west of a bend of the Ohio River. It lies in a field on the eastern side of State Road 69 atop a bluff overlooking a slough.

Due to its location at the southern extremity of the state, Posey County experiences fewer frost days than most of the rest of Indiana. This favorable weather, combined with its place as the first portion of Indiana to be reached by one ascending the Ohio River, caused the land within the boundaries of the modern county to have one of Indiana's heaviest concentrations of Pre-Columbian populations. An archaeological field survey published in 1949 found evidence of fifteen different prehistoric villages in Point Township, which has yielded artifacts as old as a Folsom point, and as recent as the Mississippian period.

== Excavation ==
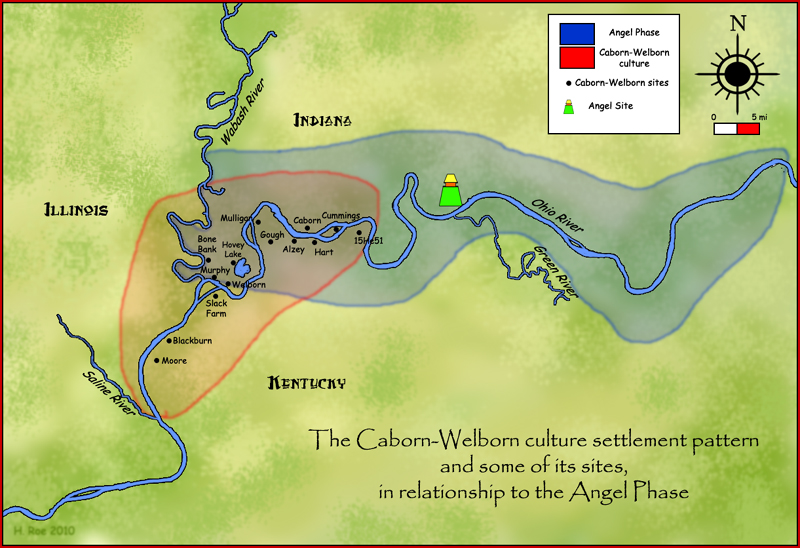
Caborn-Welborn sites close to Ashworth

In 1945, the state legislature voted a substantial appropriation to the Indiana Historical Bureau. As the Corps of Engineers was considering the construction of a massive levee along Posey County's Ohio River shoreline for flood control purposes, Indiana archaeologists feared the destruction of many riverside sites, and the Historical Bureau accordingly funded an extensive field survey that investigated the county from April to December of the following year. Follow-up surveys continued into 1947, and the results were published in 1949.

In early 1947, the surveyors visited northeastern Point Township and obtained permission to investigate a field that had a reputation of producing a wide range of archaeological material. Because the owner had just disked the field in preparation for planting corn, many artifacts had recently been brought to the surface and were readily apparent to the surveyors, such as lithic flakes, bits of human bone, and sherds of pottery. By intensively examining the surface of the field, the surveyors collected forty-three pottery sherds (including thirty-six that were shell-tempered), a projectile point, seven scrapers, four other stone tools, and a phalanx bone originating from a bovine species, either Bos taurus or Bison bison.

Having found this significant collection of artifacts, the surveyors sought and obtained the owner's permission to excavate any human burials they discovered. Having found a cluster of three skeletons during one day's research, they covered them as evening approached, planning to remove them and to continue their excavations on the following day. The three bodies were those of a child and two adults (one male and one female); they were found because the adult male's tibia and fibula had been unearthed when the owner had disked his field. They had been buried in a rectangular shallow grave dug into a slope; the bodies' heads pointed at a bearing of approximately 305°. Upon their return, the archaeologists learned that their excavations were completed: overnight, the owner's religious beliefs had led him to conclude that no more excavations should be permitted, so as soon as the surveyors had finished sketching the skeletons, they followed the owner's instructions by reburying them.

== Conclusions ==
Based on the evidence it uncovered, the 1940s survey concluded that Ashworth was the site of a prehistoric village. The artifacts found during this survey are useful for identifying the people who lived at Ashworth: shell-tempered pottery is a hallmark of the Mississippian culture, and the inhabitants are now believed to have been members of the Caborn-Welborn culture, a Mississippian subgroup. Very similar results were found at the nearby site 12PO11, the other former village site in Section 1; as a result of the sites' similar artifacts and the extremely small distance between them, 12PO11 was thought perhaps to be an outlying portion of Ashworth.

In 1985, approximately 50 acres (20 ha) of the Ashworth Archaeological Site was listed on the National Register of Historic Places because of its archaeological value. It is one of five Posey County archaeological sites on the Register and one of three in Point Township, along with an archaeological district near Hovey Lake and the major Murphy Site very close to the mouth of the Wabash.

== See also ==
- List of archaeological sites on the National Register of Historic Places in Indiana
- Slack Farm
