= Point Township =

Point Township may refer to the following townships in the United States:

- Point Township, Posey County, Indiana
- Point Township, Pennsylvania
