= List of Indiana state historical markers in Posey County =

Location of Posey County in Indiana

This is a list of the Indiana state historical markers in Posey County.

This is intended to be a complete list of the official state historical markers placed in Posey County, Indiana, United States by the Indiana Historical Bureau. The locations of the historical markers and their latitude and longitude coordinates are included below when available, along with their names, years of placement, and topics as recorded by the Historical Bureau. There are 5 historical markers located in Posey County.

== Historical markers ==
Marker title	Image	Year placed	Location	Topics
New Harmony		1966	Near 513 E. Church Street across from the post office in New Harmony; 38°7′47″N 87°56′3″W	Historic District, Neighborhoods, and Towns
Alvin P. Hovey 1821-1891		1966	Eastern side of State Road 69 at 5500 Industrial Road by the entrance to Bellefontaine Cemetery north of Mount Vernon; 37°57′33″N 87°53′48″W	Military, Politics
New Harmony Workingmen's Institute		2001	Workingmen's Institute at 407 W. Tavern Street in front of the library in New Harmony; 38°7′44″N 87°56′11″W	Business, Industry, and Labor, Historic District, Neighborhoods, and Towns
Tri-State Tornado		2004	Southeastern corner of the junction of Main and First Streets in Griffin; 38°12′17″N 87°54′52″W	Nature and Natural Disasters, Historic District, Neighborhoods, and Towns
Griffin Oil Discovery		2006	Main and First Street, Griffin; 38°12′16.8″N 87°54′52″W	Business, Industry, and Labor, Historic District, Neighborhoods, and Towns

== See also ==
- List of Indiana state historical markers
- National Register of Historic Places listings in Posey County, Indiana
