= Moses Ashworth =

American Methodist minister (1783–1838)

Moses Ashworth (1783 – 1838) was an American Methodist minister known for being the first appointed preacher to have lived and died in Indiana. He was first ordained as a preacher in 1805 by bishop Francis Asbury, and was the organizer of the first Methodist circuit in the territory of Indiana. He died in 1838 and was buried near Prairie Chapel.

== Life ==
Moses Vernon Ashworth was born in 1783 in Culpeper, Virginia. He later moved with his parents to Tennessee. He married Eliza David-Kenkins in 1809 and they had at least eleven children.

== Ministerial work ==
Moses Ashworth began his ministry in the early 1800s along the Methodist frontier in the Ohio River region. In 1807 he was assigned to the newly formed Silver Creek Circuit, the first full Methodist circuit in the Indiana Territory, where he rebuilt Robertson Chapel and helped organize societies that formed the foundation of early Methodist work in the region. His year on this circuit concluded with a prominent camp meeting near Robertson Chapel, noted in early histories as one of the first major gatherings of its kind in Indiana.

Following 1807, Ashworth continued to receive appointments in the region. In 1808 he was transferred to the Holston District, and in 1809, after a three-month ministry in Holston, he married Eliza Davis-Jenkins (cousin of Jefferson Davis). His name no longer appears in Western Conference minutes after 1809. Johnson notes that, according to the rules laid out by Wesley and promoted by Asbury, Ashworth then became a "located preacher," formally severing his connection with the Western Conference. In 1817 he was appointed at Lebanon, Tennessee, appearing in the Tennessee Conference in 1817 and 1818; otherwise, from 1809 to 1829, he served locally in western Tennessee, balancing family responsibilities with his preaching. After later settling in Posey County, Indiana, in 1829, Ashworth continued to preach locally at congregations like Prairie, Farmer's, Greathouse and Black. After his death in 1838, his remains were buried in a cemetery close to the Prairie Chapel in Black Township.
