= Pitcher House =

Pitcher House may refer to:

- Pitcher House (Mount Vernon, Indiana)
- Pitcher-Goff House, Pawtucket, Rhode Island
