= Hovey Lake Archaeological District =

Historic district in Indiana, United States

- U.S. National Register of Historic Places
- U.S. Historic district
- Location within Indiana Location within the United States
- Nearest city: Mount Vernon, Indiana
- Area: 343 acres (139 ha)
- NRHP reference No.: 85002130
- Added to NRHP: September 12, 1985

The Hovey Lake Archaeological District is a historic district composed of multiple archaeological sites in the extreme southwestern corner of the U.S. state of Indiana.

In late 1985, an area of archaeological sites near Hovey Lake was designated a historic district and listed on the National Register of Historic Places because of its archaeological importance. It is one of many substantial archaeological locations in Point Township: a very cursory survey of the county in the 1940s found fifteen different villages in the township, most of them within 2 miles (3.2 km) of one or both rivers. Today, it is one of three National Register-listed archaeological locations in Point Township, along with the Ashworth Archaeological Site and the Murphy Site; as well, the township includes the Hovey Lake-Klein and Welborn Village sites, which were deemed eligible for the National Register but were not added purely because of objections by property owners.

== See also ==
- List of archaeological sites on the National Register of Historic Places in Indiana
