= Oak Grove, Posey County, Indiana =

Oak Grove
- Unincorporated community
- Location within Indiana Location within the United States
- Coordinates: 37°50′10″N 88°01′18″W
- Country: United States
- State: Indiana
- County: Posey
- Township: Point
- Elevation: 361 ft (110 m)
- Time zone: UTC-6 (Central (CST))
  - Summer (DST): UTC-5 (CDT)
- ZIP code: 47620
- Area codes: 812, 930
- GNIS feature ID: 440399

Oak Grove is an unincorporated community in Point Township, Posey County, in the U.S. state of Indiana.
