= Hovey, Indiana =

- Unincorporated community
- Location within Indiana Location within the United States
- Coordinates: 37°53′32″N 87°56′31″W
- Country: United States
- State: Indiana
- County: Posey
- Township: Point
- Elevation: 371 ft (113 m)
- Time zone: UTC-6 (Central (CST))
  - Summer (DST): UTC-5 (CDT)
- ZIP code: 47620
- Area codes: 812, 930
- GNIS feature ID: 436531

Hovey is an unincorporated community in Point Township, Posey County, in the U.S. state of Indiana.

== History ==
A post office was established at Hovey in 1881, and remained in operation until 1902. The community was named after a family of settlers.
