= Point Township, Posey County, Indiana =

Point Township Posey County
- Township
- Coordinates: 37°50′17″N 87°59′37″W
- Country: United States
- State: Indiana
- County: Posey

Government
  - Type: Indiana township

Area
  - Total: 55.06 sq mi (142.61 km^{2})
  - Land: 49.20 sq mi (127.42 km^{2})
  - Water: 5.9 sq mi (15.2 km^{2})
- Elevation: 371 ft (113 m)

Population (2020)
  - Total: 306
  - Density: 6.22/sq mi (2.40/km^{2})
- FIPS code: 18-60858
- GNIS feature ID: 453753

Point Township is one of ten townships in Posey County, Indiana. As of the 2020 census, its population was 306. The lowest, the southernmost, and the westernmost points in Indiana are all located along the township's boundaries.

Historical population
Census	Pop.	Note	%±
1890	1,086		—
1900	1,404		29.3%
1910	1,164		−17.1%
1920	937		−19.5%
1930	807		−13.9%
1940	823		2.0%
1950	571		−30.6%
1960	457		−20.0%
1970	415		−9.2%
1980	443		6.7%
1990	477		7.7%
2000	497		4.2%
2010	381		−23.3%
2020	306		−19.7%
Source: US Decennial Census

== History ==
Point Township was organized in 1822. The township was so named for the fact the southernmost point in the county and state is contained within its borders.

The Ashworth Archaeological Site, Hovey Lake Archaeological District, and Murphy Archeological Site are listed on the National Register of Historic Places.

== Adjacent Townships ==
- Indiana
  - Posey County
    - Black Township (North)
- Illinois
  - Gallatin County
    - New Haven Township (West)
  - White County
    - Emma Township (Northwest)
- Kentucky
  - Union County
    - Uniontown District

== Unincorporated Places ==
- Hovey
- Oak Grove

== Education ==
It is within the Metropolitan School District of Mt. Vernon, which operates Mount Vernon High School.

== Archaeology ==
Point Township is the location of many significant archaeological sites. Among the leading ones are Ashworth in the township's northeast, Bone Bank along the Wabash River in the west, and Murphy, Hovey Lake-Klein, and Welborn in the south central.
