= Upton, Indiana =

- Unincorporated community
- Location within Indiana Location within the United States
- Coordinates: 37°57′52″N 87°57′42″W
- Country: United States
- State: Indiana
- County: Posey
- Township: Black
- Elevation: 377 ft (115 m)
- Time zone: UTC-6 (Central (CST))
  - Summer (DST): UTC-5 (CDT)
- ZIP code: 47620
- Area codes: 812, 930
- GNIS feature ID: 445176

Upton is an unincorporated community in western Black Township, Posey County, in the U.S. state of Indiana. It is located about 5 miles northwest of the city of Mt. Vernon, the county seat of Posey County.

== History ==
A post office was established at Upton in 1878, and remained in operation until 1904. The community was named for a settler who lived near the train depot.

=== Train wreck of 1905 ===
Five persons were killed, including an engineer and eight others injured, in a head-on crash between two freight trains on the former L & N railroad just outside the settlement of Upton on July 15, 1905. According to reports, a train dispatcher mistook the number of each train and after realizing that an error was made, contacted the operator via telephone in Upton to warn of the mistake. A hastily summoned group attempted to flag each train; unfortunately before they could reach the tracks, the collision had already occurred.
