= Indiana State Road 269 =

State highway in Indiana, United States

State Road 269
- SR 269 highlighted in red

Route information
- Maintained by INDOT
- Length: 0.890 mi (1,432 m)

Major junctions
- West end: Harmonie State Park
- East end: SR 69

Location
- Country: United States
- State: Indiana
- Counties: Posey

Highway system
- Indiana State Highway System; Interstate; US; State; Scenic
← SR 267	→ SR 301

State Road 269 (SR 269) is a part of the Indiana State Road that runs through rural Posey County in US state of Indiana. The 0.89 miles (1.43 km) of SR 269 that lie within Indiana serve as a mirror highway. None of the highway is listed on the National Highway System. The whole length is a rural two-lane highway. The highway passes through farmland and woodland properties.

== Route description ==
SR 269 begins at a rural intersection in Posey County at County Road 330 and Old Dam Road. The route heads southeast away from Harmonie State Park, as a two-lane highway, passing through farmland and woodland. The highway turns due east and heads towards SR 69. SR 269 ends at a 3-way intersection with SR 69.

No segment of SR 269 is included as a part of the National Highway System (NHS). The NHS is a network of highways that are identified as being most important for the economy, mobility and defense of the nation. The highway is maintained by the Indiana Department of Transportation (INDOT) like all other state road in the state. The department tracks the traffic volumes along all state highways as a part of its maintenance responsibilities using a metric called average annual daily traffic (AADT). This measurement is a calculation of the traffic level along a segment of roadway for any average day of the year. In 2010, INDOT figured that 100 vehicles and 10 commercial vehicles AADT along the route.

== Major intersections ==
The entire route is in Lynn Township, Posey County.

mi	km	Destinations	Notes
0.000	0.000	SR 69 – New Harmony, Mt. Vernon	Eastern terminus of SR 269
0.890	1.432	Harmonie State Park	Western terminus of SR 269
1.000 mi = 1.609 km; 1.000 km = 0.621 mi
