= Farmersville, Indiana =

- Unincorporated community
- Location within Indiana Location within the United States
- Coordinates: 37°58′49″N 87°53′46″W
- Country: United States
- State: Indiana
- County: Posey
- Township: Black
- Elevation: 423 ft (129 m)
- Time zone: UTC-6 (Central (CST))
  - Summer (DST): UTC-5 (CDT)
- ZIP code: 47620
- Area codes: 812, 930
- GNIS feature ID: 434406

Farmersville is an unincorporated community in Black Township, Posey County, in the U.S. state of Indiana.

== History ==
Farmersville was originally called Yankee Settlement or Yankeetown, and under one of the latter names was settled around the year 1812. The community was originally built up chiefly by New Englanders. A post office was established under the name Farmersville in 1850, and remained in operation until 1902.
