= Grafton, Indiana =

- Unincorporated community
- Location within Indiana Location within the United States
- Coordinates: 38°00′05″N 87°57′15″W
- Country: United States
- State: Indiana
- County: Posey
- Township: Black
- Elevation: 364 ft (111 m)
- Time zone: UTC-6 (Central (CST))
  - Summer (DST): UTC-5 (CDT)
- ZIP code: 47620
- Area codes: 812, 930
- GNIS feature ID: 435276

Grafton is an unincorporated community in Black Township, Posey County, in the U.S. state of Indiana.

== History ==
Grafton was laid out in 1852 near the site of a gristmill on Big Creek. The community was named after Grafton, Illinois. The Grafton post office closed in 1902.
