= New Harmony Historic District =

Historic district in Indiana, United States

- U.S. National Register of Historic Places
- U.S. National Historic Landmark District
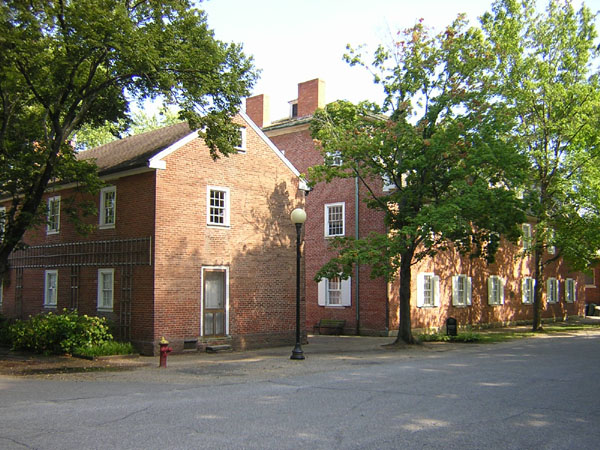
- Harmony Society buildings in New Harmony Historic District, Indiana

- Location within Indiana Location within the United States
- Location: Main St. between Granary and Church Sts., New Harmony, Indiana
- Coordinates: 38°7′48″N 87°56′8″W
- Built: 1815
- Architectural style: Greek Revival, Gothic
- NRHP reference No.: 66000006 (original); 00000669 (increase)

Significant dates
- Added to NRHP: October 15, 1966
- Boundary increase: May 3, 2000
- Designated NHLD: July 23, 1965

The New Harmony Historic District is a National Historic Landmark District in New Harmony, Indiana. It received its landmark designation in 1965, and was placed on the National Register of Historic Places in 1966, with a boundary increase in 2000. The district includes properties within the Historic New Harmony State Historic Site. Twelve buildings from the early 19th century and twenty from the mid-19th century are within the district. The original boundary was Main Street between Granary and Church Streets and was later increased to include the area bounded by North and Steam Mill Streets and between Third and Arthur Streets.

The district was nominated for the National Register under the themes of social and humanitarian movement, with areas of significance including architecture, social history, and science. Its period of significance, 1814 to 1867, covers the Harmonist and Owen/Maclure eras in New Harmony's history. Individuals and groups who have made significant contributions to the town's utopian communities and have ties to the structures within the district include the Harmony Society, George Rapp, Robert Owen, Robert Dale Owen, David Dale Owen, Thomas Say, Charles-Alexandre Lesueur, William Maclure, Joseph Neef, and Marie Duclos Fretageot, among others.

== District history ==
The State of Indiana created the first New Harmony Memorial Commission in 1937 to help preserve and protect the community's history. Following the restoration of several historic properties, the state interpreted the site as the New Harmony State Memorial, which was later renamed the New Harmony State Historic Site. In 1965 a study completed by the National Survey of Historic Sites and Buildings identified New Harmony as a place of national significance. That same year, New Harmony was designated a National Historic Landmark district by the U.S. Department of the Interior.

A second New Harmony Memorial Commission, established in 1973, assisted with further preservation and development efforts. Between 1974 and 1980, Historic New Harmony, Inc., a private, nonprofit organization with grant funding from The Lilly Endowment, Inc., acquired and restored additional properties of historical significance. In 1977 National Park Service historian Joseph Mendinghall prepared a nomination for 19 properties with ties to the Harmonist/Owenite era, 1814 to 1867. These properties, spread throughout the community, were listed in the National Register of Historic Places on November 12, 1977; however, additional resources, including the original grid plan of the town and the site of the original Harmonist churches were not included in the nomination.

In 1985 the University of Southern Indiana partnered with Historic New Harmony to preserve and maintain the town's historic structures and to offer educational and cultural programs. In 1991 Historic New Harmony combined its resources with the state-owned New Harmony State Historic Site to establish a "unified program" of the University of Southern Indiana and the Indiana State Museum and Historic Sites. The state's New Harmony Memorial Commission oversees the efforts of the two groups.

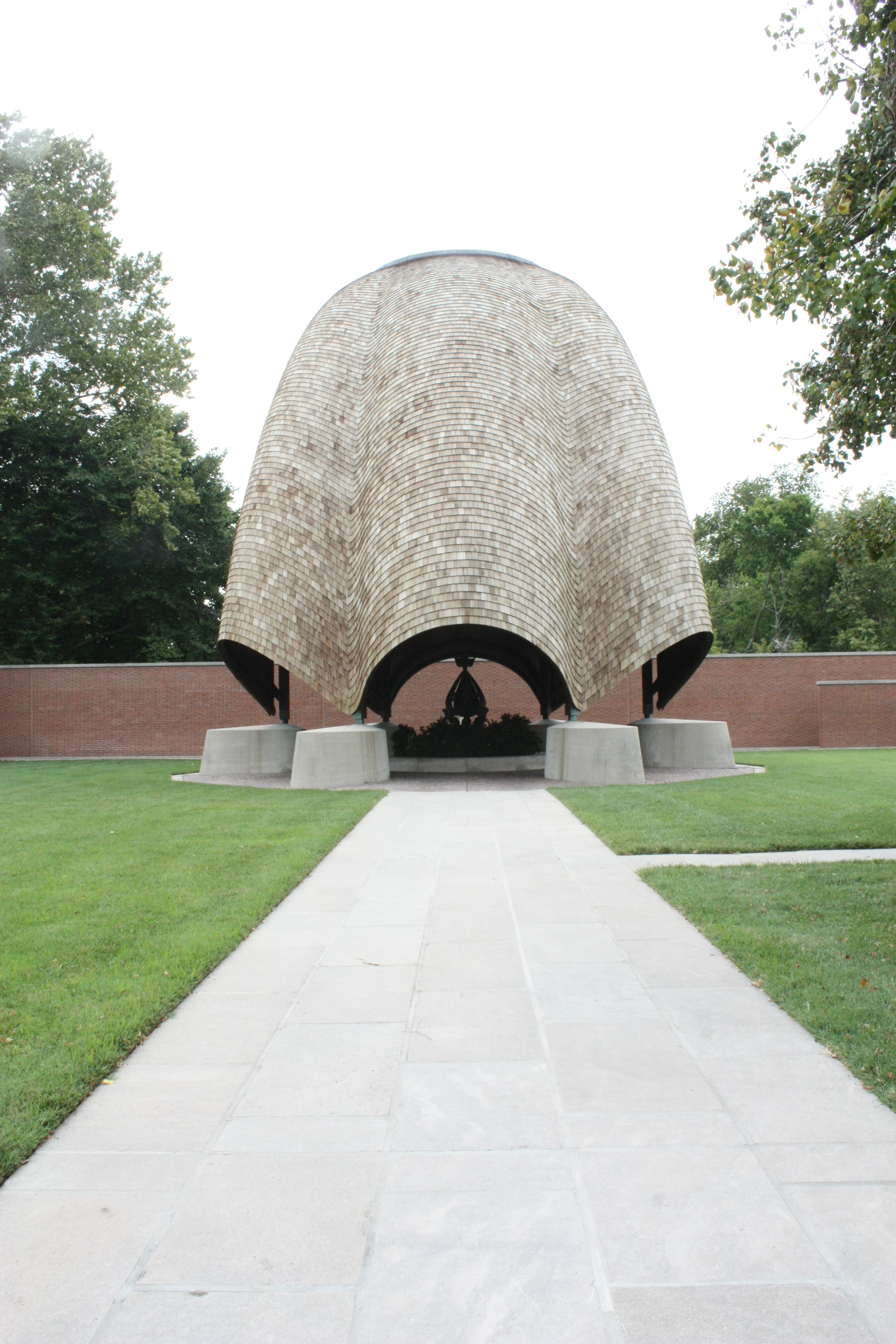
Philip Johnson's Roofless Church

A National Register of Historic Places nomination with an expanded boundary for the New Harmony Historic District was published on May 3, 2000. The boundary increase included resources dating from 1825 to 1867, the period when New Harmony was purchased by Robert Owen until the Owenite influence on the town waned after the American Civil War. As of May 2012, the Indiana State Museum and Historic Sites operates and preserves several properties within the New Harmony Historic District: Community House Number 2, Thrall's Opera House, Fauntleroy House, Harmonist Cemetery, Harmonist Labyrinth, and Mattias Scholle House. Other sites within the district include Philip Johnson's Roofless Church; New Harmony's Atheneum, an award-winning contemporary design by Richard Meier, completed in 1979, that serves as the visitors center for touring the historic district; and Maple Hill Cemetery.

== Buildings and sites ==
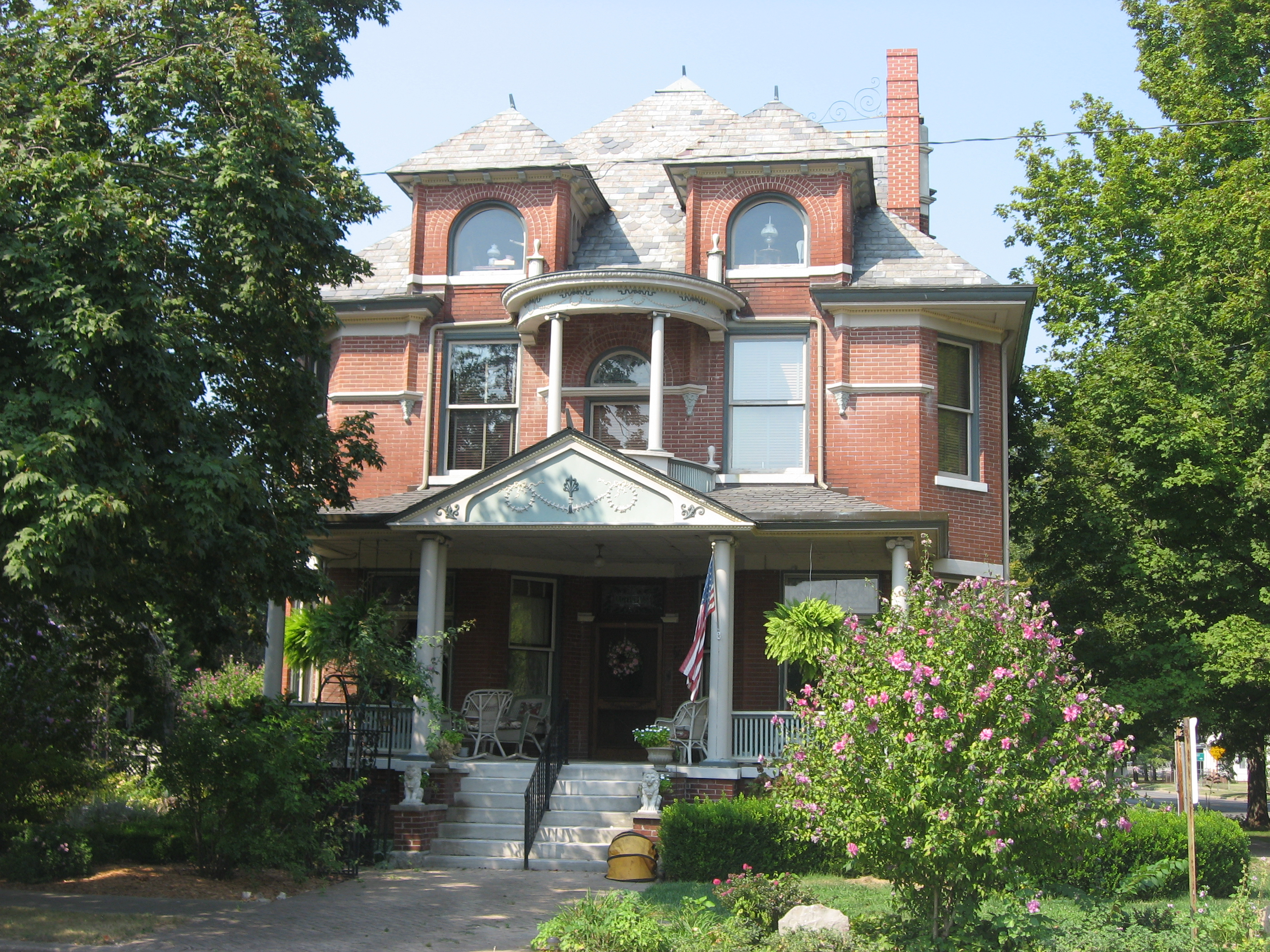
Amon Clarence Thomas House

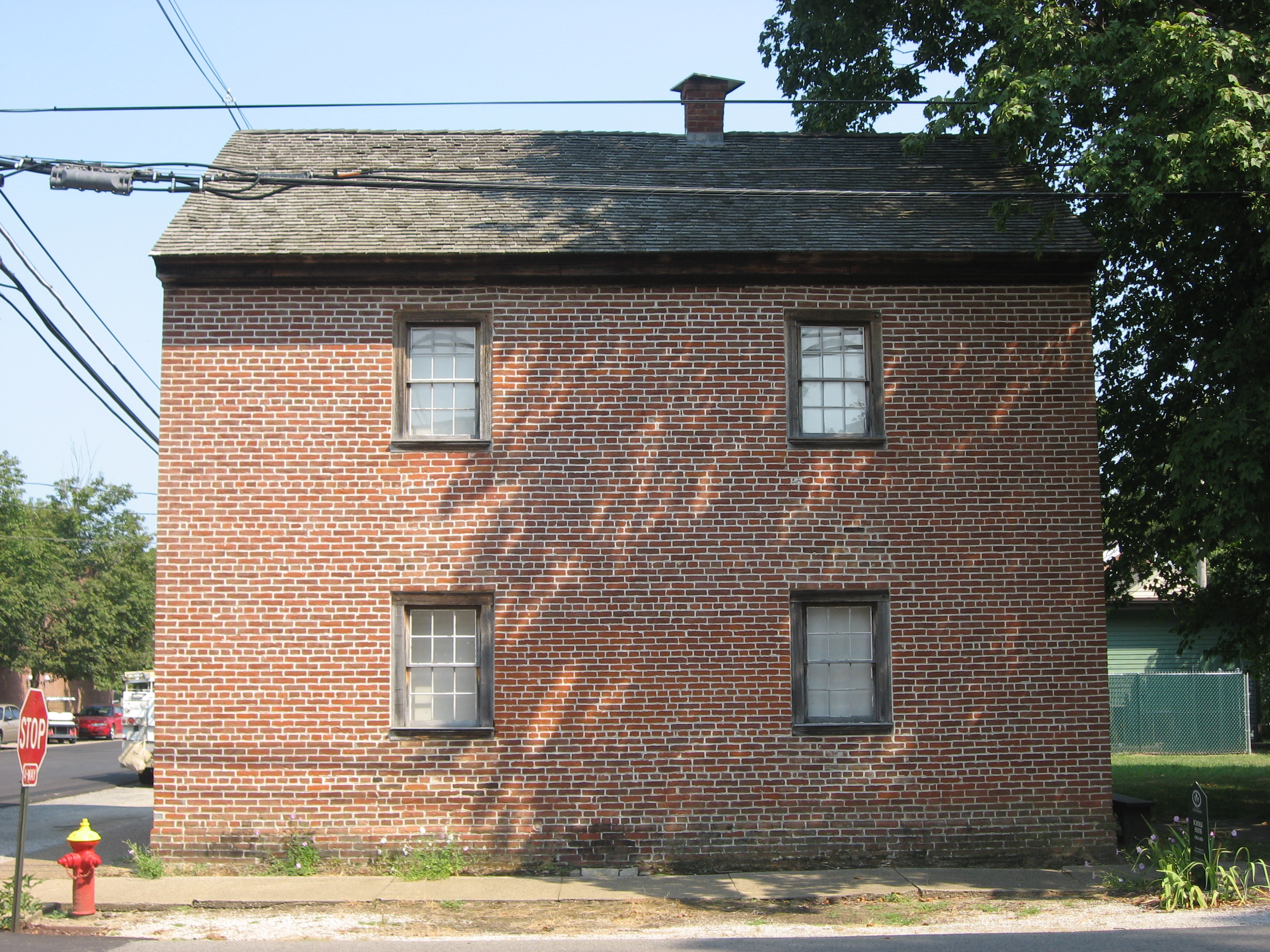
Mattias Scholle House

Twenty-five buildings and eight sites within the district were built by the Harmony Society between 1814 and 1824. Homes that are listed separately on the National Register include: Amon Clarence Thomas House, Mattias Scholle House, Ludwig Epple House, and George Bentel House. The National Historic Landmark nomination for the district's boundary increase identified 59 contributing and 99 noncontributing structures. The expanded district includes sixteen properties already designated as National Historic Landmarks, resources from previous NHL designations, and additional buildings, sites, and structures from the Rappite/Harmonist and Owenite communities.

The district includes reconstructed log cabins, a potter's shop, and barns representative of early Harmonist structures. The sites of early Harmonist churches, the Harmonist cemetery, and a cemetery wall built from brick used in the second Harmonist church are also part of the historic district. The cemetery, in keeping with Harmonist tradition of equality among all its members, has no gravestones within the cemetery wall. Native American mounds from the Middle Woodland Period more than two thousand years old are also found on the cemetery grounds. Church Park includes the sites of the first (1815 to 1822) and second (1822) Harmonist churches.

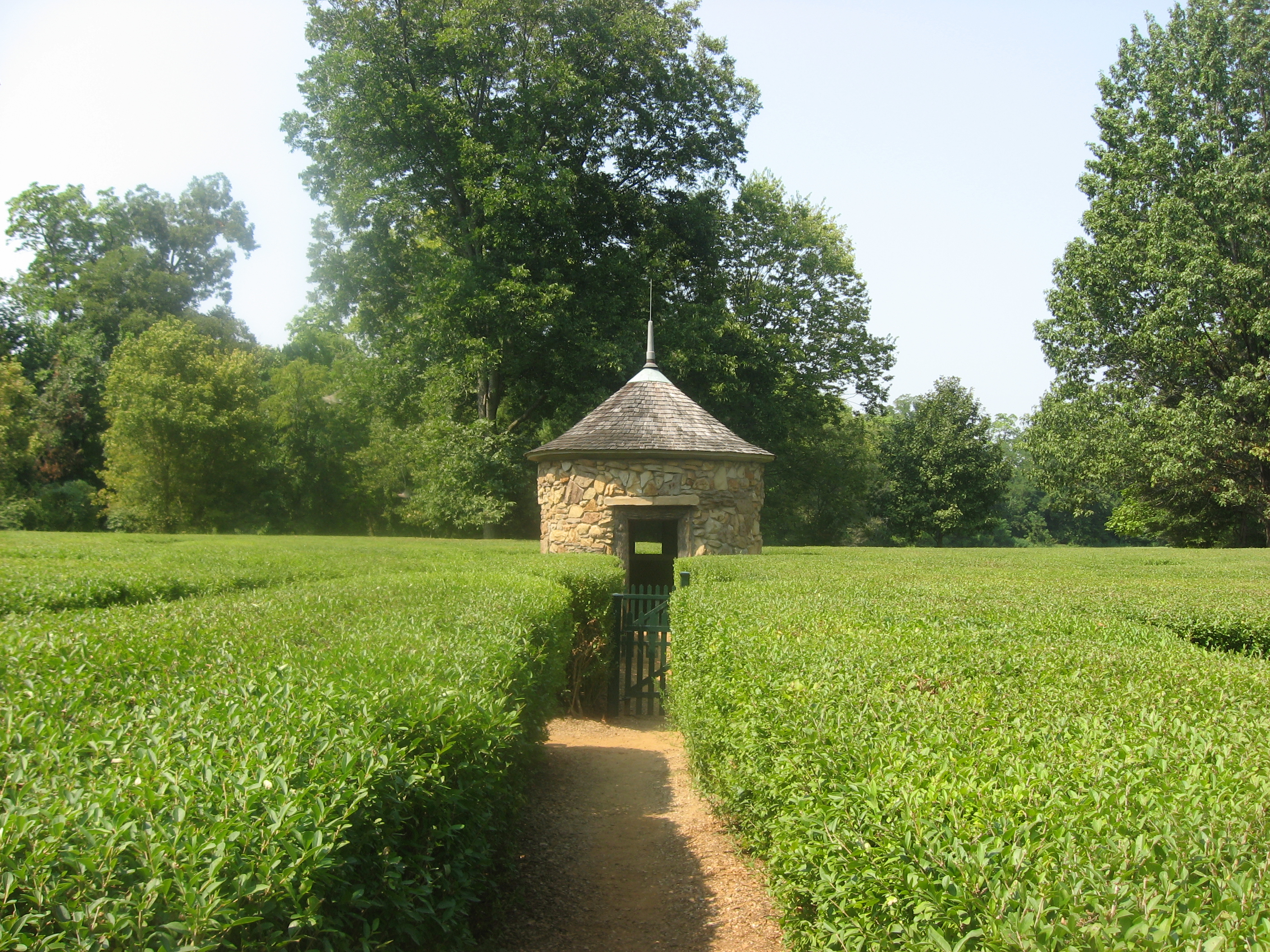
Harmonist Labyrinth

Thrall's Opera House

Other notable Harmonist sites and structures include the Rope Walk, part of the original 1,100-foot walk used to stretch, dry, and twist hemp into rope and the Harmonist Labyrinth, replanted and rebuilt in 1939 near its original site. Community House Number 2, a three-story, brick dormitory for single Harmonist members built in 1822, was later used by the Owen community for community activities, including a school. Thrall's Opera House/Community House Number 4, built in 1824, is a two-story Harmonist brick community house with Romanesque Revival alterations. Originally a Harmonist dormitory, the Owen community used it as a family dwelling, warehouse, and a place for public events. Renamed Union Hall in 1859, the building was used as a theater for a local acting company. After Eugene Thrall became its sole owner in 1888, the building was renamed Thrall's Opera House. In the early 20th century it was used as a nickelodeon movie house and later a gas station/garage before it was restored as a Victorian-era theater.

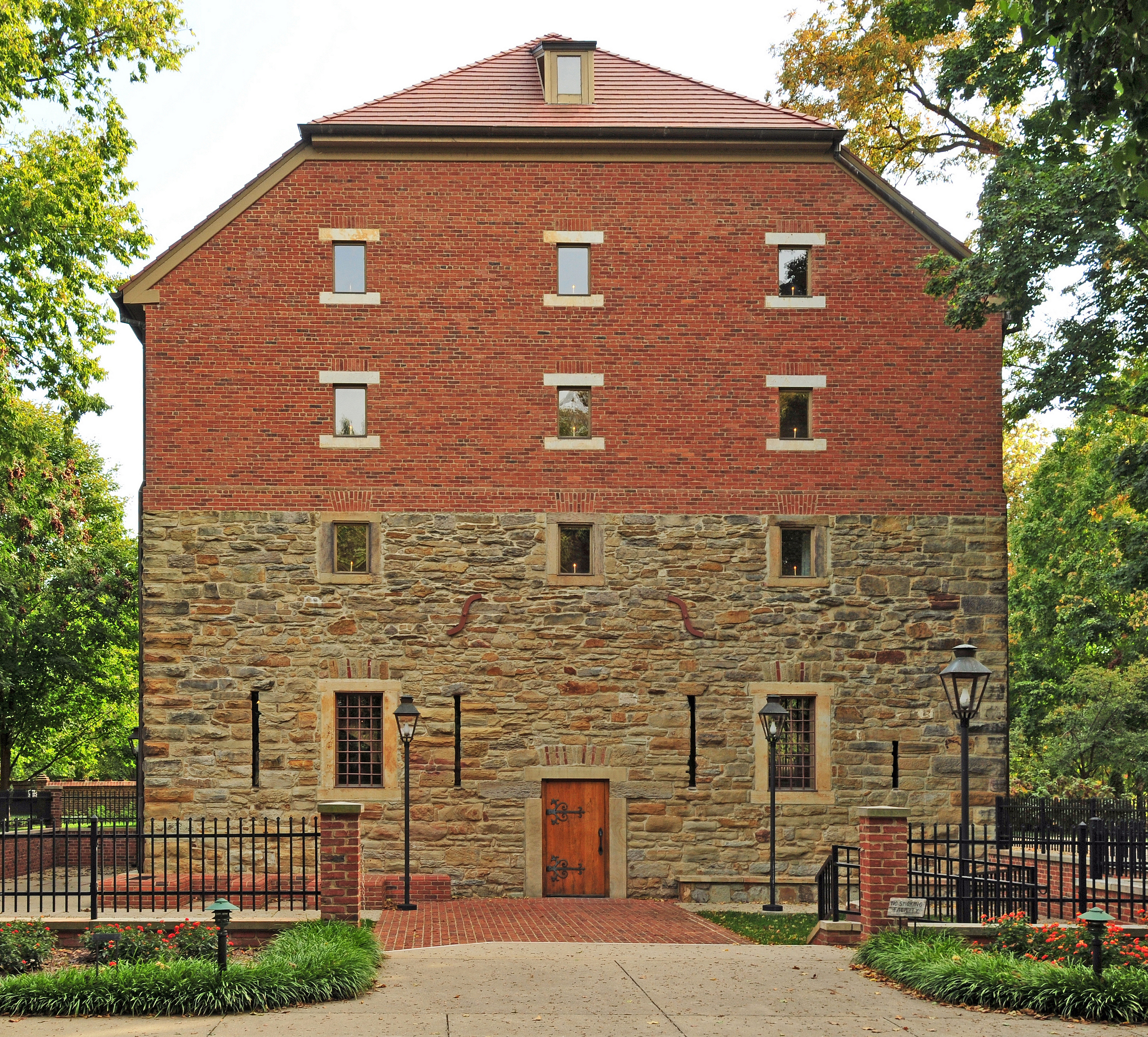
Restored Rapp-Owen Granary

The restored Rapp-Owen Granary, a five-story, brick, sandstone, and wood structure completed in 1818, is "the largest granary of its type built by German craftsmen in the United States" and "served as David Dale Owen's laboratory from 1843 to 1859." (Owen was appointed Indiana's first state geologist in 1837.) Operated as a wool mill and a cornmeal mill, the structure was reconverted to a granary and placed on the National Register in 1965. After a two-year restoration from 1997 to 1999, the granary serves as a museum and events facility.

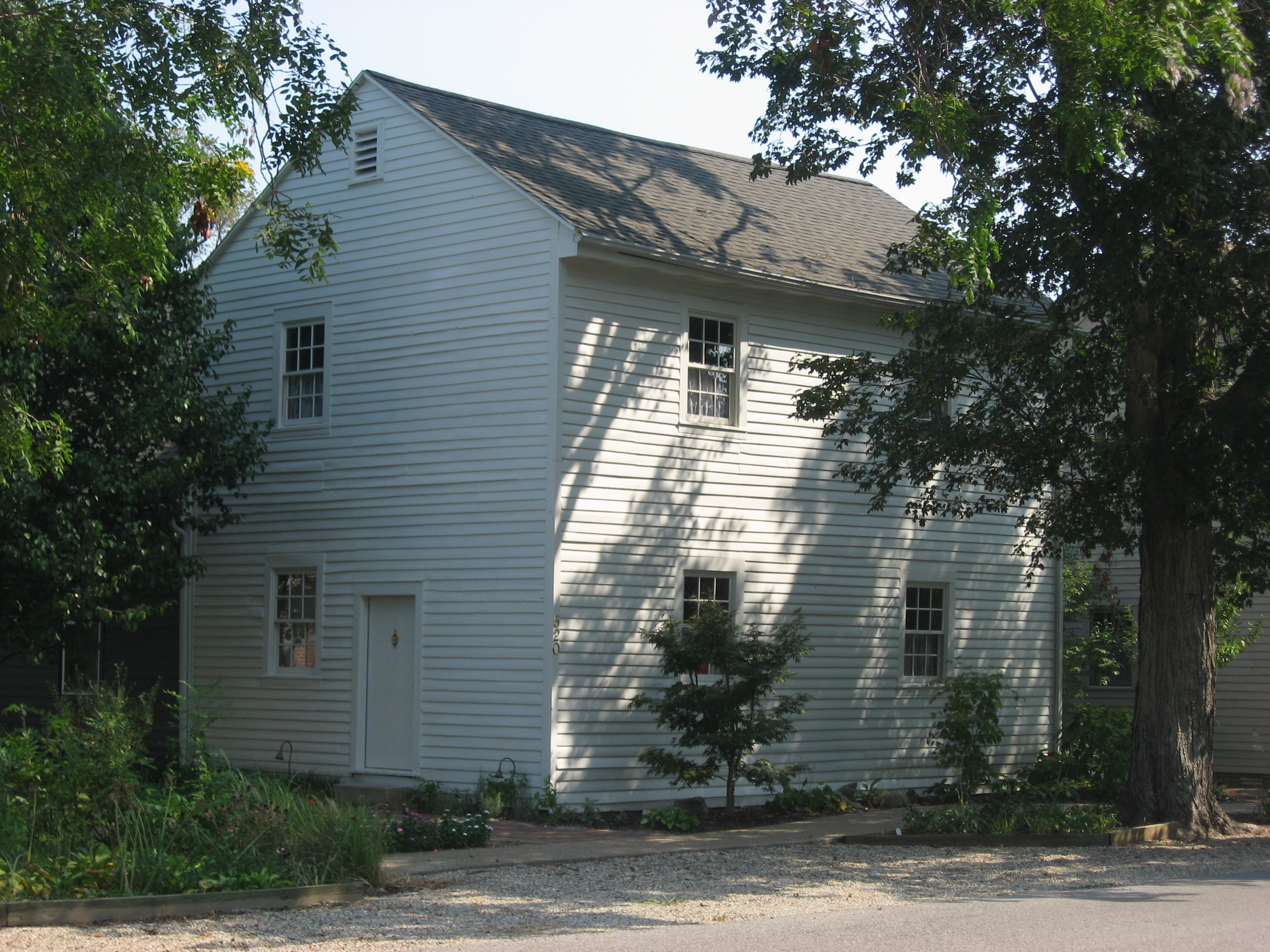
Ludwig Epple House

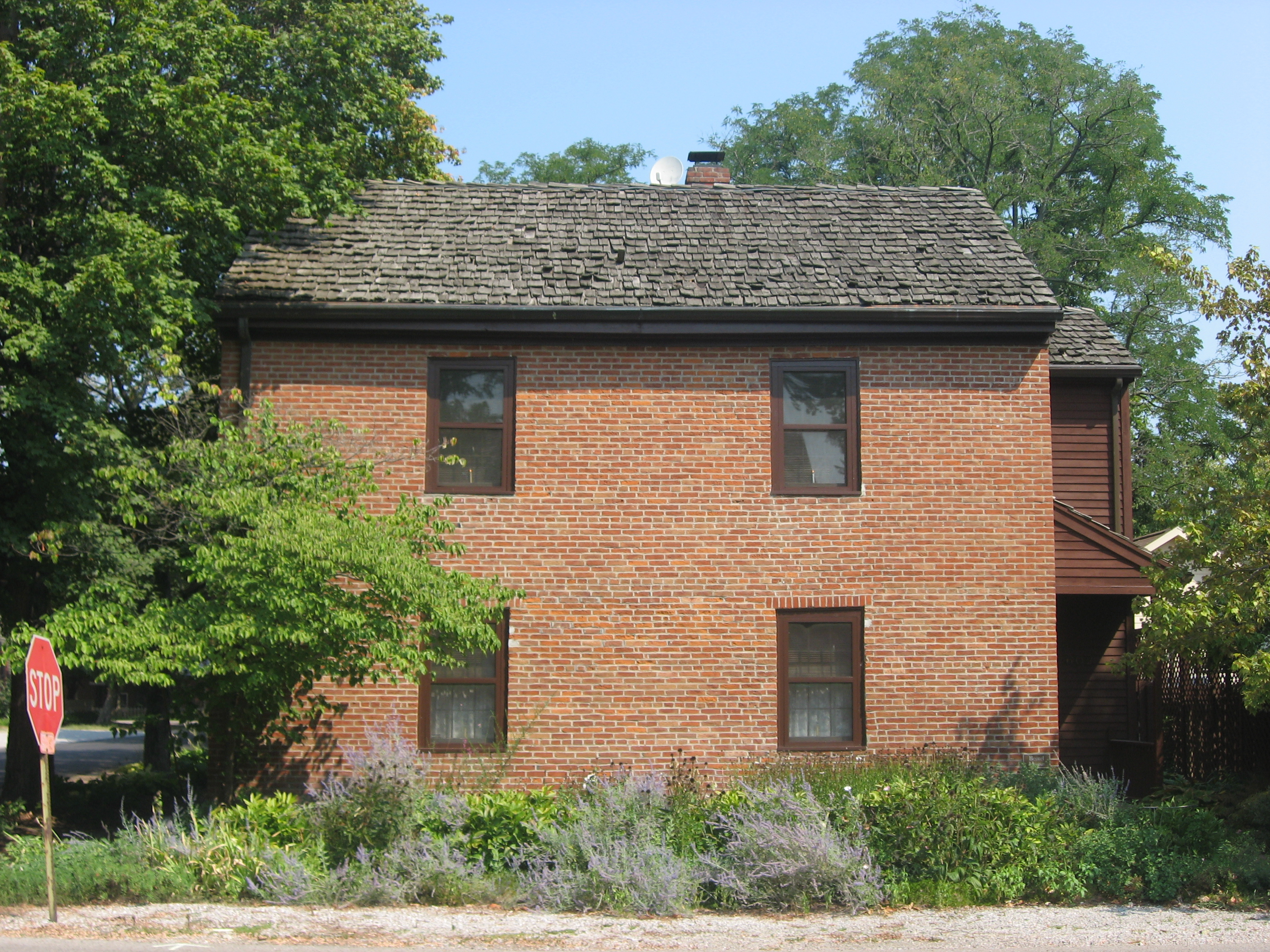
George Bentel House

The Harmonists also built timber-frame dwellings for its members. The David Lenz House, circa 1822, is a timber frame, two-story residence typical of the Harmonist period. Other Harmonist homes individually listed on the National Register include the Mattias Scholle House, a two-story, brick home of the town's shoemaker built in 1822; the Ludwig Epple House, a two-story frame home built in 1822; and the George Bentel House, another two-story example of brick construction, circa 1822. The Fauntleroy house, an 1822 two-story, frame Harmonist home modified in 1840, was the residence of the Franz Pfeil family, members of the Harmonist Society. Later residents include inventor Oliver Evans Jr. and the family of Robert Henry Fauntleroy and Jane Dale Owen Fauntleroy. The Fauntleroy's daughter, Constance, organized the Minerva Society, a women's literary club, in the home's parlor in 1859.

Structures built during the Owen period (1825 to 1867) generally reflect domestic architecture of the time. For example, the John Beal house, built circa 1829, reflects Federal/Greek Revival styles. The Owen House, known as "1830 House" and built by Robert Owen's sons, is a two-story, brick residence with a Federal style appearance. The Chadwick-Fretageot house is similar to the "1830 house." The David Dale Owen Laboratory is an 1849 Gothic Revival two-story brick laboratory, the Rapp-Maclure-Owen House, circa 1844, is a one-story, brick Greek Revival-style home, and the Schnee-Ribeyer-Elliott home is an 1867/1895 two and one-half story brick Greek Revival/Italianate home.

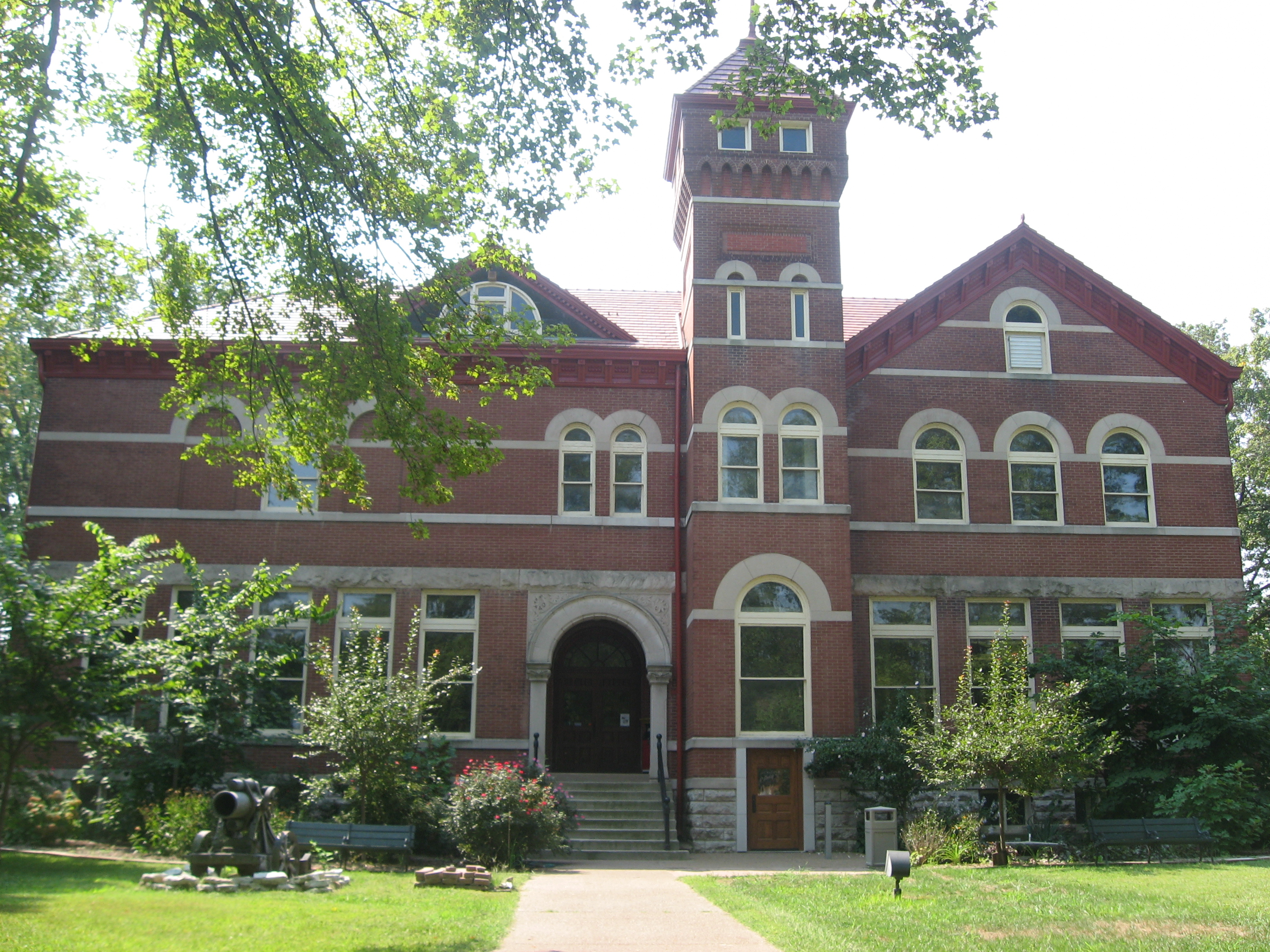
Workingmen's Institute

Two properties built outside the district's period of significance of 1814 to 1867 were grandfathered from the 1965 National Register designation because they relate to the continued work of the Workingman's Institute, founded by geologist and philanthropist William Maclure in 1838. These buildings include the Workingmen's Institute, a three-story, brick Romanesque Revival building constructed in 1894, and Murphy Auditorium, built in 1913, a three-story, brick Neoclassical auditorium. In addition to historically significant resources, the district includes over one hundred noncontributing buildings and sites constructed outside the Harmonist-Owenite period of significance.

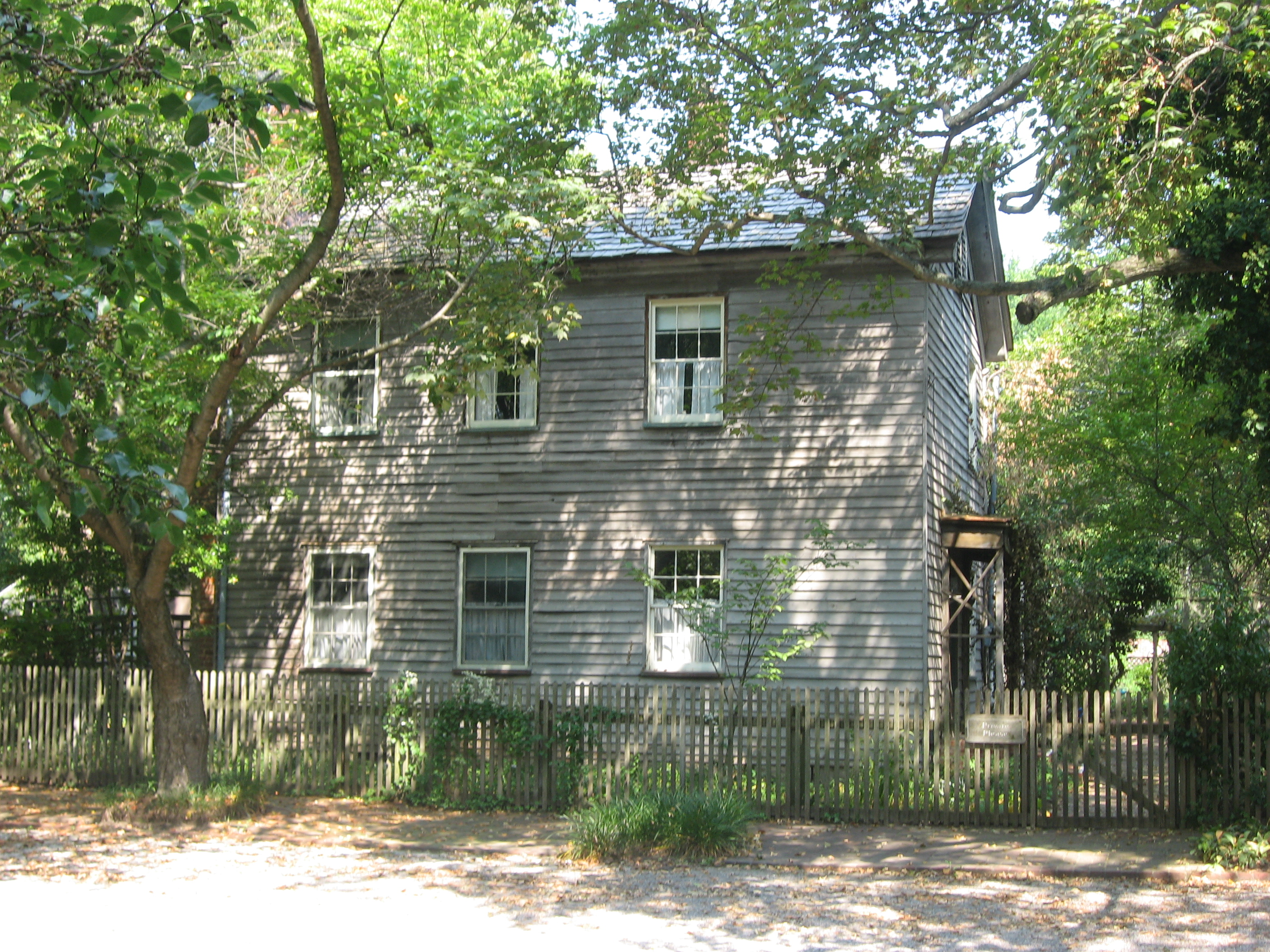
Rawlings Cottage built in 1815, part of the New Harmony Historic District.

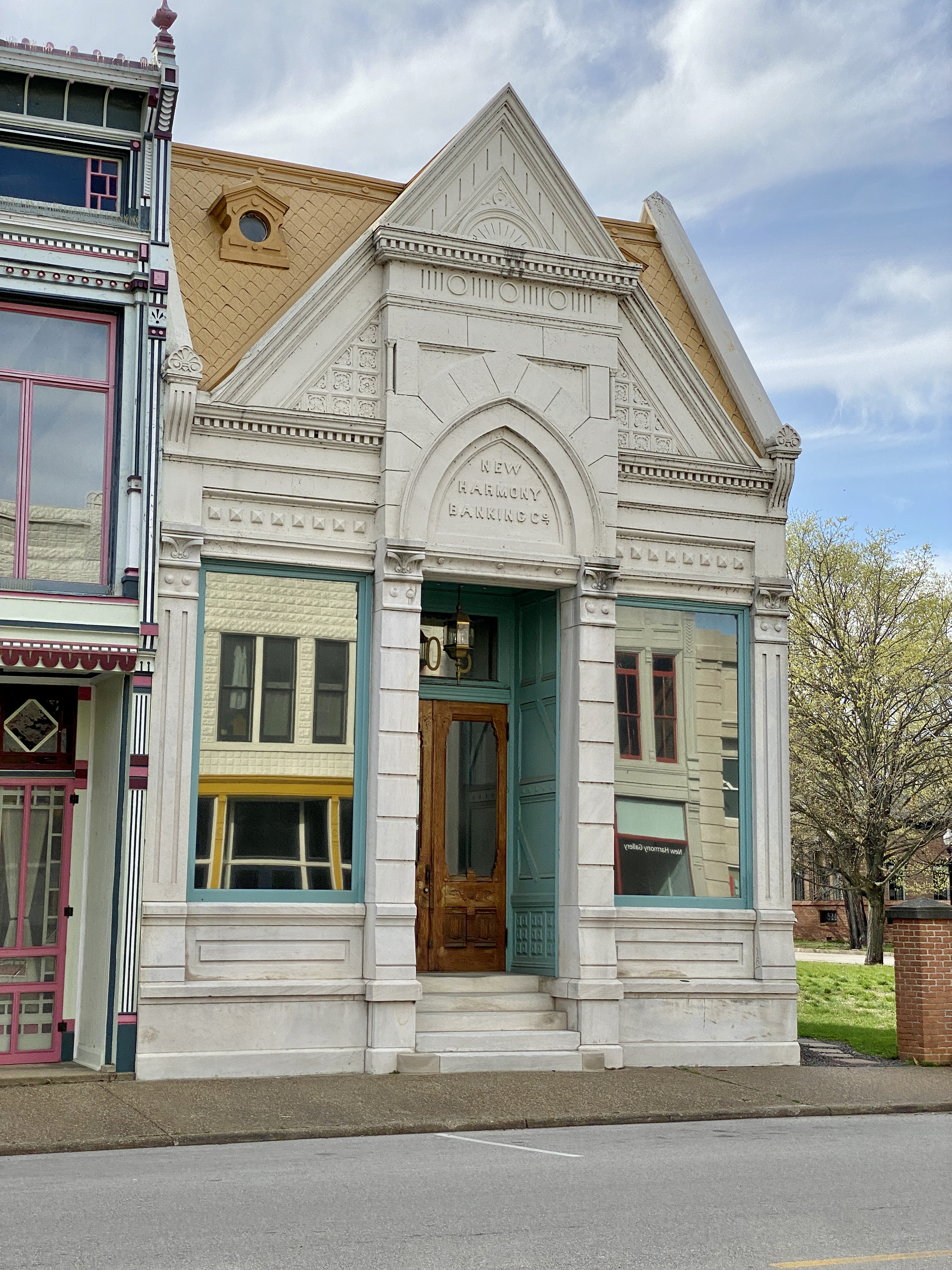
The New Harmony Banking Company, built in 1882.

== See also ==
- List of National Historic Landmarks in Indiana
- National Register of Historic Places listings in Posey County, Indiana
