= Indiana State Road 69 =

State highway in Indiana, United States

State Road 69
- SR 69 highlighted in red

Route information
- Maintained by INDOT
- Length: 35.604 mi (57.299 km)
- Existed: 1931–present

Major junctions
- South end: Hovey Lake Fish and Wildlife Area
- SR 62 at Mount Vernon; SR 66 near New Harmony
- North end: I-64 at Griffin

Location
- Country: United States
- State: Indiana
- Counties: Posey

Highway system
- Indiana State Highway System; Interstate; US; State; Scenic
← I-69	→ I-70

State Road 69 (SR 69) is a part of the Indiana State Road system that runs between Hovey Lake Fish and Wildlife Area and Griffin in US state of Indiana. The 35.07 miles (56.44 km) of SR 69 that lie within Indiana serve as a major conduit. Some of the highway is listed on the National Highway System. Various sections are urban two-lane highway, three-lane highway and rural two-lane highway. The highway passes through residential, industrial and commercial properties.

SR 69 was first designated as a state road in 1931. SR 69 replaced the original State Road 20 designation of the highway which dated back to the formation of the Indiana state road system. SR 20 ran from Mount Vernon to New Harmony. SR 69 also replaced the second designation of the highway, SR 65, from the Ohio River to New Harmony.

Despite its proximity to Interstate 69 being within neighboring Gibson and Vanderburgh Counties, the two routes have no relation to each other.

== Route description ==
SR 69 begins at the Hovey Lake Fish and Wildlife Area in southwestern Posey County, near the confluence of the Ohio River and the Wabash River. It proceeds roughly northeast as a rural two-lane on the banks of the Hovey Lake. The road turns due north, away from the lake, and towards Mount Vernon. The highway turn northwest passing around the southwest side of Mount Vernon, as a two-lane highway passing through farmland. The road turns east onto SR 62 and the two routes pass through downtown Mount Vernon. On the east side of downtown the road becomes a four-lane divided highway. Soon after SR 69 leaves the divided highway heading north. The route heads away from SR 62, as a four-lane undivided highway. The highway narrows to a two-lane highway and has a crossing with the Evansville Western Railroad track.

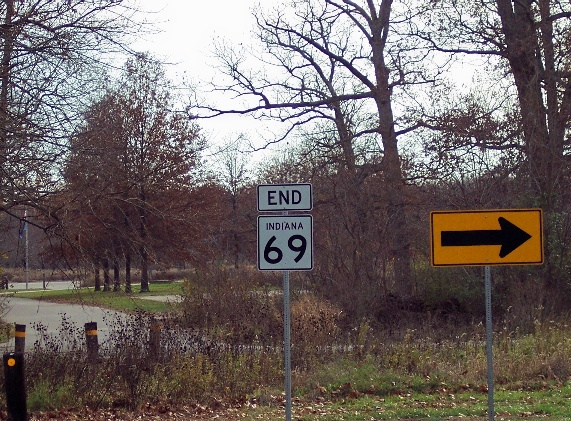
Southern terminus of State Road 69 at Hovey Lake Fish and Wildlife Area

After the track, the roadway turns due west and has a sharp turn back due north, north of Mount Vernon. The highway heads north-northwest towards New Harmony as a rural two-lane highway, passing through mainly farmland with some woodlands. The route passes east of the Harmonie State Park and bypasses New Harmony to the southeast. SR 69 begins a concurrency with SR 66, heading northeast. Soon after the concurrency begin it ends with SR 66 heading due east and SR 69 still heading northeast. At an intersection with the western terminus of SR 68, SR 69 heads due north, before turning northwest. The highway makes a sharp curve heading northeast towards Griffin where it terminates at Interstate 64 (I–64).

The only segment of SR 69 that is included as a part of the National Highway System (NHS), is between SR 62 and I–64. The NHS is a network of highways that are identified as being most important for the economy, mobility and defense of the nation. The highway is maintained by the Indiana Department of Transportation (INDOT) like all other state roads in the state. The department tracks the traffic volumes along all state highways as a part of its maintenance responsibilities using a metric called average annual daily traffic (AADT). This measurement is a calculation of the traffic level along a segment of roadway for any average day of the year. In 2010, INDOT figured that lowest traffic levels were the 260 vehicles and 20 commercial vehicles used the highway daily near the southern terminus. The peak traffic volumes were 16,500 vehicles and 2,240 commercial vehicles AADT along the section of SR 69 that is concurrent with SR 62.

== History ==
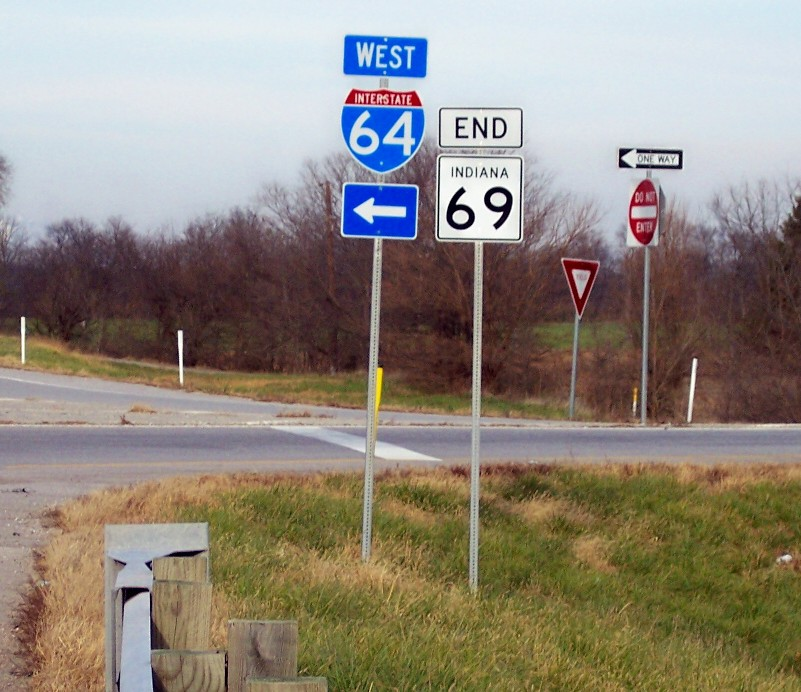
Northern terminus of State Road 69 at Interstate 64 near Griffin

By 1923 the route that SR 69 takes today was signed as SR 20 from Mount Vernon to New Harmony, the rest was county roads. In 1927, the whole segment of SR 20 was renumbered SR 65. The number was changed one last time, in 1931, this time to SR 69. In that year the route was extended south to the Ohio River, with a ferry across the river to Kentucky.

In the late 1990s, a number of relocations and widenings were made to the highway in order to increase its traffic capacity, including being rerouted onto the new William Keck Bypass around the eastern side of Mount Vernon. In 1999, a project extended Indiana 69 to Interstate 64 at the Griffin exit from its previous terminus at Indiana 66 in New Harmony. These improvements allowed coal trucks and other industrial vehicles to reach Mount Vernon and its Port of Indiana from Interstate 64 faster than the previous route.

== Major intersections ==
The entire route is in Posey County.

Location	mi	km	Destinations	Notes
Point Township	0.000	0.000	Hovey Lake Fish and Wildlife Area	Southern terminus of SR 69 at Hovey Lake Fish and Wildlife Area.
Mt. Vernon	8.239	13.259	SR 62 west	Western end of SR 62 concurrency
Mt. Vernon	13.515	21.750	SR 62 east – Evansville	Eastern end of SR 62 concurrency
Harmony Township	26.536	42.706	SR 269 west	Eastern terminus of SR 269; spur to Harmonie State Park.
Harmony Township	30.355	48.852	SR 66 east – Evansville	West end of SR 66
Harmony Township	31.096	50.044	SR 68 east – Poseyville	Western terminus of SR 68
Griffin	35.604	57.299	I-64 – Evansville, St. Louis	Northern terminus of SR 69
1.000 mi = 1.609 km; 1.000 km = 0.621 mi: Concurrency terminus

== See also ==
- Interstate 64 and Indiana 64 - another local pairing of both Interstate and State Road numbers.
