= James Elliott Farm =

Historic house in Indiana, United States

- U.S. National Register of Historic Places
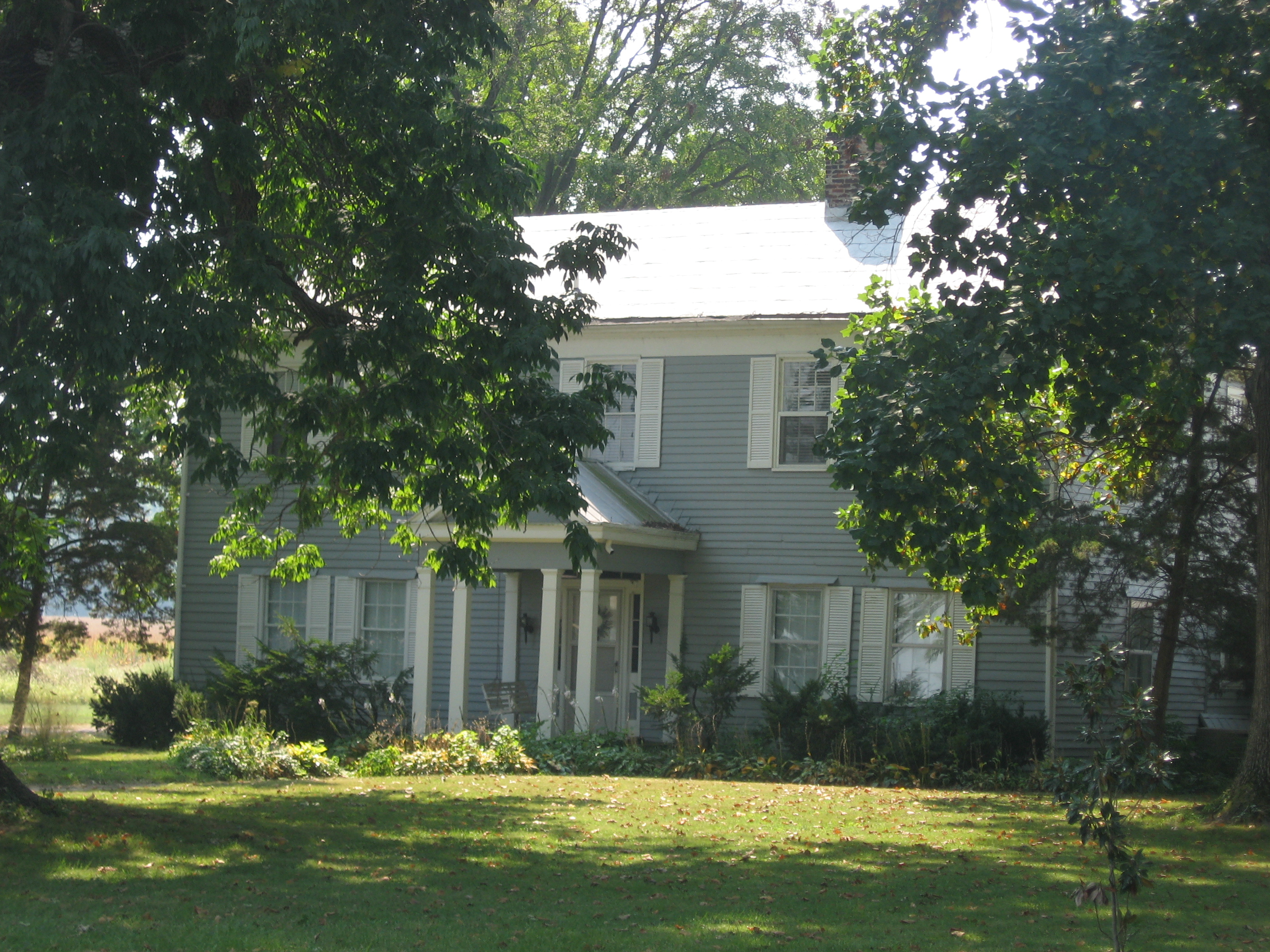
- Front of the farmhouse

- Location within Indiana Location within the United States
- Location: 1221 Church St. (State Road 66) at New Harmony, Indiana
- Coordinates: 38°7′44″N 87°55′23″W
- Area: 15 acres (6.1 ha)
- Architect: James Elliott
- Architectural style: Greek Revival
- NRHP reference No.: 03001312
- Added to NRHP: December 23, 2003

The James Elliott Farm is a historic farmstead located on the edge of the town of New Harmony, Indiana. The farm is composed of the farmhouse and seven outbuildings, including corn cribs, a barn, a shed, a silo, and a milkhouse. The farm centers around the farmhouse, which was built in the Greek Revival style in 1826 by English immigrant James Elliott; even before Elliott joined the commune, the property had been associated with the followers of Robert Owen; the land had previously supported an offshoot of the main community, which its residents called "Feiba Peveli." Elliott had settled in the vicinity as part of the Owenist commune that lived at New Harmony at that time; besides farming, Elliott established himself as the community's brewer.

Among the distinctive architectural elements of the farmhouse are its two large chimneys, its symmetrical five-bay facade, and a porch with a gabled Greek Revival pediment. The front door sits at the middle of the first-floor facade, with two windows on each side; the second floor facade is similar, except that a window occupies the place of the front door.

Although the Elliott Farm dates back nearly two hundred years, not all of its elements are original; one of the outbuildings was completed in 1938. Later in the twentieth century, the owners — still members of the Elliott family — took sustained action to restore and maintain the farm; this was one of many projects that they undertook at the time to preserve the buildings dating back to the time of the Harmony Society. In connection with their preservation efforts, the family succeeded in having the property listed on the National Register of Historic Places in 2003, due in part to the property's importance in the fields of architecture and agriculture. Six New Harmony properties are listed on the National Register, along with many buildings that have been grouped together as the New Harmony Historic District and named a National Historic Landmark; of the six, only the Harmony Way Bridge and the Elliott Farm are not part of the historic district.
