= Welborn Village Archeological Site =

Archaeological site in Indiana, United States

Welborn Village Archeological Site (12 Po 19)
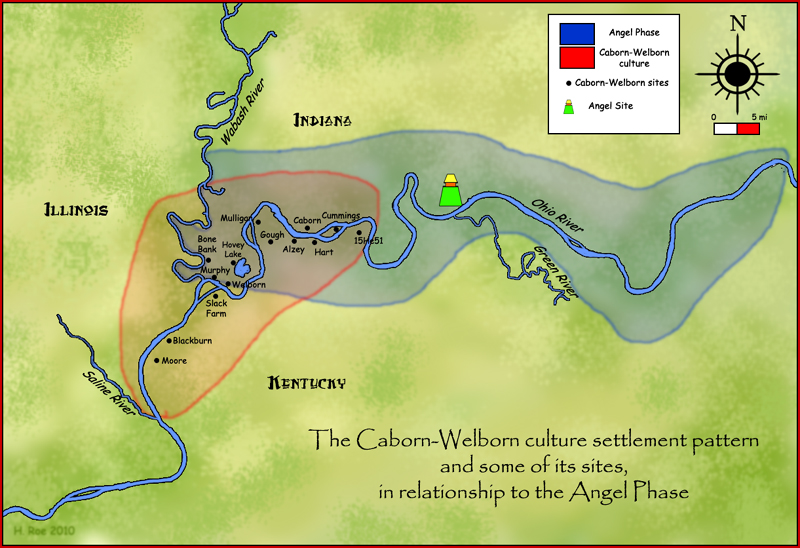
- Caborn-Welborn culture and some of its larger sites.

- Location within Indiana today
- 37°47′41″N 87°59′20″W
- Cultures: Caborn-Welborn culture
- Location: Uniontown, Kentucky, Posey County, Indiana, US
- Region: Posey County, Indiana

Welborn Village Archeological Site (12 Po 19), also known as the Murphy's Landings site, is an archaeological site of the prehistoric Caborn-Welborn culture variant of the Mississippian culture of indigenous peoples of North America.

Welborn Village Archeological Site is located on Hovey Lake, a backwater lake near the Ohio River close to its confluence with the Wabash River.

== See also ==
- Slack Farm
- List of Mississippian sites
