= George Bentel House =

Historic house in Indiana, United States

- U.S. National Register of Historic Places
- U.S. Historic district – Contributing property
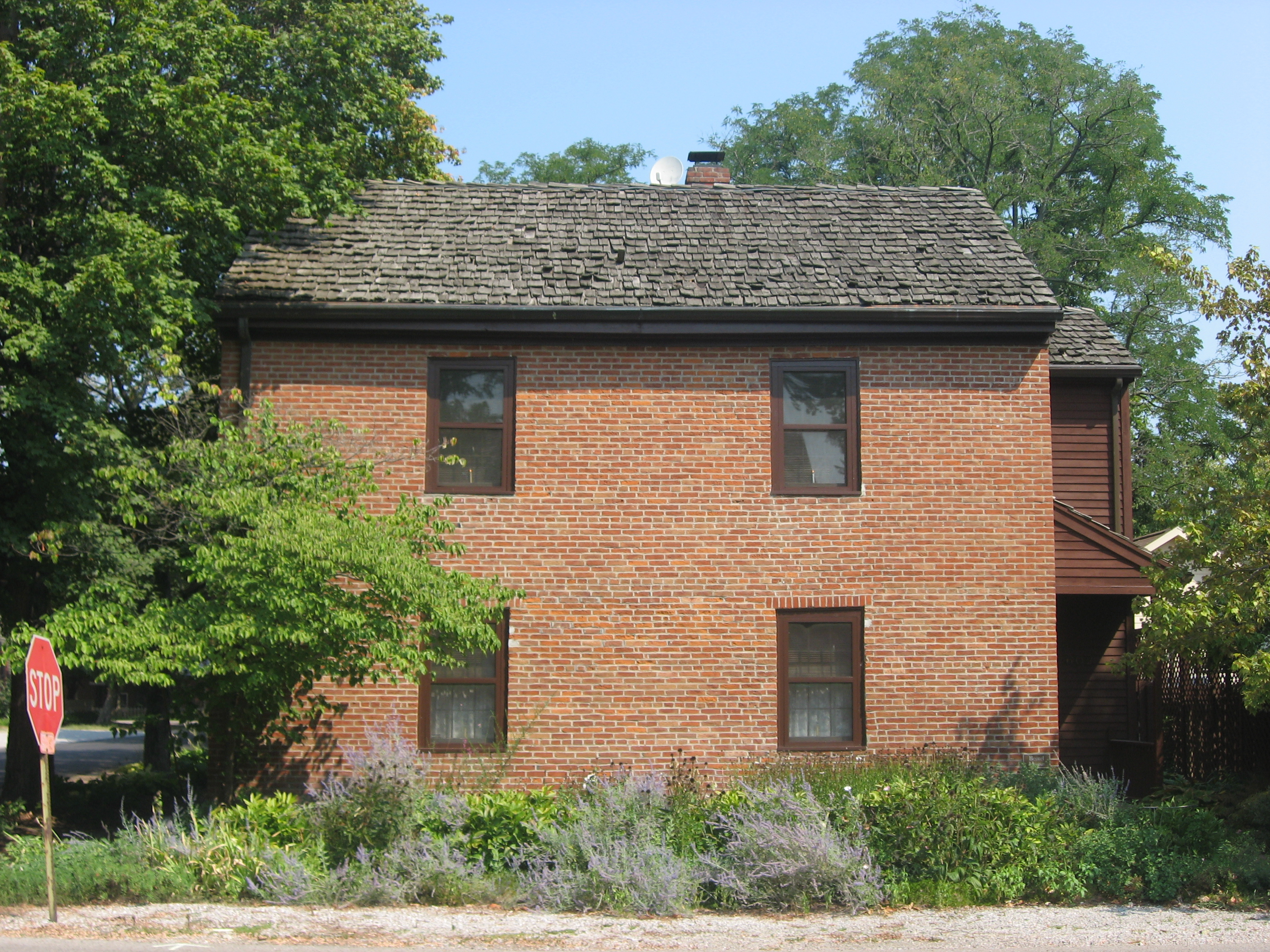
- George Bentel House, September 2011

- Location within Indiana Location within the United States
- Location: Brewery and Granary St., New Harmony, Indiana
- Coordinates: 38°7′50″N 87°55′53″W
- Area: less than one acre
- Built: 1823
- Built by: Rappites
- Architectural style: Harmonist
- NRHP reference No.: 84001224
- Added to NRHP: September 20, 1984

George Bentel House is a historic home located at New Harmony, Indiana, United States. It was built about 1823, and is a two-story, Harmonist brick dwelling. It has a wood shake gable roof. It is an example of the standardized, mass-produced form of Rappite built dwellings.

It was listed on the National Register of Historic Places in 1984. It is located in the New Harmony Historic District.
