= Mattias Scholle House =

Historic house in Indiana, United States

- U.S. National Register of Historic Places
- U.S. Historic district – Contributing property
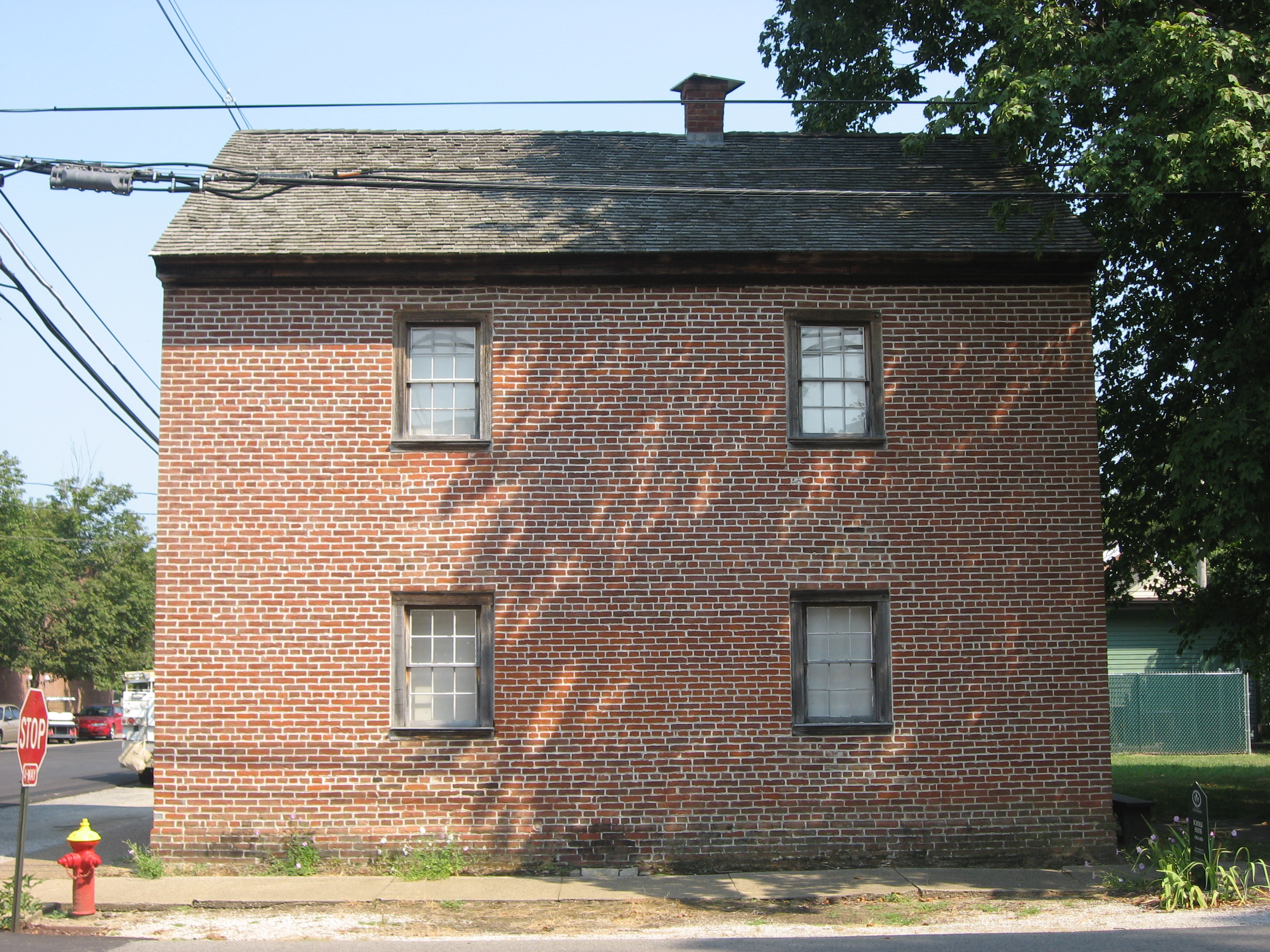
- Mattias Scholle House, September 2011

- Location within Indiana Location within the United States
- Location: Tavern and Brewery Sts., New Harmony, Indiana
- Coordinates: 38°7′45″N 87°55′59″W
- Area: less than one acre
- Built: c. 1823
- Architectural style: Harmonist
- NRHP reference No.: 81000007
- Added to NRHP: March 2, 1981

Mattias Scholle House is a historic home located at New Harmony, Indiana. It was built about 1823, and is a two-story, Harmonist brick dwelling. It has a gable roof. It is an example of the standardized, mass-produced form of Rappite built dwellings.

It was listed on the National Register of Historic Places in 1981. It is located in the New Harmony Historic District.
