= Frederick and Augusta Hagemann Farm =

- U.S. National Register of Historic Places
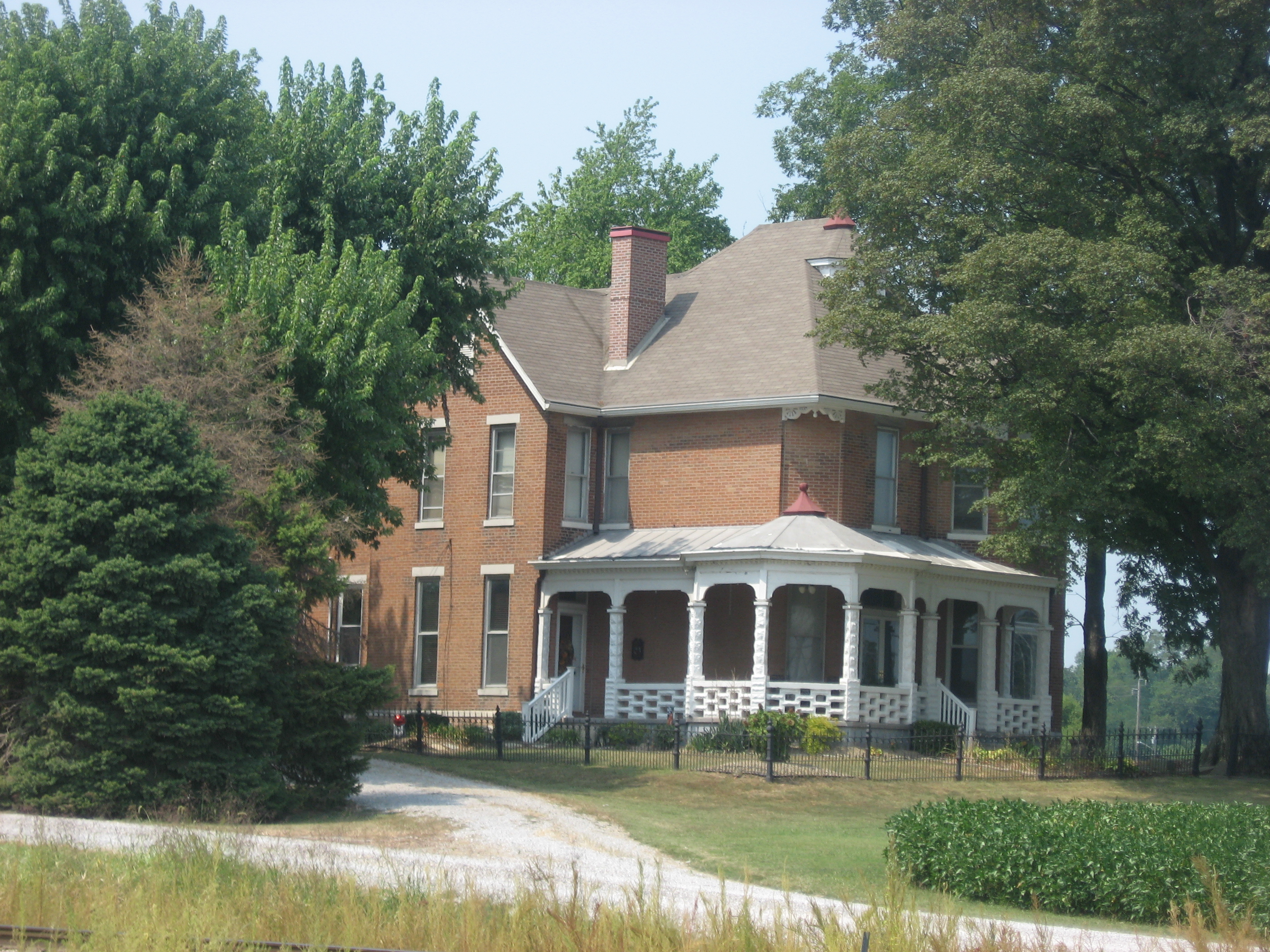
- Frederick and Augusta Hagemann Farmhouse, September 2011

- Location within Indiana Location within the United States
- Location: Jct. of IN 62 and IN 69, SW corner west of Mount Vernon in Black Township, Posey County, Indiana
- Coordinates: 37°55′35″N 87°54′37″W
- Area: 2 acres (0.81 ha)
- Built: c. 1895
- Architectural style: Queen Anne
- NRHP reference No.: 93000180
- Added to NRHP: March 18, 1993

Frederick and Augusta Hagemann Farm is a historic home and farm located in Black Township, Posey County, Indiana. The farmhouse was built about 1895, and is a 2 1/2-story, asymmetrical, Queen Anne style brick dwelling. It has limestone and wood detailing and features a projecting gable and wraparound porch with concrete block piers and a semi-octagonal corner. Also on the property are the contributing large frame barn (c. 1895), a smokehouse / privy (c. 1895), and a garage (c. 1925).

It was listed on the National Register of Historic Places in 1993.
