= Harmonie State Park =

State park in Posey County, Indiana

- Location within Indiana
- Location: Posey County, Indiana, USA
- Nearest city: New Harmony, Indiana
- Coordinates: 38.06°N 87.95°W
- Area: 3,465 acres (14.02 km^{2})
- Established: 1966
- Visitors: 131,785 (in 2018–2019)
- Governing body: Indiana Department of Natural Resources
- Website: Official website

Harmonie is a state park in Indiana. It is located in Posey County, Indiana, about 25 miles (40 km) northwest of Evansville, Indiana and about 4 miles (6.4 km) south of New Harmony at the end of Indiana 269.

Harmonie has many hiking trails and includes sheltered areas, a seasonal nature center with animal exhibits inside, it also has interpretive programs, and many other features. The park receives about 130,000 visitors annually.

The park used to have a pool. The pool was closed at the start of the COVID-19 pandemic in 2020 and never re-opened. It was announced in March 2023 that the pool facilities were being dismantled.

The park is 1 of 14 Indiana State Parks that are in the path of totality for the 2024 solar eclipse, with 3 minutes and 50 seconds of totality.

On April 2, 2024, an EF-2 Tornado with peak winds of 115 mph touched down in the park.
