= Hovey Lake-Klein Archeological Site =

Archaeological site in Indiana, U.S.

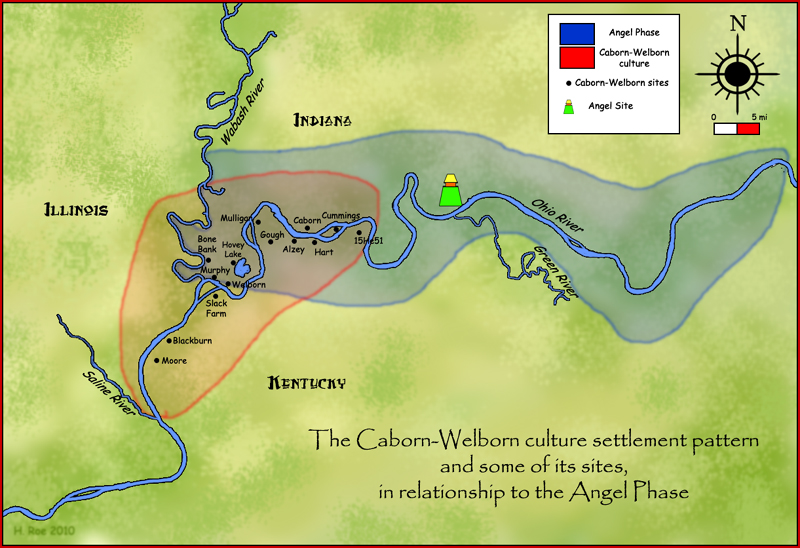
- Caborn-Welborn culture and some of its larger sites. Hovey Lake is in the center of the red area

- Location within Indiana
- 37°49′49.37″N 87°57′13.43″W
- Cultures: Caborn-Welborn variant of the Mississippian culture
- Location: Posey County, Indiana, United States
- Region: Posey County, Indiana

History
- Built: 1400
- Abandoned: 1650

Indiana Register of Historic Sites

Hovey Lake-Klein Archeological Site (12 PO 10) is an archaeological site of the Caborn-Welborn variant of the Mississippian culture. Hovey Lake-Klein Archeological Site is located on the west bank of Hovey Lake, a backwater lake near the Ohio River close to its confluence with the Wabash River. The site was an extensive village occupation dating between 1400 and 1650 CE.

== Description ==
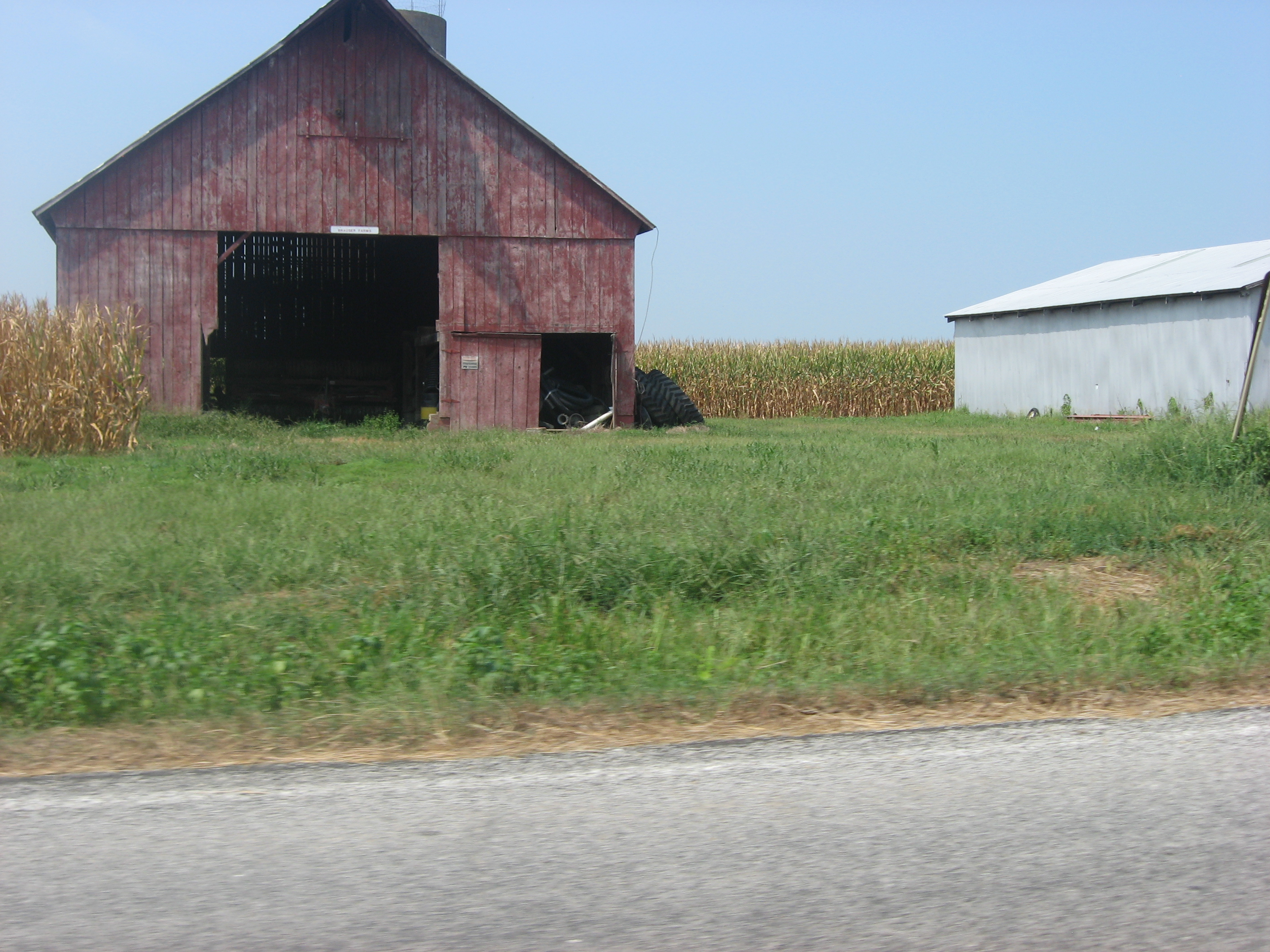
Buildings and grass at the site

The site is located on a terrace 3.6 km from the Ohio River adjacent to Hovey Lake, in Indiana. The site is roughly 11.8 ha. There was a centrally located plaza as well as an encircling palisade with bastions. Houses were typical Mississippian rectangular wall trench wattle and daub structures set in shallow basins. Many had prepared clay hearths. Located near most houses were special pits used to store maize and other dried foods. The pits were large enough to have stored enough grain to feed 7 to 12 people for a year.

== See also ==
- Caborn-Welborn culture
- Slack Farm
- List of Mississippian sites
