= Slack Farm =

Archaeological site in Kentucky, United States

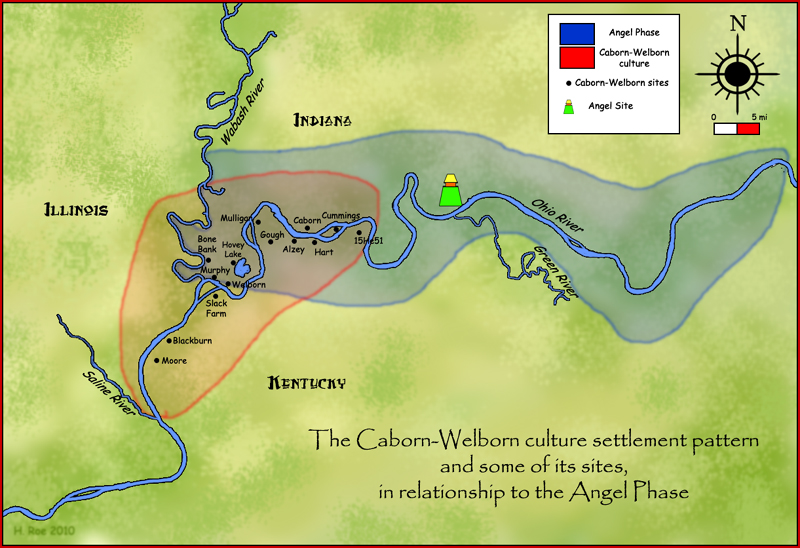
- Caborn-Welborn culture and some of its larger sites. Slack Farm is on the southern bank of the river.

- Location within Kentucky today
- 37°46′11.03″N 88°0′28.12″W
- Cultures: Caborn-Welborn variant of the Mississippian culture
- Location: Uniontown, Kentucky, Union County, Kentucky, US
- Region: Union County, Kentucky

History
- Built: 1400 CE

Site notes
- Architectural style: Platform mound

Slack Farm (15 UN 28) is an archaeological site of the Caborn-Welborn variant of the Mississippian culture. Slack Farm is located near Uniontown, Kentucky, close to the confluence of the Ohio River and the Wabash Rivers. The site included a Native American mound and an extensive village occupation dating between 1400 and 1650 CE. Although Slack Farm was long known to be one of the major villages of the Caborn-Welborn people, it became famous when it was very seriously damaged by looters in 1987.

== Description ==
The Slack Farm site is located on a projecting terrace and adjacent levee 300 metres (980 ft) from the Ohio River. There was a mound (Site 15 UN 70) located on the bluff overlooking the site. The Slack Farm site itself consisted of seven discrete village areas surrounding a central plaza and covering roughly 14 ha. A shallow ravine bisects the site running from the west to the south. Houses were typical Mississippian rectangular wall trench wattle and daub structures set in shallow basins. Many had prepared clay hearths. Located near most houses were special pits used to store maize and other dried foods. The pits were large enough to have stored enough grain to feed 7 to 12 people for a year.

=== Graves ===
Each section of the large village maintained its own cemetery. Burials were typically in extended positions. They were often laid out in parallel rows and the absence of overlapping burials suggests that they were marked in some way. Grave goods such as limestone disc pipes, shell beads and ear plugs, as well as small pottery jars were often included, usually near the body's upper torso. In Late Caborn-Welborn times, European trade goods such as glass beads, copper/brass bracelets and tubes were deposited in the graves. During the 1987 looting, 650 to 750 graves were opened by the looters. Human remains lay scattered everywhere after the looters had struck. Given the fact that infants and children are under-represented in this total, archaeologists speculate that as many as a thousand or more people could have been buried at the seven cemeteries at the site.

== 1987 looting and its effects ==
In 1987 the ten looters of Slack Farm paid $10,000 to a new landowner of the Slack Farm property for the right to dig at the site. After renting a tractor, the ten individuals spent two months destroying hundreds of Native American graves, Mississippian culture houses, and unknown other artifacts. Local complaints by the people of Uniontown led to the arrest of the perpetrators for the misdemeanor of "desecrating a venerable object" (a charge which is now a felony, in part due to the controversy over Slack Farm). Prosecution on this charge was difficult in the late 1980s, in part because this predated the passage of the Native American Graves Protection and Repatriation Act and related state legislation, which made it clearer that such activities were illegal.

The looting of Slack Farm contributed to the passage of more stringent laws in the state of Kentucky relating to the protection of burials, sacred grounds, and indigenous/archaeological sites. The damage done to Slack Farm attracted worldwide attention and was written about in National Geographic magazine, prompting widespread outcry against illicit removal of antiquities.

The hundreds of broken bones were reburied by Native American groups. As of May 2007, Native American groups still meet in the area to commemorate the site and mourn the damage done.

== See also ==
- Caborn-Welborn culture
- Hovey Lake-Klein Archeological Site
- Mississippian culture
- Angel Mounds
- List of Mississippian sites
