= Black Township, Posey County, Indiana =

Black Township Posey County
- Township
- Coordinates: 37°56′59″N 87°55′04″W
- Country: United States
- State: Indiana
- County: Posey

Government
  - Type: Indiana township

Area
  - Total: 88.95 sq mi (230.37 km^{2})
  - Land: 87.03 sq mi (225.41 km^{2})
  - Water: 1.92 sq mi (4.96 km^{2})
- Elevation: 420 ft (128 m)

Population (2020)
  - Total: 9,032
  - Density: 103.8/sq mi (40.07/km^{2})
- FIPS code: 18-05428
- GNIS feature ID: 453112

Black Township is one of ten townships in Posey County, Indiana. As of the 2020 census, its population was 9,032. The township is the largest both in terms of area and population in Posey County.

Historical population
Census	Pop.	Note	%±
1890	7,907		—
1900	7,991		1.1%
1910	8,234		3.0%
1920	7,623		−7.4%
1930	7,118		−6.6%
1940	7,557		6.2%
1950	8,173		8.2%
1960	7,869		−3.7%
1970	9,268		17.8%
1980	10,429		12.5%
1990	9,962		−4.5%
2000	10,288		3.3%
2010	9,450		−8.1%
2020	9,032		−4.4%
Source: US Decennial Census

== History ==
Black Township was organized in 1817. The township was named for the Black family of pioneer settlers.

The Frederick and Augusta Hagemann Farm, Mann site, and Mount Vernon site are listed on the National Register of Historic Places.

== Adjacent Townships ==
- Indiana
  - Posey County
    - Lynn Township (North)
    - Marrs Township (East)
    - Point Township (Southwest)
    - Robinson Township (Single Point)
- Illinois
  - White County
    - Emma Township (West)
- Kentucky
  - Henderson County
    - Corydon District (Southeast)
  - Union County
    - Uniontown District (South Central)

== Cities ==
- Mount Vernon

== Unincorporated places ==
- Dead Mans Crossing
- Erwin
- Farmersville
- Grafton
- Upton
- Welborn Switch

== Education ==
It is within the Metropolitan School District of Mt. Vernon, which operates Mount Vernon High School.
