= Amon Clarence Thomas House =

Historic house in Indiana, United States

- U.S. National Register of Historic Places
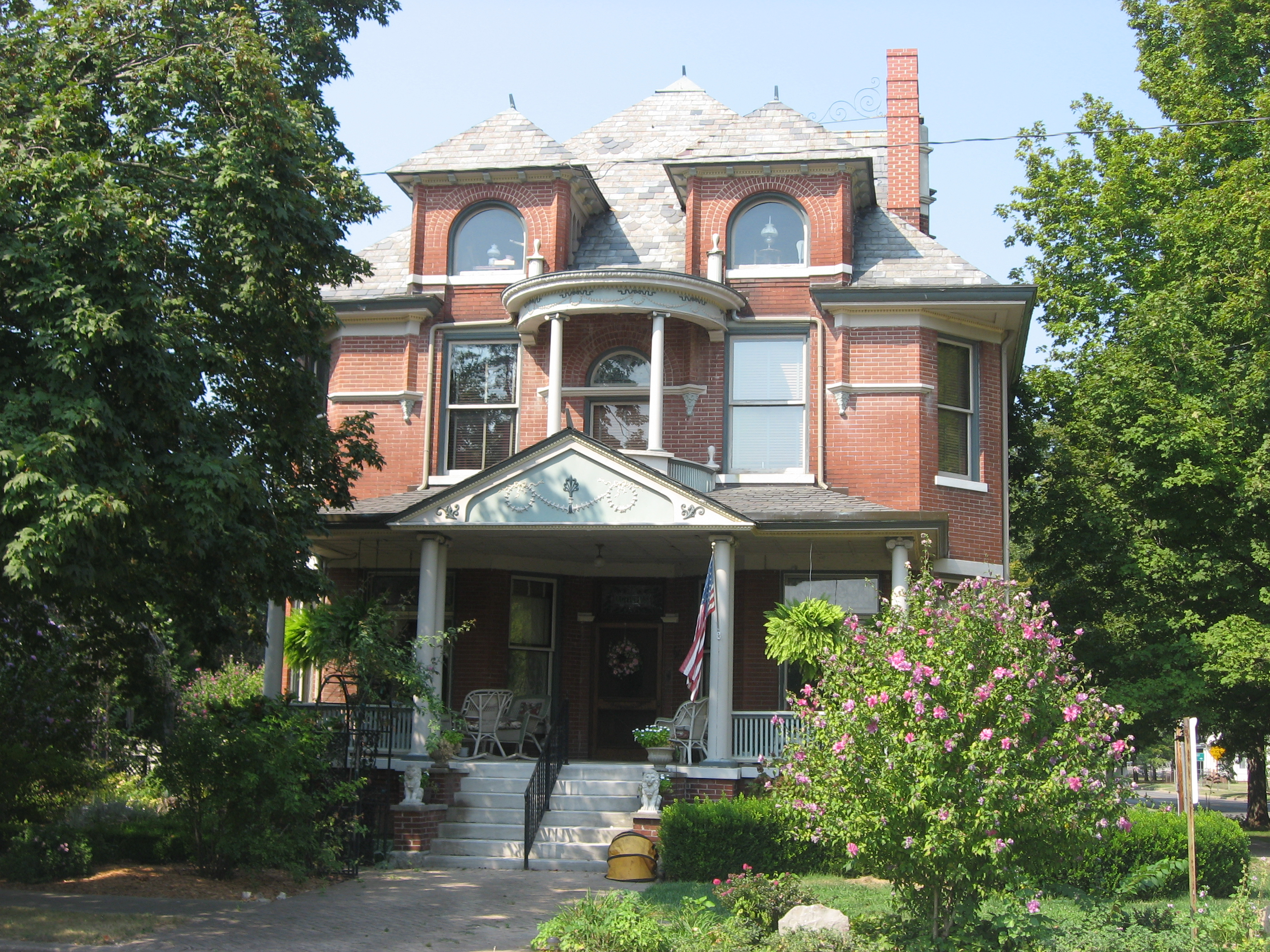
- Amon Clarence Thomas House, September 2011

- Location within Indiana Location within the United States
- Location: 503 West St., New Harmony, Indiana
- Coordinates: 38°7′46″N 87°56′13″W
- Area: less than one acre
- Built: 1899
- Architect: Harris and Shopbell
- Architectural style: Queen Anne, Romanesque, Classical Revival
- NRHP reference No.: 95001111
- Added to NRHP: September 14, 1995

Amon Clarence Thomas House is a historic home located at New Harmony, Indiana. It was built in 1899, and is a 2 1/2-story, eclectic red brick dwelling with Queen Anne, Romanesque Revival, and Classical Revival style design elements. It has fortress-like massing and sits on a brick and limestone foundation. It features a steep hipped slate roof, projecting semi-octagonal bays, two-level porch with Ionic order columns, and arched openings.

It was listed on the National Register of Historic Places in 1995.
