= Pitcher House (Mount Vernon, Indiana) =

Historic house in Indiana, United States

- Pitcher House (Fullinwider House)
- Formerly listed on the U.S. National Register of Historic Places
- Location: 530 College Ave., Mount Vernon, Indiana
- Area: less than one acre
- Built: 1867
- Architect: Pitcher, John
- Architectural style: Greek Revival, Federal
- NRHP reference No.: 80000031

Significant dates
- Added to NRHP: February 8, 1980
- Removed from NRHP: September 14, 1989

Pitcher House , also known as Fullinwider House, was a historic home located at Mount Vernon, Indiana. It was built in 1867, and was a two-story, Federal / Greek Revival style painted brick dwelling. It featured a full-width front porch. It has been demolished.

It was listed on the National Register of Historic Places in 1980 and delisted in 1989.
