= Hovey Lake Fish and Wildlife Area =

Recreational area in Indiana, U.S.

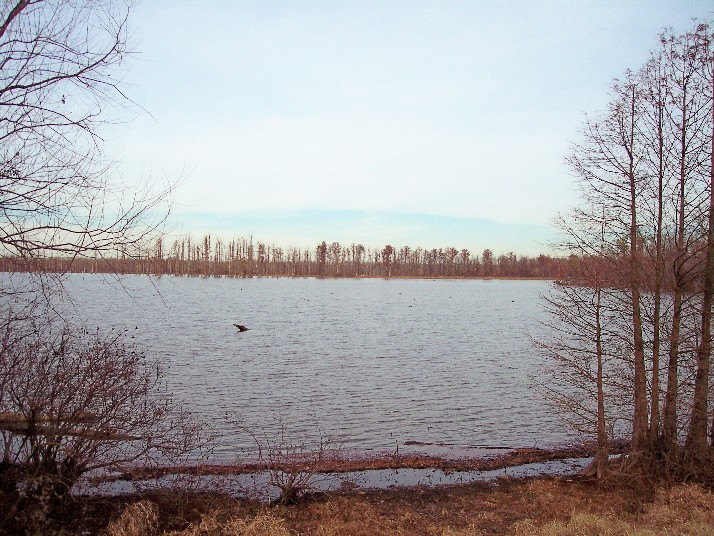
- Hovey Lake

- Location within Indiana
- Coordinates: 37°49′N 87°56′W

Bald cypress stand rising from the water at Hovey Lake, one of Indiana's few naturally occurring stands, photographed in 2026.

Hovey Lake Fish and Wildlife Area is a nearly 7,000-acre (28 km^{2}) recreational area operated by the Indiana Department of Natural Resources near Mount Vernon, Indiana.

The land comprising Hovey Lake FWA was originally ceded to the Indiana Territory by the Treaty of Vincennes in 1804, and then granted to the Wabash and Erie Canal Company. With the failure of the canal, the land was acquired by Charles Hovey.
