= List of archaeological sites on the National Register of Historic Places in Indiana =

This is a list of archaeological sites on the National Register of Historic Places in Indiana.

Historic sites in the United States qualify to be listed on the National Register of Historic Places by passing one or more of four different criteria; Criterion D permits the inclusion of proven and potential archaeological sites. More than fifty different sites in Indiana are listed under this criterion, including both Native American and European sites, and two others were once listed but have been removed. This list includes all properties in Indiana that qualify under this criterion.

== Current listings ==
	Landmark name	Image	Location	County	Culture	Comments
1	Angel Mounds		Knight Township: 8 miles southeast of Evansville in Angel Mounds State Memorial; 37°56′31″N 87°27′35″W	Vanderburgh	Mississippian: Angel	
2	Archeological Sites 12Ma648 and 12Ma649		Lawrence Township: atop a hill above Fall Creek in the northwestern corner of Fort Harrison State Park; 39°52′31″N 86°1′52″W	Marion	Multiple: Early Archaic through Late Woodland, and European	
3	Ashworth Archaeological Site (12 Po 7)		Point Township: eastern side of State Road 69, about 1 mile (1.6 km) north of Hovey Lake; 37°51′0″N 87°56′10″W	Posey	Mississippian: Caborn-Welborn	
4	Bono Archaeological Site (12 Lr 194)		Bono Township: on a bluff above the White River, ½ mile west of the riverbank and 1 mile north of Bono; 38°44′41″N 86°19′42″W	Lawrence	Late Archaic	
5	Castor Farm Site		White River Township: river bottoms below the Strawtown Enclosure; 40°7′44″N 85°57′9″W	Hamilton	Late Woodland: Oliver, Younge, and Western Basin	
6	Chrysler Enclosure		New Castle: western side of Ross St. at Chrysler High School; 39°54′41″N 85°22′32″W	Henry	Woodland: Adena	
7	Collier Lodge Site		Pleasant Township: 1099 Baum's Bridge Rd., southwest of Kouts; 41°16′32″N 87°4′18″W	Porter	Multiple: Early Archaic through Upper Mississippian, and European	
8	Daugherty-Monroe Archaeological Site (12SU13)		Turman Township: northern half of Section 21 Town 8 North Range 11 West; 39°7′30″N 87°38′22″W	Sullivan	Late Woodland: Allison-Lamotte	
9	Delphi Lime Kilns		Deer Creek Township: north-northwest of Delphi; 40°35′45″N 86°40′43″W	Carroll	Historic: European	
10	Ellerbusch Archeological Site (12W56)		Ohio Township: atop the bluff northwest of the junction of State Road 662 and Ellerbursch Rd., west of Newburgh; 37°57′9.4″N 87°25′32.4″W	Warrick	Mississippian: Angel	
11	Ennis Archaeological Site (12 OW 229)		Clay and Richland Townships: along the Monroe/Owen county line on the southern edge of the Flatwoods region, west of Ellettsville; 39°14′18″N 86°41′3″W	Monroe and Owen	Archaic	
12	Epsilon II Archeological Site (12MO133)		Polk Township: on the Lake Monroe shoreline at Ransburg Scout Reservation, southeast of Bloomington; 39°2′48″N 86°26′22″W	Monroe	Late Archaic	
13	Fort Knox II Site		Vincennes: 3 miles north of downtown Vincennes; 38°43′27″N 87°30′24″W	Knox	Historic: European	
14	Fort Ouiatenon		Wabash Township: along River Rd. and the Wabash River, west of the Purdue University Airport and west of Lafayette; 40°24′20″N 86°58′48″W	Tippecanoe	Historic: European	
15	Fudge Site		White River Township: immediately southwest of the confluence of Sugar Creek and the White River, northwest of Winchester; 40°11′8″N 84°59′27″W	Randolph	Woodland: Adena and Hopewell	
16	Glendale Ridge Archaeological Site (12 Da 86)		Harrison Township: above the White River in the Glendale State Fish and Wildlife Area, southeast of Hudsonville; 38°30′56″N 87°2′54″W	Daviess	Archaic: Riverton	
17	Francis Godfroy Cemetery		Butler Township: State Road 124, east of Peru; 40°45′3″N 85°59′35″W	Miami	Historic: Miami	
18	Hovey Lake Archaeological District		Point Township: between Hovey Lake and the Ohio River in the Hovey Lake Fish and Wildlife Area; 37°49′48″N 87°55′12″W	Posey	Mississippian: Caborn-Welborn	
19	Mitchell P. Howes' Lime Kiln and Quarry		Utica: Upper River Rd. 38°20′30″N 85°38′54″W	Clark	Historic: European	
20	Jennison Guard Site		Lawrenceburg Township: between a rail line and the Ohio River, just west of the mouth of the Great Miami River and northeast of Lawrenceburg; 39°6′32″N 84°49′30″W	Dearborn	Fort Ancient	
21	Kappa V Archeological Site (12MO301)		Polk Township: peninsula on the southern shore of Lake Monroe, southeast of Bloomington; 39°4′36″N 86°22′34″W	Monroe	Late Archaic	
22	Lock No. 33 Lock Keeper's House, and Wabash and Erie Canal Lock No. 33		Deer Creek Township: along the Wabash and Erie Canal south of Bicycle Bridge Rd., southwest of Delphi; 40°34′52″N 86°41′0″W	Carroll	Historic: European	
23	Low Spur Archeological Site (12J87)		Jackson Township: southwestern quarter of the northwestern quarter of the southeastern quarter of the southeastern quarter of Section 23, Township 6 North, Range 6 East; 38°56′33″N 85°49′10″W	Jackson	Late Archaic	
24	Mann Site		Black Township: off Indian Mound Rd., southeast of Mount Vernon; 37°54′44.5″N 87°50′20″W	Posey	Middle Woodland: Hopewell	
25	MATERIAL SERVICE (shipwreck)		North Township: Lake Michigan, northeast of Calumet Harbor; 41°44′33″N 87°30′23″W	Lake	Historic: European	
26	Merom Site and Fort Azatlan		Gill Township and Merom: north of Merom; 39°3′45″N 87°34′12″W	Sullivan	Mississippian	
27	Mounds State Park		Anderson and Union Township: 3 miles east of Anderson on State Road 32; 40°6′1″N 85°37′19″W	Madison	Middle Woodland	
28	Mount Vernon Site		Black Township: atop a ridgeline about 100 metres (330 ft) south of County Road 850S, near the entrance to the Mount Vernon General Electric plant and southwest of Mount Vernon; 37°54′48″N 87°56′24″W	Posey	Middle Woodland: Hopewell	
29	Murphy Archeological Site		Point Township: northwestern side of Pitcher Lake, approximately 1 mile (1.6 km) east of the mouth of the Wabash River and southwest of Mount Vernon; 37°48′25″N 88°0′5″W	Posey	Mississippian	
30	MUSKEGON Shipwreck Site		Michigan City: in Lake Michigan, 1 mile (1.6 km) southwest of the Michigan City Lighthouse; 41°42′48″N 86°56′6″W	LaPorte	Historic: European	
31	Mussel Knoll Archeological Site (12GI11)		Wabash Township: along the Wabash River in the middle of Section 14 in far northeastern Wabash Township, west of Skelton; 38°20′25″N 87°49′22″W	Gibson	Late Archaic	
32	New Castle Archeological Site		Henry Township: grounds of the former New Castle State Hospital, southeast of the confluence of the Big and Little Blue Rivers, and northeast of New Castle; 39°57′20″N 85°21′6″W	Henry	Middle Woodland: Hopewell	
33	Old Clarksville Site		Clarksville: off Harrison Ave. at the Ohio River; 38°17′13″N 85°46′34″W	Clark	Historic: European	
34	Osborn Site		Fairplay Township: southeastern quarter of the southwestern quarter of Section 28 Town 7 North Range 5 West, southwest of Bloomfield; 39°0′36″N 86°58′19″W	Greene	Late Woodland: Allison-Lamotte	
35	Potts Creek Rockshelter Archeological Site (12CR110)		Union Township: southern side of State Road 62, 1.25 miles (2.01 km) east of St. Croix; 38°13′42″N 86°33′45″W	Crawford	Multiple: Paleo-Indian through Woodland	
36	Prairie Creek Site		Washington Township: southeastern bank of Prairie Creek, 1.5 kilometres (0.93 mi) below the western edge of the Thousand Acre Woods and north of Washington; 38°43′4″N 87°9′55″W	Daviess	Paleo-Indian	
37	Pyramid Mound (12k14)		Vincennes: southern side of Wabash Avenue, southeast of central Vincennes; 38°40′14″N 87°30′22″W	Knox	Mississippian	
38	Chief Richardville House and Miami Treaty Grounds		Huntington and Huntington Township: 2 miles (3.2 km) west of downtown Huntington, southwest of the junction of U.S. Route 24 and State Roads 9/37; 40°52′37″N 85°31′58″W	Huntington	Historic: Miami	
39	Chief Jean-Baptiste de Richardville House		Fort Wayne: 5705 Bluffton Rd. 41°1′53″N 85°9′52″W	Allen	Historic: Miami	
40	Rockhouse Cliffs Rock Shelters (12PE98; 12PE100)		Union Township: about 50 feet (15 m) from the spring in Rockhouse Hollow, northwest of Derby; 38°3′36″N 86°34′40″W	Perry	Multiple: Early Archaic through Mississippian	
41	Sand Hill Archeological Site 12J62		Jackson Township: southeastern quarter of the northwestern quarter of the southeastern quarter of the northwestern quarter of Section 36, Township 6 North, Range 6 East; 38°55′13″N 85°48′32″W	Jackson	Multiple: Early Archaic through Late Woodland	
42	Smith-Sutton Site		Utica Township: 2000 Utica-Sellersburg Rd., northeast of Jeffersonville; 38°20′19″N 85°40′32″W	Clark	Mississippian	
43	Samuel Starkweather's Lime Kiln and Quarry		Utica Township: Upper River Rd. 38°20′46″N 85°38′43″W	Clark	Historic: European	
44	State Line Archeological District		Greendale: straddling the Ohio/Indiana border, 2 miles (3.2 km) north of the Ohio River; 39°8′15″N 84°49′12″W	Dearborn	Fort Ancient	Extends into Hamilton County, Ohio
45	Strawtown Enclosure		White River Township: northern side of Strawtown Ave., west of Strawtown; 40°7′35″N 85°57′6″W	Hamilton	Late Woodland: Oliver	
46	Sunset Point		Deer Creek Township: confluence of Deer Creek and the Wabash River; 40°34′19.6″N 86°41′18″W	Carroll	Historic: European	
47	Swan's Landing Archeological Site (12HR304)		Washington Township: mile 658 on the Ohio River, north of New Amsterdam at the end of Lickford Bridge Rd. 38°7′54.5″N 86°16′8″W	Harrison	Early Archaic	
48	Taylor Ten		White River Township: floodplain on the eastern side of a bend of the White River, southwest of Strawtown; 40°7′6″N 85°58′14″W	Hamilton	Late Woodland: Oliver	
49	Moses H. Tyler Company Lime Kiln and Quarry No. 1		Utica Township: Upper River Rd. 38°20′32″N 85°38′53″W	Clark	Historic: European	
50	Weber Village Archaeological Site (12 Gi 13)		Montgomery Township: north central portion of Section 18, about 0.25 miles (0.40 km) west of Skelton; 38°20′36″N 87°47′29″W	Gibson	Middle Woodland: Havana Hopewell	
51	Windsor Mound		Stoney Creek Township: 12102 W. Windsor Rd., south of Parker City; 40°9′24″N 85°12′24″W	Randolph	Middle Woodland	
52	Yankeetown Archeological Site		Anderson Township: along the Ohio River bank in Section 21 of Anderson Township, south of Yankeetown; 37°54′1″N 87°18′22″W	Warrick	Multiple: Late Woodland through Mississippian	

== Former listings ==
	Landmark name	Image	Location	County	Culture	Comments
1	Axsom Branch Archeological Site (12BR12)		Washington Township: Lake Monroe shoreline, west of the Terrill Cemetery; 39°3′22″N 86°20′24″W	Brown	Late Archaic	
2	Refuge No. 7 Archeological Site (12BR11)		Washington Township: on the Lake Monroe shoreline, south of Deckard Ridge; 39°3′44″N 86°21′56″W	Brown	Late Archaic	

== See also ==
- National Register of Historic Places listings in Indiana
