= Archeological Sites 12Ma648 and 12Ma649 =

- U.S. National Register of Historic Places
- Location: Address restricted, Lawrence Township, Marion County, Indiana, USA
- NRHP reference No.: 11000912
- Added to NRHP: December 20, 2011

Archeological sites 12Ma689 and 12Ma649 are sister archeological sites located within what is today known as Fort Harrison State Park in Lawrence Township, Marion County, Indiana. They were first documented in a 1994 survey of the Fort Harrison grounds. Their earliest use was likely as a location for maintenance of stone tools, such as arrowheads, during the prehistoric period. Later occupation during the Archaic and Woodland periods is linked to agricultural use. The site was added to the National Register of Historic Places in 2011.

== Archeological surveys ==
The sites were initially assessed by Gray & Pape, Inc. in 1994, who uncovered numerous prehistoric artifacts and concluded the sites' potential eligibility for the National Register of Historic Places. Further study was undertaken by Martin University's Next Step Education through Archaeology Project (NSEAP) starting in 1999. Initial investigations of Site 12Ma648 yielded 53 artifacts; later efforts by the NSEAP uncovered 58 additional prehistoric lithic artifacts. Site 12Ma649 revealed an even higher density of artifacts. Gray & Pape's 1994 survey found 66 lithic artifacts, and later NSEAP fieldwork would bring the total number found of lithics (including debitage) to 431. 12Ma648 and 12Ma649 fall under the lithic scatter prehistoric site type due to their lack of clear site function and low artifact density, with a large proportion of found material being lithics. The sites were extensively surveyed through surface collection.

== History ==
=== Prehistoric period ===
The site is located in the Tipton Till Plain region within a forested zone with glacial features dominated by beech, maple, and oak trees. The settlement was near a water source, with seasonal water levels in the area being higher prior to the building of Geist Reservoir in 1943 diverting water flow significantly. The early years of the site yield archaeological records that point to temporary, irregular habitation as a tool maintenance site during the Early and Late Archaic and Late Woodland periods. The sites have not yet been identified as representing any specific Late Archaic cultural group. Discoveries of worked Wyandotte chert on-site could indicate trade links with peoples from southern Indiana and northern Kentucky.

The Late Archaic (ca. 8000-6000 B.C.E.) was a period of cultural and climactic changes spurred by the recession of ice sheets. Peoples began to settle and build complex societies, including a decrease in mobile societies and more agriculture. Temperatures rose and deciduous trees replaced pine forests in around 8,000 B.C.E., and melting glaciers made new waterways and created fertile valleys. Recovered projectile points found at 12Ma649 linked to the Late Archaic include a McWhinney Heavy Stemmed point, Kamak Stemmed point, and Trimble Side Notched point varieties; a Matanzas projectile point from site 12Ma648 is also believed to be from this period. The projectile points found were likely used to hunt small game like elk or deer.

The Albee Phase and the Oliver Phase were the two cultural groups that dominated central Indiana in the Late Woodland period (ca. 500-1500 C.E.). Oliver phase societies during the Late Woodland period cultivated maize. The rise in agriculture made way for a more sedentary lifestyle and the beginnings of settlements. The bow and arrow also came into use during this period. Madison projectile points found at both 12Ma648 and 12Ma649 are linked to this era.

=== Modern era ===
12Ma648 and 12Ma649 are similar sites, with the main difference between the two being larger amount of material recovered from 12Ma649. The mean ceramic dates for 12Ma648 and 12Ma649 are 1845/1855 and 1837, respectively. Lawrence Township was formally established on September 4, 1822, with land grants being issued until around 1837. County atlases from around these time periods do not indicate any structure being present on the property, but remains of bricks found in investigations imply otherwise. Soil probes conducted in 2001 found disturbances in the land indicating possible plow agriculture. The settlement type has been labeled as ephemeral farmstead sites, with seasonal laborers or possibly squatters living onsite.

The site may have ties to African-American history, as labels on 19th century maps show a Colored Baptist church and Black school were located nearby.

Ownership of much of the land that comprised Fort Benjamin Harrison was handed over to the Indiana Department of Natural Resources, who developed the area into Fort Harrison State Park.

==== 12Ma648 ====
12Ma648 was a farmstead site divided into 5,074 1x1 meter units. The property containing the site passed through a series of several owners before its acquisition and conversion into a military base in 1904. The first legal owner of the site, John Johnson (A.K.A. John Johnston), owned the land from September 1826 to 1832. Elisha Reddick, Johnson's son-in-law, bought hundreds of adjacent acres to be used as part of a large family farming settlement. Johnson later sold the property containing Site 12Ma648 to Reddick in September 1832. Reddick, while not holding the first land patents issued in the area, is considered the first White settler in Lawrence Township. This distinction from earlier land patent holders may be due to Reddick being the first to settle, as opposed to earlier landowners who only used the property for farming while living elsewhere. Elisha Reddick owned the land containing the site only briefly, as he sold it to his neighbor, Frederick Sheets, for $209 within hours of holding it. Sheets may have been responsible for some of the architectural remains (possibly from a residence or outhouse) found at 12Ma648. Elijah T. Fletcher, son of Calvin Fletcher, owned the land from 1873 until his death in 1891. The last owner of the site was Robert E. Poindexter, who held the land from 1894 to 1903. He sold the land to the United States Government for $85 per acre, who converted the site into what is known today as Fort Benjamin Harrison. Family of many of the previous owners are buried in the Old Silvey Cemetery in Lawrence Township.

Three types of brick were found at the site: hard brick, soft brick, and hard glazed brick. James VanderVeen's 2005 archeological report theorizes the bricks once constituted different regions of a fireplace. Hard glazed brick would have made up the firebox, while the softer brick may have originally been a harder brick apron around the firebox before being exposed to water and rot in an area close to the ground. The remaining hard brick would have made up the rest of the fireplace and chimney. The brick remnants could also represent a deposit of unusable materials from a spoliation process while building.

Faunal remains found in the area offer some ideas about the diet and socioeconomic status of the former residents. The majority of the collected faunal remains were pig bones. The rest were canid, raccoon, rodent, and bird. A 2006 study by NSEAP staff Trisha Sterkel and Sarah Kiley concluded occupants of the site were opportunistic hunters without many domestic options for protein. Findings indicate they likely lacked the resources for expensive farming animals, livestock, or farming equipment.

Ceramic artifacts point to the mean date of occupation occurring in the 1850s. The latest dated material found is from 1863, sourced from a C.L. Holmes grocery token.

A 3.8 m × 3.4 m (12 ft × 11 ft) depression at the site was documented and excavated in 2001. The area was formerly a pit used as a dump site by pioneer era inhabitants. Based on dating of artifacts found with the pit, the material within may represent the widow Mary Nesbit's belongings after the land sale to Thomas P. Silvey.

==== 12Ma649 ====
12Ma649 was divided into 3,754 1x1 meter units. 12Ma649 is a similar site to 12Ma648, with the main difference being the higher volume of material recovered from 12Ma649. The total of ceramic sherds recovered from the area is 1,856. According to a 2006 survey, it is also relatively rare for being a terrace type lithic scatter site, with only 17.65% of lithic scatter sites in Marion County matching this type. The site contains evidence of a structure standing at some point during the 19th century, most likely a log cabin. The residents of the cabin are unknown, but the landowners during periods of occupation all worked within the agricultural sphere.

== See also ==
- List of archaeological sites on the National Register of Historic Places in Indiana
