= Taylor Ten =

Archaeological site in Ohio, United States

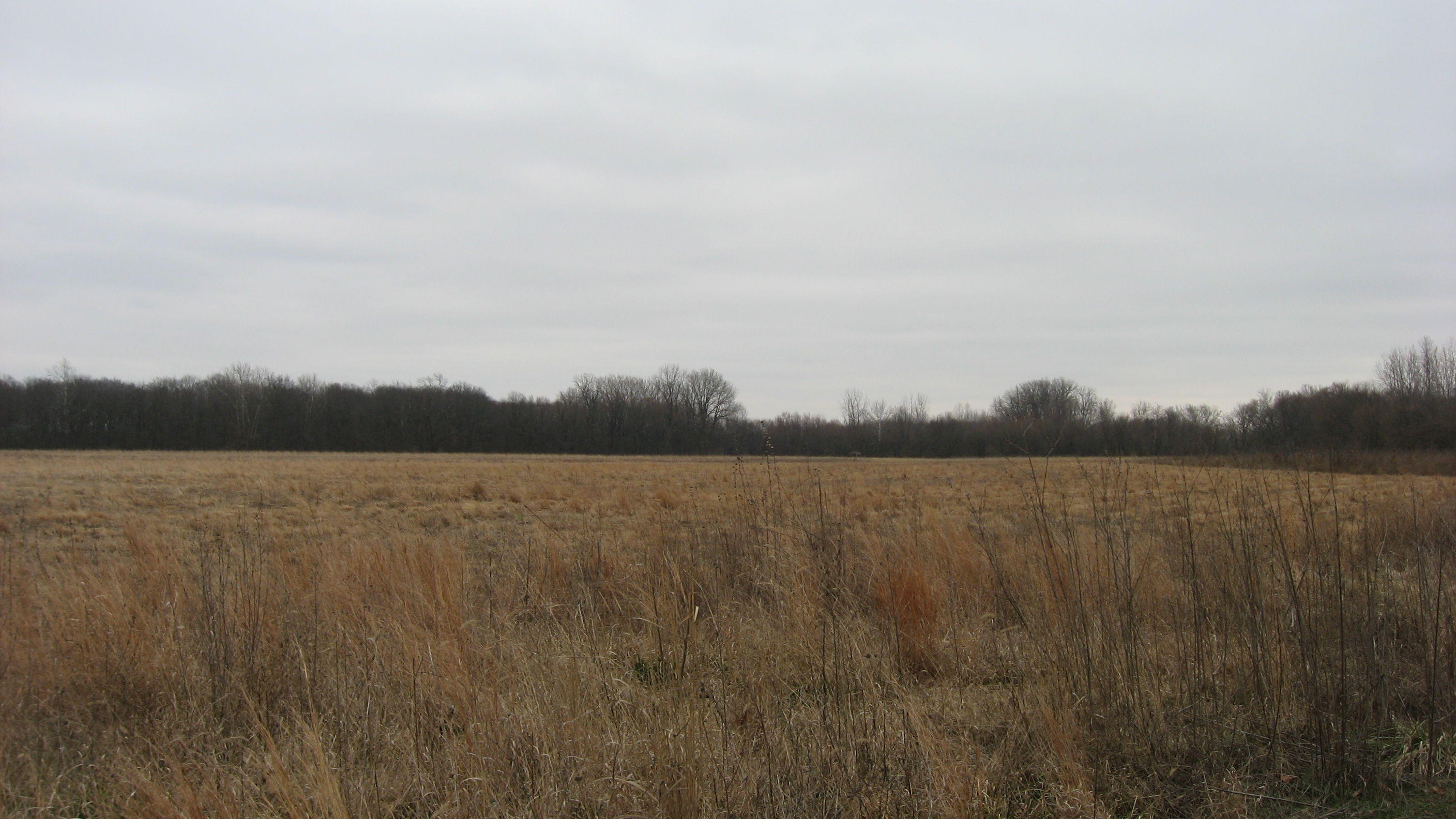
Fields in the Stawtown Koteewi Park near the White River and west of Strawtown in White River Township, Hamilton County, Indiana, United States.

Taylor Ten is a prehistoric settlement in Hamilton County, Indiana. The site was nominated to the National Register of Historic Places by the Archaeological Resource Management Service (ARMS) at Ball State University in 2008.

Taylor Ten was a significant Late Woodland/Late Prehistoric habitation. Archeologists have discovered over 3800 lithic and ceramic artifacts and over 3500 fragments of animal bone at the site. Most of the material recovered is associated with the Castor Phase dating between AD 1000 and 1400. A few Albee phase and Oliver phase pottery shards were also recovered. The site contains significant information to help refine the Castor Phase and data to help explore the relationship of contemporary late Woodland/Late Prehistoric populations.

== See also ==
- List of archaeological sites on the National Register of Historic Places in Indiana
