= Rockhouse Cliffs Rockshelters =

- Rockhouse Cliffs Rock Shelters (12PE98; 12PE100)
- U.S. National Register of Historic Places
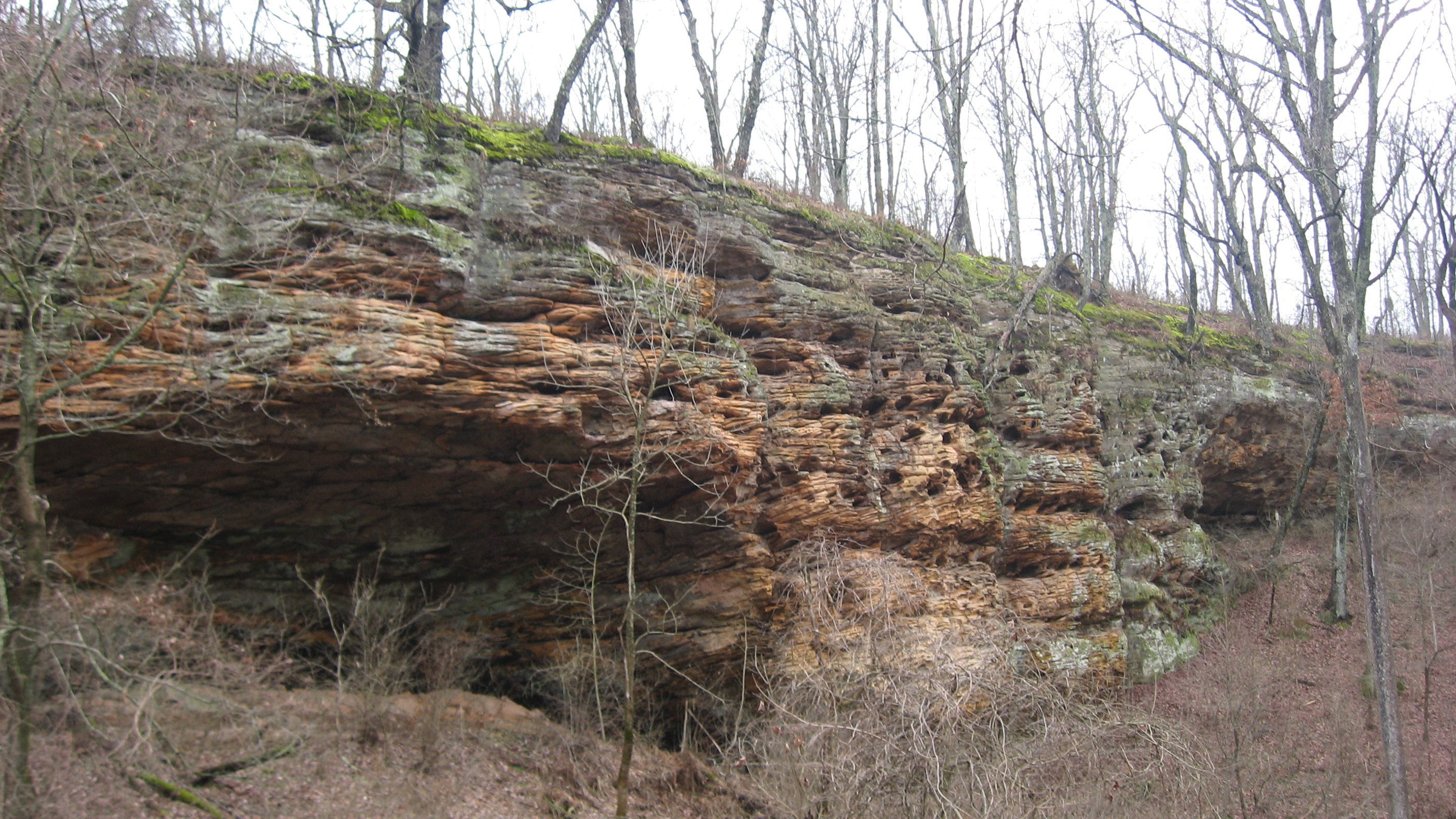
- Comprehensive view of the shelters; 12PE100 to the left and 12PE98 to the right

- Location within Indiana Location within the United States
- Location: By the spring in Rockhouse Hollow, northwest of Derby, Indiana
- Coordinates: 38°3′35″N 86°34′40″W
- Area: 1 acre (0.40 ha)
- NRHP reference No.: 86000918
- Added to NRHP: April 25, 1986

The Rockhouse Cliffs Rockshelters (12PE98 and 12PE100) are a pair of rockshelters in the far southern region of the U.S. state of Indiana. Located amid broken terrain in the Hoosier National Forest, the shelters may have been inhabited for more than ten thousand years by peoples ranging from the Early Archaic period until the twentieth century. As a result of their extensive occupation and their remote location, they are important and well-preserved archaeological sites and have been named a historic site.

== Geology ==
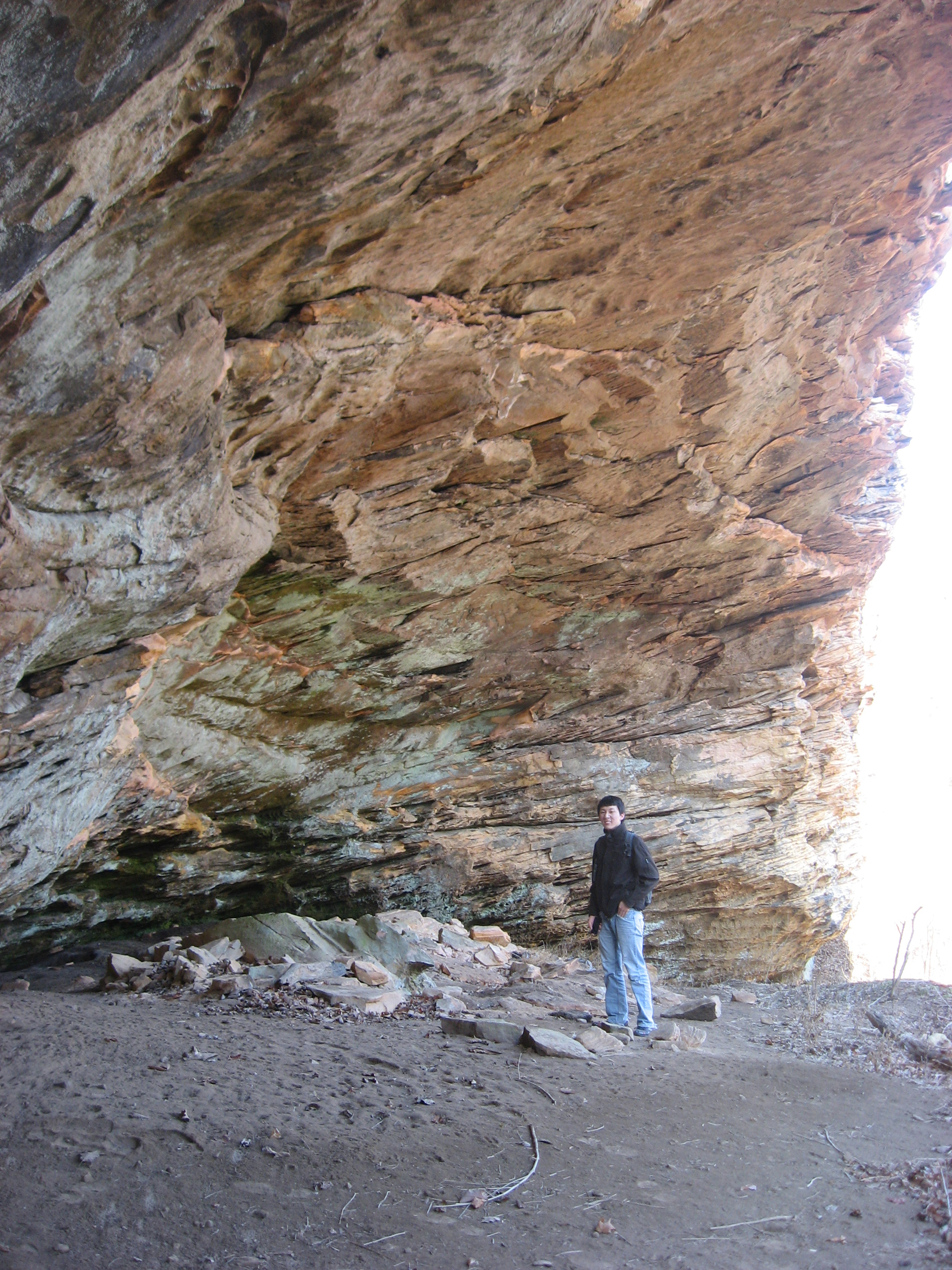
12PE100, with a human 6 feet (1.8 m) tall for size comparison

The shelters are located in western Union Township just south of the Leopold Township line in central Perry County; their PLSS location is Section 24, Township 5 South, Range 2 West. This portion of the county is extremely difficult of access: Perry County is the hilliest part of Indiana, and the land surrounding the shelters is isolated even by Perry County standards. The area was once heavily cultivated, but during the 1930s, the Civilian Conservation Corps engaged in a reforestation program on the former farmsteads. Rockshelters are common in the region; a cursory field survey found 70 shelters countywide in 1953.

Between the two shelters, 50 feet (15 m) away from the southern shelter, lies a small spring. A road formerly ran atop the cliff edge, but when the area became a forest preserve, the road was abandoned, and it was inaccessible to all wheeled vehicles by the 1950s.

== Archaeological investigations ==
Some of the earliest digging at the site appears to have occurred during the 1930s: one reforestation team active in the area was led by an avid pothunter, and every new rockshelter that he encountered was subject to "exploration" by his crewmen. The Rockhouse Cliffs Rockshelters were recorded by the first scholarly archaeological survey of Perry County. Conducted by a team led by University of Georgia archaeologist James H. Kellar in mid-1953, the survey operated under the sponsorship of the Indiana Historical Bureau and the guidance of Indiana University archaeologist Glenn Black.

== Conclusions ==
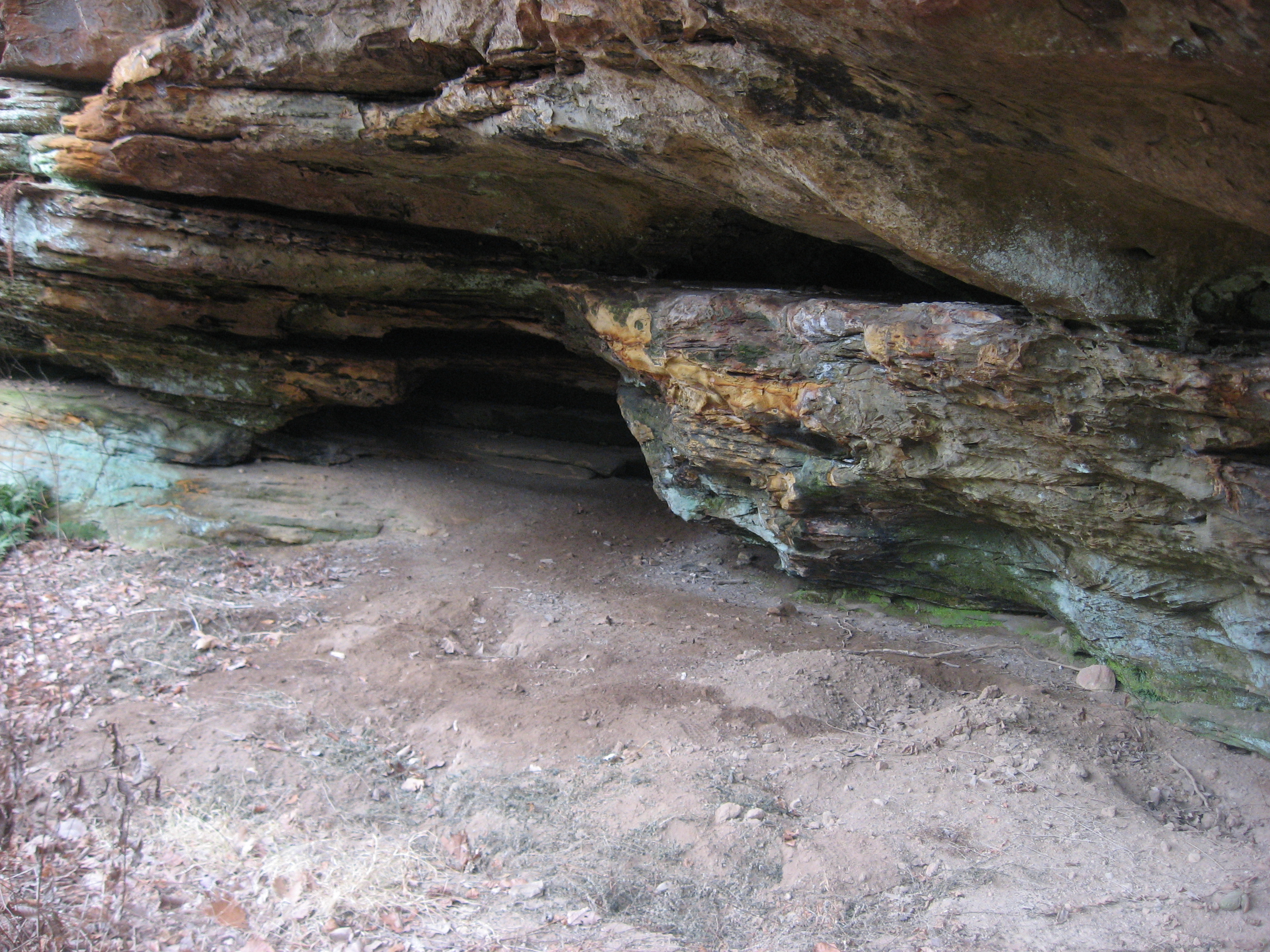
Floor of 12PE98 at the back of the shelter

Rockhouse Cliffs was occasionally inhabited during the Early Archaic period, although neither Rockhouse Cliffs nor other shelters in the Hoosier National Forest has produced signs of house construction. Among the distinctive forms of Archaic points found at the site is the Elk River Stemmed type; Rockhouse Cliffs is one of the most important sites known to have yielded this point, which has been found as far away as Russell Cave in northern Alabama as well as in prominent closer sites such as western Kentucky's Indian Knoll.

== Preservation ==
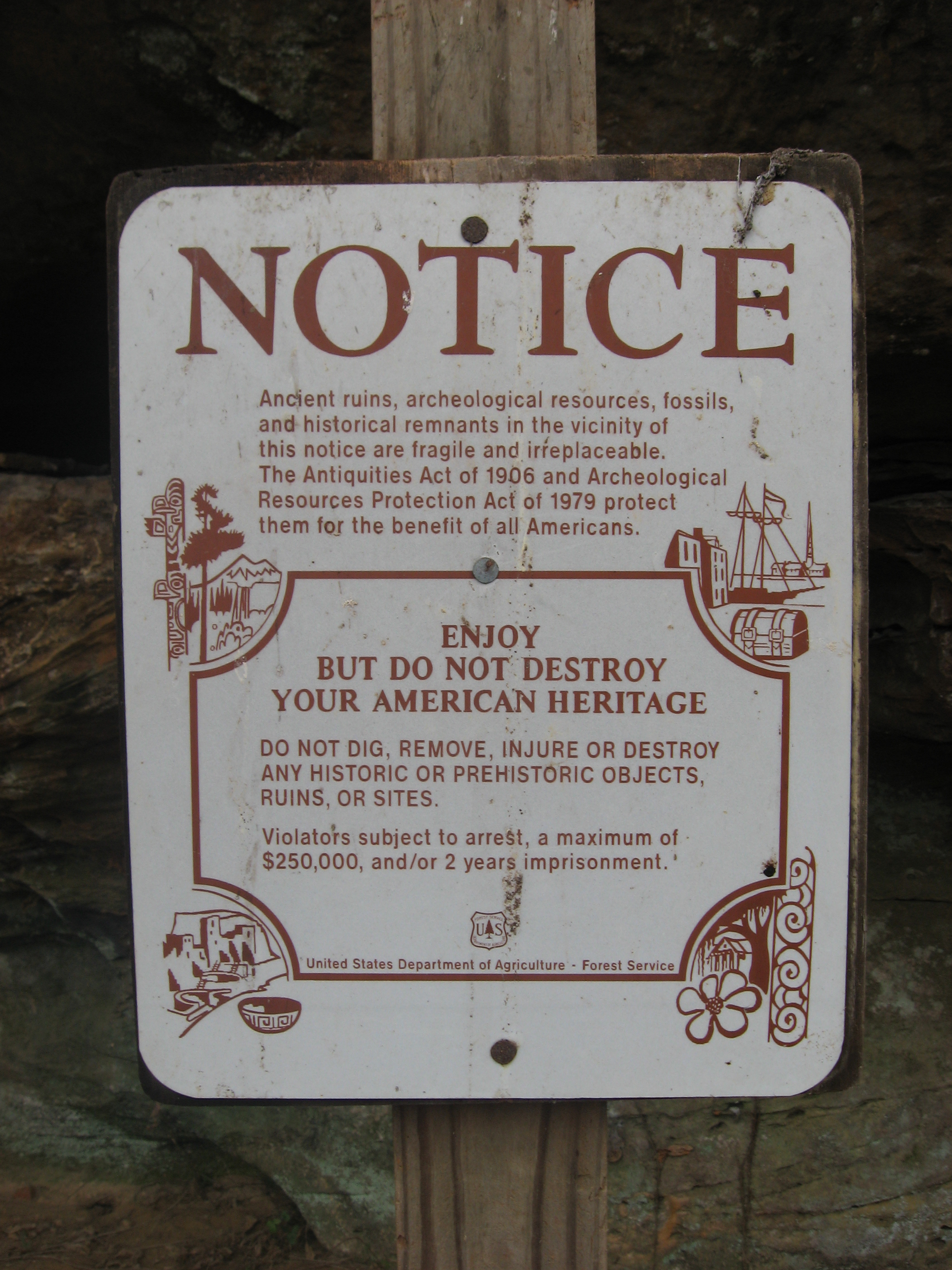
Warning sign

The shelters were listed on the National Register of Historic Places in April 1986 because of their archaeological importance; they are two of just three National Register-listed rockshelter sites in Indiana, along with the Potts Creek Rockshelter to the north in Crawford County.

== See also ==
- List of archaeological sites on the National Register of Historic Places in Indiana
