= Collier Lodge site =

- Collier Lodge Site
- U.S. National Register of Historic Places
- U.S. Historic district
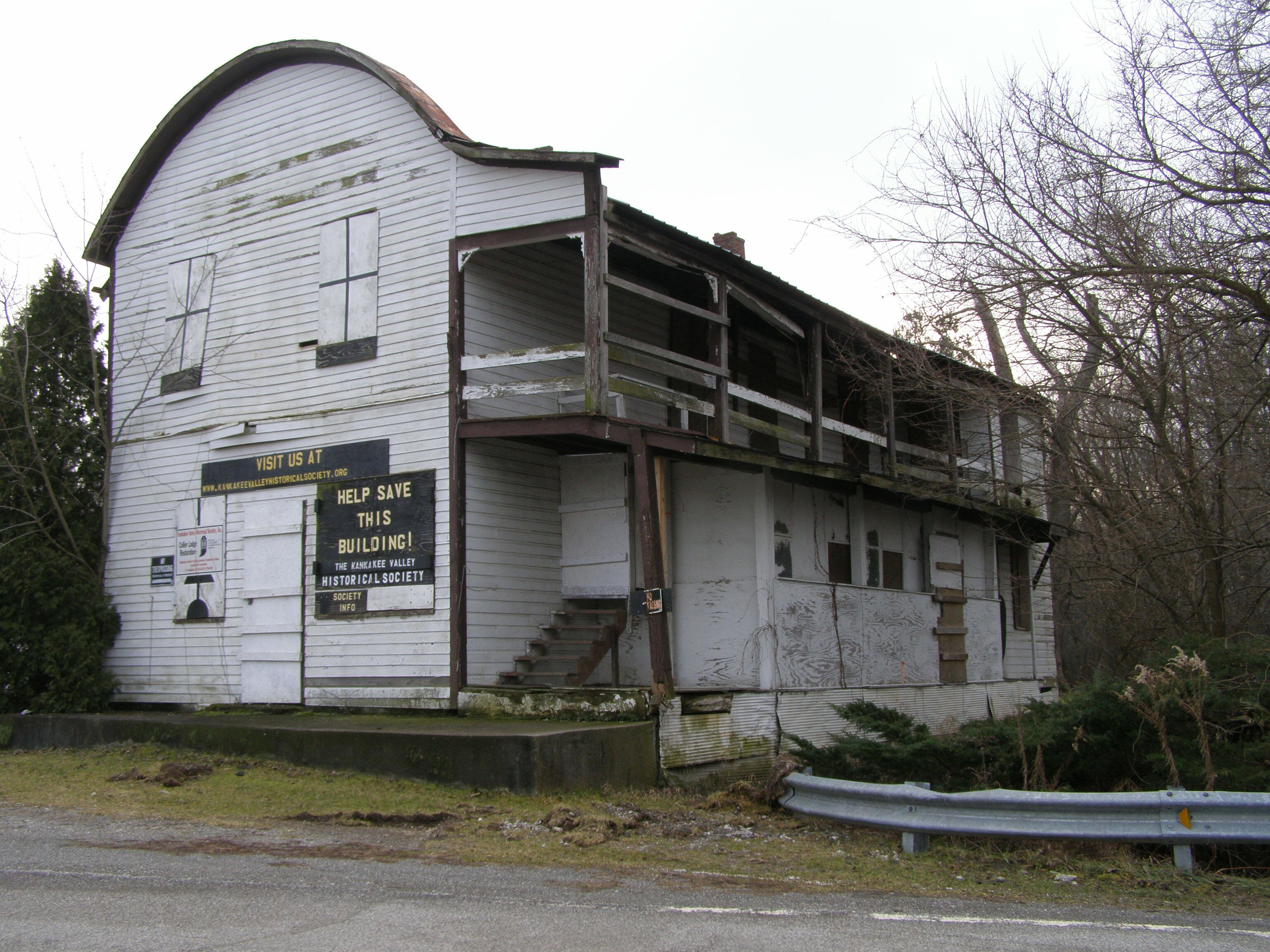
- Collier Lodge, south face from the culvert (once the bridge) over the remnant of the original Kankakee Channel

- Location within Indiana Location within the United States
- Location: 1099 Baum's Bridge Road; Kouts, Indiana
- Coordinates: 41.275384°N 87.072100°W
- Area: 1 acre (0.40 ha)
- NRHP reference No.: 09001133
- Added to NRHP: 2009

The Collier Lodge Site, located in Porter County, Indiana, is one of the few places the Kankakee Marsh could be easily crossed. The site has been occupied for over 11,000 years with evidence of human occupation from 1,000 B.C.E. Historic records of humans occupation in northwestern Indiana are available from the late seventeenth century. The prehistoric and historic cultural deposits are unique for northwestern Indiana. Prehistoric artifacts from the site represent most time periods over the last nine to ten thousand years and historic artifacts span the full range of historic occupations in northwestern Indiana. Prehistoric archaeological features documented at the site include two different types of roasting pits and small features whose functions are unknown. Historic features include the remains of a fireplace, post molds, and what is now thought to be a cellar marks the location of a previously undocumented structure. Concentrations of animal bones from the early nineteenth century indicate furs were processed at the site.

The Collier Lodge Site has been shown to contain an extremely high density of artifacts and features. The site is also the only site in northwestern Indiana that has produced the full sequence of prehistoric ceramics in the region from excavated contexts. Durable artifacts such as those made of stone, ceramics, or metal can be used to study technology, trade networks, economic status, culture contact, and the spatial distribution of different types of activities within the site and the region. Faunal and floral preservation are both excellent, so that a host of subsistence, economic, and environmental questions can be addressed.

== Setting ==
The Kankakee River valley includes sand ridges and relict channel from its path before being straightened between the years 1906 – 1917. The site rests on one of these ridges adjacent to old channel. Until 1917, the marsh supported a productive ecosystem. This dry ridge next to the river and surrounded by the marsh was attractive to human and animal life. The site is located in the Kankakee Outwash and Lacustrine Plain zone. The valley was formed by glacial melt water flowing south from the Michigan and Saginaw lobes of Wisconsin Glacier. It created a broad floodplain. The extremely flat valley became the marsh. Over a 12,000-year period, sandy soils were moved by the wind to create sand plains and sand dunes. The sandy soils are well-drained, this is well suited for human habitation. This was a high area that drained well and was adjacent to the Kankakee Marsh. The site was also situated at one of the few points where it was relatively easy to cross the Kankakee Marsh. The outwash ridges from the Valparaiso Moraine converge here from the north with another coming from the south. The crossing was known as Pottawatommie Ford {sic} and has been described as "the most historic spot along the Kankakee in the marsh proper". The site is about 1 acre (0.40 ha) and is next to the Collier Lodge building. It is on a sand ridge on the north side of the historic channel. This was a productive natural area until it was canalized. It is at the tip of a sand ridge leading from the north to the channel of the Kankakee. This forms a natural route through the wetlands.

== Occupation ==
The site was occupied from the Early Archaic (ca. 9000 B.C.) through the recent past. Prehistoric features belong to the Early Woodland (1000 – 200 B.C.), and portions of the Upper Mississippian period (A.D. 1400 – 1500). The Historic period begins in 1840 A.D. It is subdivided into the Pioneer period (A.D. 1840 – 1880), the Hunting Lodge period (late nineteenth century). The early twentieth century has identified but the period from the 1880s o is under investigation.

== Historic periods ==
Meyer (1934) defined four historic periods that could be better understood via the archaeological data from Collier Lodge. The periods were the "Pottawatomie’s Kankakee" (prior to A.D. 1840), the "Pioneer’s Kankakee" (1840–1880), the "Rancher and Recreationist’s Kankakee" (1880 -1910) and the "Reclamationist’s and Resorter’s Kankakee" (1910–1936). All of these periods are represented in the archaeological record of the Collier Lodge Site.

=== Native period (pre 1840) ===
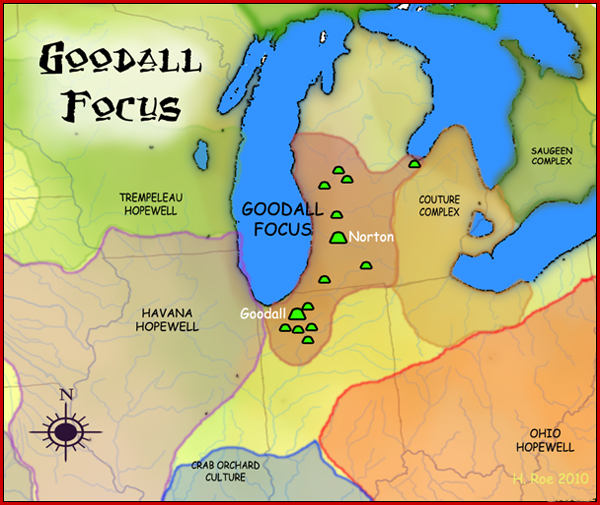
The Goodall focus (Hopewellian Culture) were Native Americans known as the Woodland period peoples that occupied western Michigan, and northern Indiana from around 200 BCE to 500 CE.

The site reflects the range of Indiana's prehistory and history, from the Early Archaic (ca. 9000 B.C.E.) to the modern era. The oldest artifacts are chipped stone tools from the Early Archaic. The site assemblage includes projectile points and other types of hafted bifaces from all periods, accompanied by many other stone tool types, along with chips were produced as stone tools were manufactured or repaired. Other artifacts include grinding stones, gorget, a birdstone, and pipe fragments. Upper Mississippian (after 1050 A.D.) pottery first found by McAllister, prehistoric pottery from the Early Woodland period (ca. 800 – 150 B.C); when pottery began in the region, Middle Woodland (ca. 150 B.C. – A.D. 350), and late Woodland (ca. A.D. 350 – 1050) periods are also present. Historic ceramics from the early nineteenth century through the recent past include fine earthenwares and coarse earthenwares or crockery. Prehistoric use of the site started when Early Archaic hunter-gatherers used the site for short periods and during limited seasons. This continued into the Early Woodland period (ca. 800 BC). Marion phase seasonal camps may have been occupied for longer periods. Artifacts show that Woodland period occupants included people of the Middle Woodland Goodall tradition (ca. 250 B.C. to A.D. 350, a regional Hopewell culture). Maize horticulture was perhaps first practiced near or on the site at that time. During the Upper Mississippian period (after A.D. 1050), people were a variety of Oneota culture making intense use of the marsh resources. An as yet unidentified Protohistoric culture probably evolved into historically known tribes during the seventeenth and eighteenth centuries. The Potawatomi are the first historically known occupants.

=== European settlers (1840–1880) ===
European settlers are represented by the remains of a cabin, domestic debris, and animal bones. The evidence points to a fur trading or trapping at site. J. Sherwood and his family became the first settlers to remain at the site, in what is Pleasant Township. In 1836 George Eaton came to what was then known as Potawatomi Ford. He built a cabin here and began the operation of Eaton's Ferry. In 1848, a bridge was built across the ford, but it burned. Eaton resumed operating the ferry until his death in 1851. Mrs. Eaton continued the ferry operation until her death in 1857. At that time, Sawyer took over the operation of the Ferry. Enos Baum built a toll bridge across the Kankakee at the site of the ford and the area has been known as Baum's Bridge ever since. The Collier family built Collier Lodge. At this time the area consisted of brushy herbaceous ground cover and oak timber. Around the dry sand islands was a thick stands of swamp timber with the marsh to the south. This would have been the same through much of the earlier occupation periods. The Kankakee River formed the western boundary. The current narrow channel adjacent to Colliers Lodge is a remnant of the river before it was straightened.

=== Ranchers and recreational period (1880–1910) ===
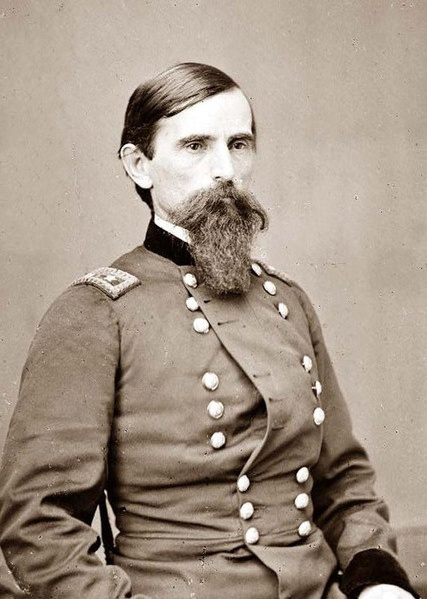
Lewis "Lew" Wallace (1827–1905)

The hunting lodges adjacent to Baum's bridge in the 1870s are the significant occupation style of late nineteenth and early twentieth century. Hunting and fishing grew into a recreational style of wealthy urban socialites in the 1870s. Local farmers and businesses developed to serve as guides and provide lodging.. The sportsmen were wealthy business and political leaders, including President Benjamin Harrison and General Lew Wallace. By the 1890s, outdoors leisure for women was increasingly accepted, particularly fishing. Near the bridge, a party of hunters, millionaires, from Pittsburgh, built a clubhouse in 1876, and called it the Pittsburgh Gun club. Additional clubs built along the river, a group of hunters from Louisville, Kentucky follows suit. In 1873, the Columbia Hunting club, a group of business men from Hebron, built on Deserter's Island. Heath & Milligan, of Chicago, bought land on School Grove Island and built Camp Milligan in 1869. Additional clubs built along the Kankakee, notably those at the Baum's Bridge crossing were: Indianapolis, Terre Haute and Rockville clubs.

The nature of sporting leisure at Baum's bridge changed along the same pattern as society. In the 1870s, hunting and fishing were exclusively male pursuits. By 1920, men and women were enjoying time along the river.

Historic artifacts have been found from this period, such as: glass containers, tableware, window glass, and buttons. Metal items include items made of aluminum, brass, copper, iron, lead, silver, and tin. Fur Trade iron and brass hardware from a variety periods has been found. Animal bones from prehistoric and historic animals reveal the range of creatures indigenous to the region (mammals, fish, birds and reptiles) and domesticates (cow, horse, pig, chicken and dog).

=== Reclamationists and resorters period (1910–1936) ===
One of the trails developed into a road providing the link between Michigan City and Logansport. The modern Baum's Bridge Road continues to follow that path. By the middle of the nineteenth century, a sawmill was operating on the river used the river as a transportation route and method for cut logs. During the last decade of the nineteenth century, the Collier Lodge building was built. A former cabin was demolished for the new building. The site continued to be used by sportsmen. After the turn of the century Collier Lodge served as a small country inn and general store. By mid-century, it was a residential property.

== Gallery ==
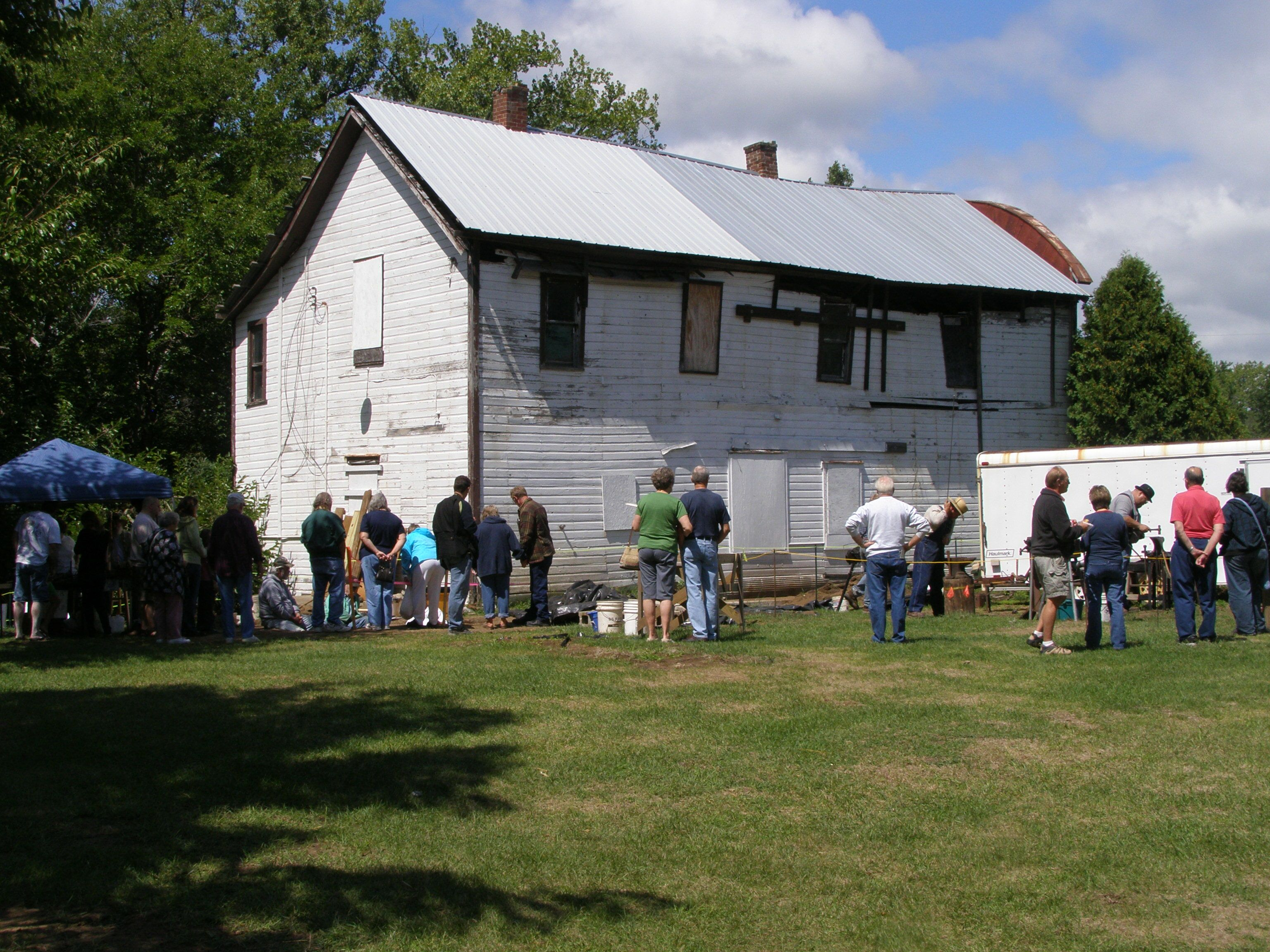
Aukiki Festival and Colliers Lodge

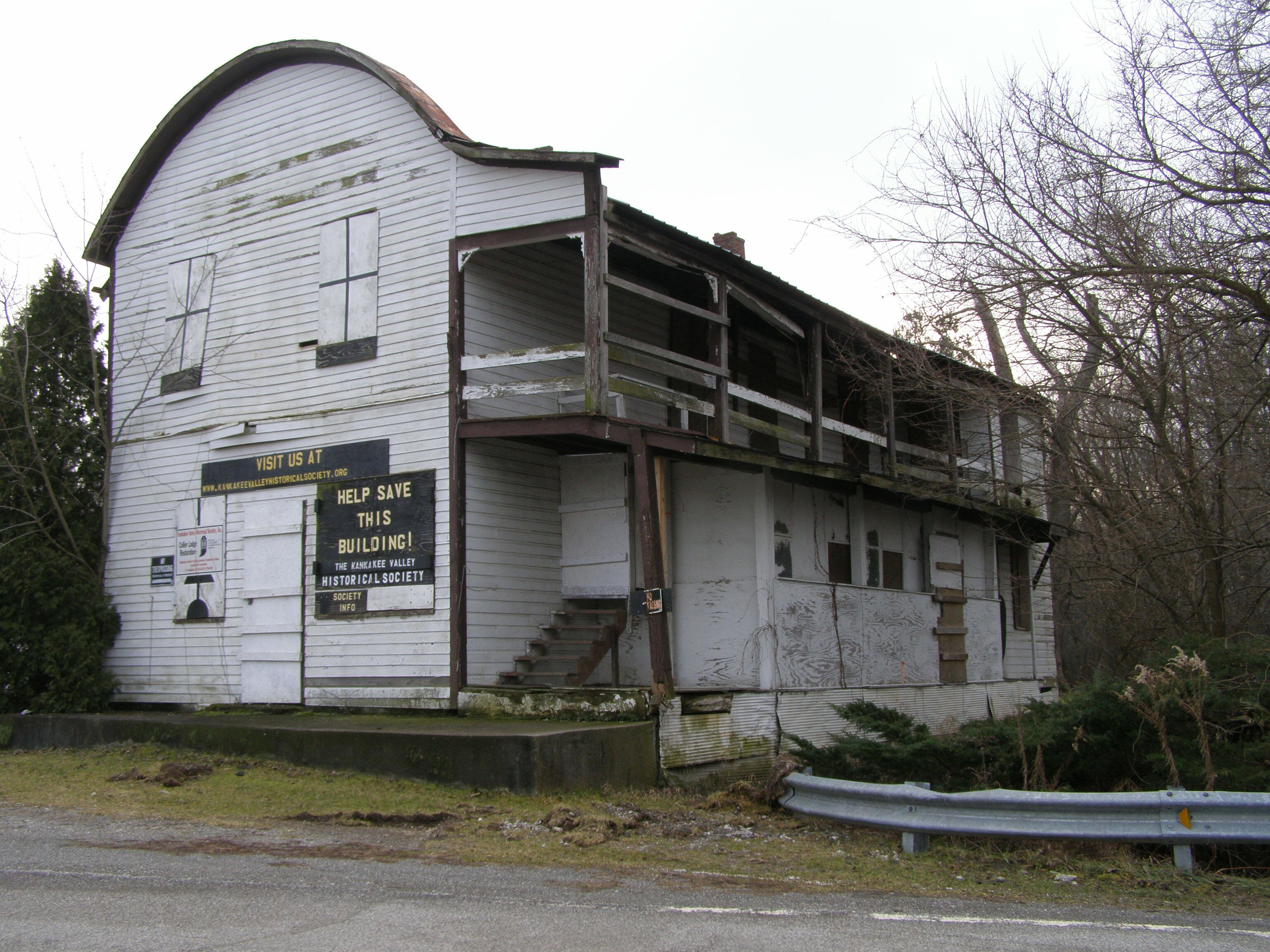
Front façade of Colliers Lodge

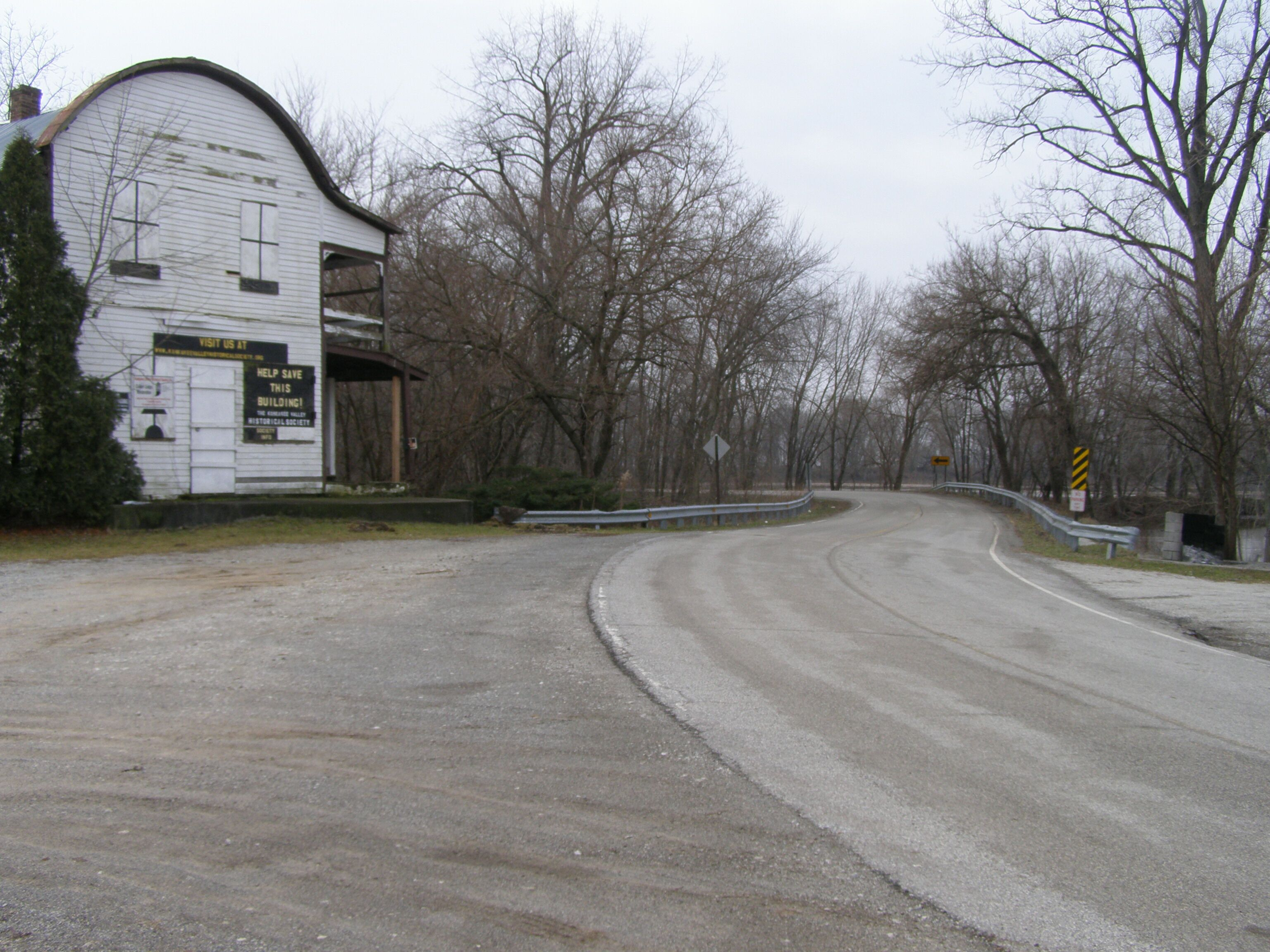
Baums Bridge Road and the original location of Baum's Bridge

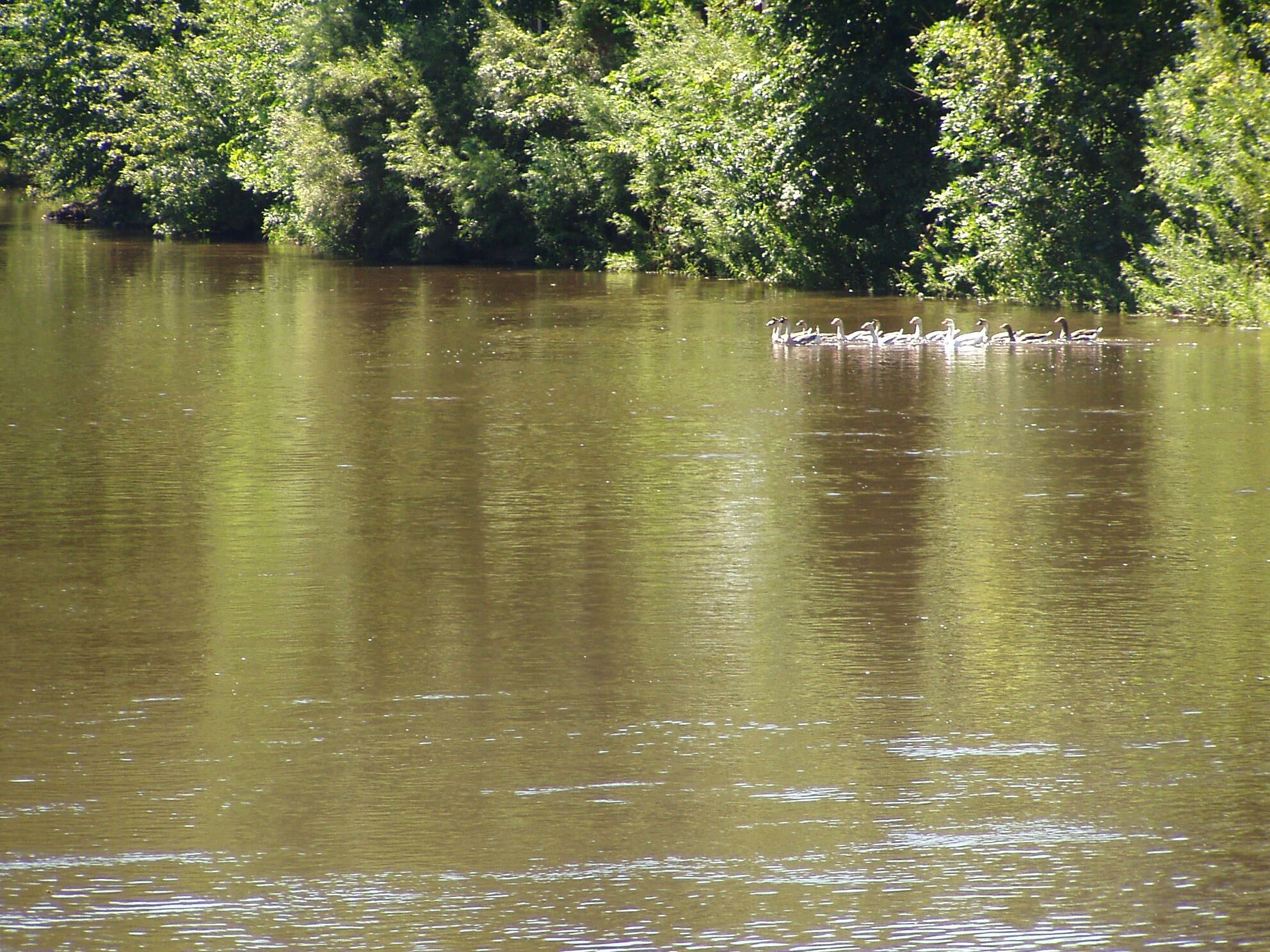
The Kankakee River in the vicinity of the Colliers Lodge Site. This is a quarter-mile south of the lodge location.

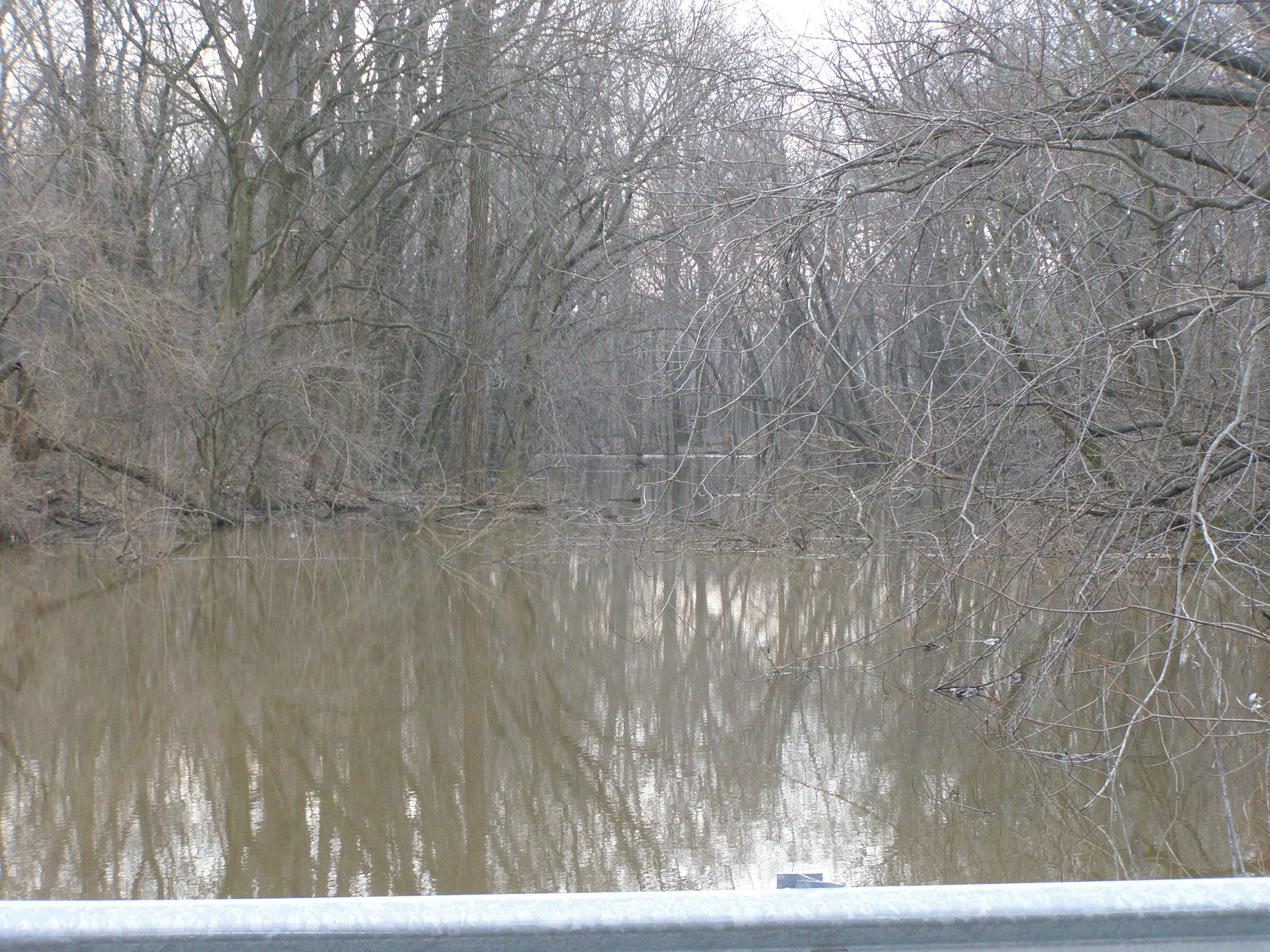
The remnant channel of the Kankakee River. Now a slack water ox bow, it once was twice as wide and the main channel of the river.

== See also ==
- List of archaeological sites on the National Register of Historic Places in Indiana

== Sources ==
- Archeology at Collier Lodge Site; Mark R. Schurr, University of Notre Dame, South Bend, IN & Kankakee Valley Historical Society; 2006
- Geophysical Surveys and Excavations at the Collier Lodge Site, (12PR36), 2010 Season; Mark R. Schurr, Department of Anthropology, University of Notre Dame, Notre Dame, IN; October 9, 2011
- Geophysical Surveys and Excavations at the Collier Lodge Site (12PR36), 2006 through 2009 Seasons; Mark R. Schurr; Department of Anthropology, University of Notre Dame; Notre Dame, IN; May 26, 2011
