= Kappa V Archaeological Site =

- Kappa V Archeological Site (12MO301)
- U.S. National Register of Historic Places
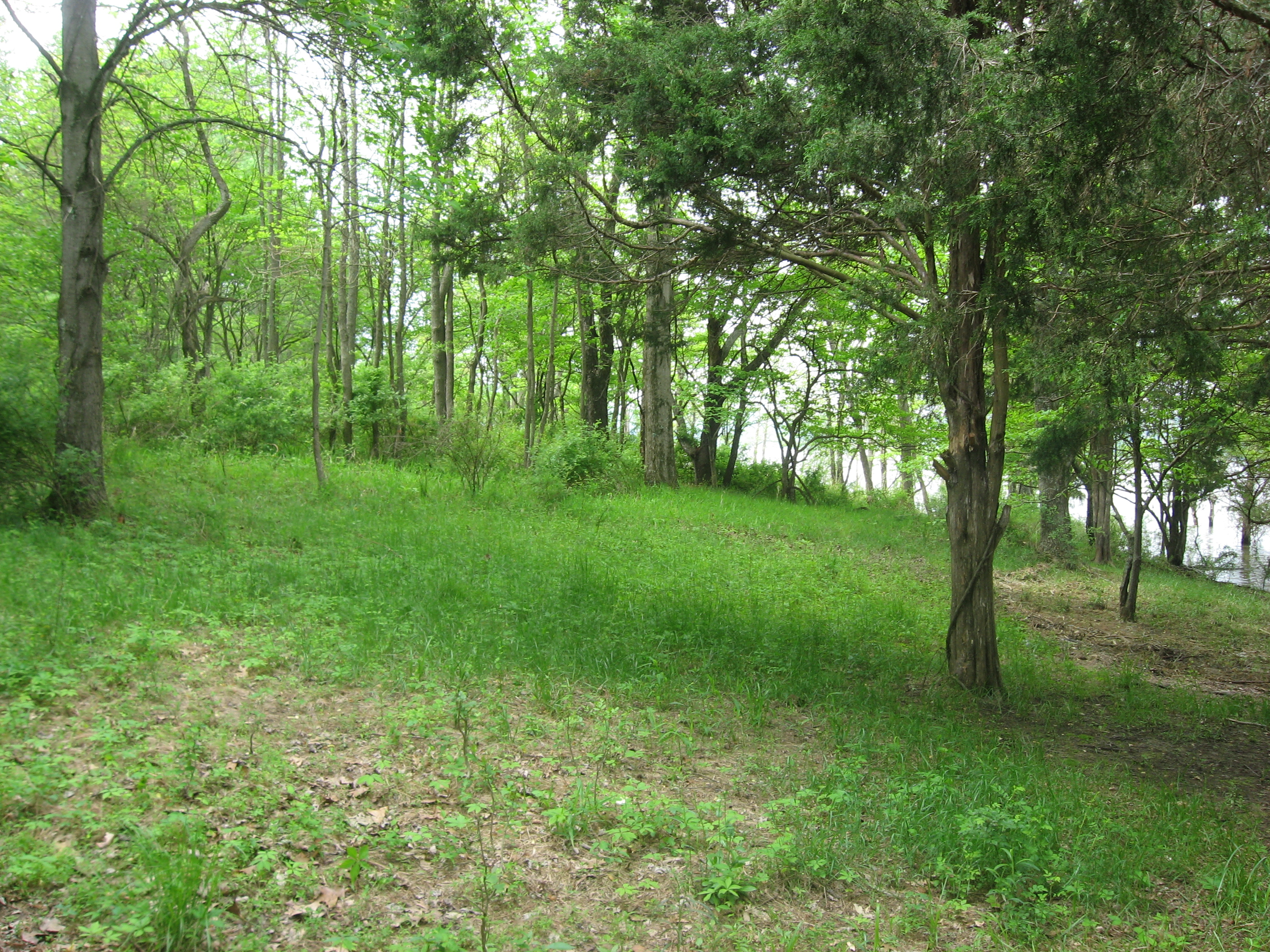
- Area: 0.3 acres (0.12 ha)
- NRHP reference No.: 86000630
- Added to NRHP: March 31, 1986

Kappa V is an important archaeological site in the southern part of the U.S. state of Indiana. Its importance qualified it for addition to the National Register of Historic Places in 1986, one week before the nearby sites known as Axsom Branch, Epsilon II, and Refuge #7.

== See also ==
- List of archaeological sites on the National Register of Historic Places in Indiana
