= Washington Township, Harrison County, Indiana =

Washington Township
- Township
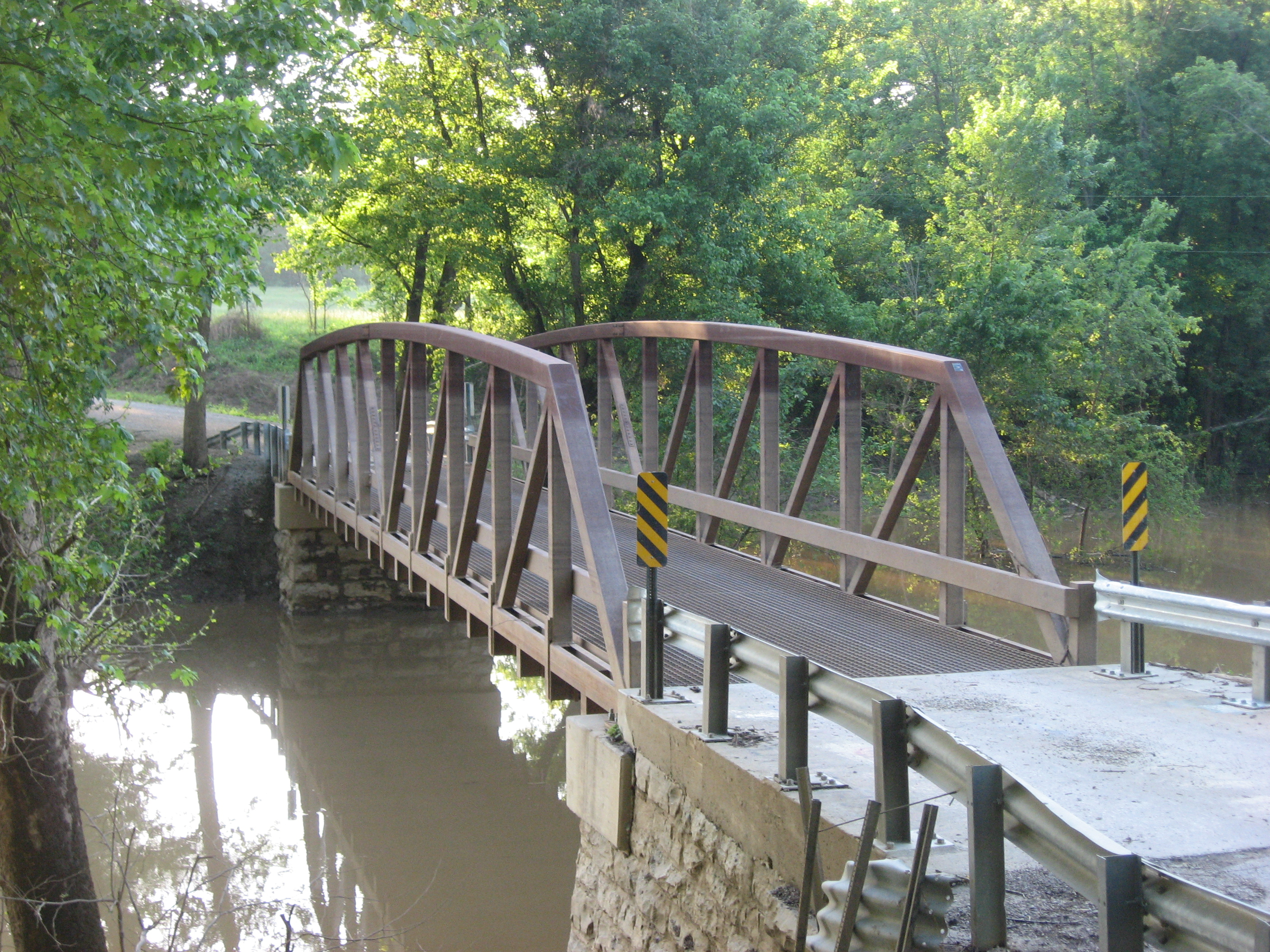
- Lickford Bridge, which spans Indian Creek in the township

- Coordinates: 38°06′37″N 86°14′29″W
- Country: United States
- State: Indiana
- County: Harrison

Government
  - Type: Indiana township

Area
  - Total: 21.09 sq mi (54.6 km^{2})
  - Land: 20.77 sq mi (53.8 km^{2})
  - Water: 0.32 sq mi (0.83 km^{2})
- Elevation: 650 ft (198 m)

Population (2020)
  - Total: 479
  - Density: 23.1/sq mi (8.90/km^{2})
- FIPS code: 18-80684
- GNIS feature ID: 453999

Washington Township is the smallest of twelve townships in Harrison County, Indiana. As of the 2020 census, its population was 479 and it contained 215 housing units.

Historical population
| Census | Pop. | Note | %± |
|---|---|---|---|
| 1890 | 1,087 | | — |
| 1900 | 1,055 | | −2.9% |
| 1910 | 985 | | −6.6% |
| 1920 | 922 | | −6.4% |
| 1930 | 717 | | −22.2% |
| 1940 | 722 | | 0.7% |
| 1950 | 520 | | −28.0% |
| 1960 | 395 | | −24.0% |
| 1970 | 377 | | −4.6% |
| 1980 | 387 | | 2.7% |
| 1990 | 392 | | 1.3% |
| 2000 | 256 | | −34.7% |
| 2010 | 522 | | 103.9% |
| 2020 | 479 | | −8.2% |
Source: US Decennial Census

== History ==
Washington Township's first settlers were Jacob and Henry Funk and their families who settled in the area in 1805. Their farm was located on the river flat where Indian Creek flows into the Ohio River.

In 1986, an early archaic Indian site was excavated in the western part of the township, the Swan's Landing Archeological Site.

== Geography ==
According to the 2010 census, the township has a total area of 21.09 square miles (54.6 km^{2}), of which 20.77 square miles (53.8 km^{2}) (or 98.48%) is land and 0.32 square miles (0.83 km^{2}) (or 1.52%) is water.

== Settlements ==
The only town in Washington Township is New Amsterdam, Indiana, located along the Ohio River. The unincorporated community of Valley City is also located there.
