= Bowen site =

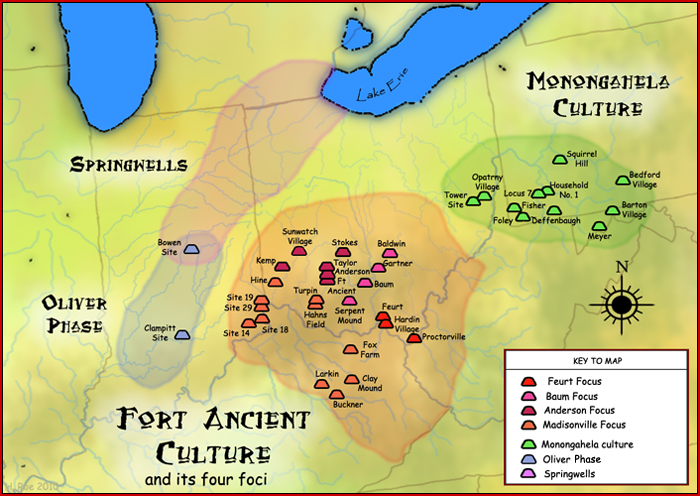
The Oliver phase and some of its major sites and neighbors

The Bowen site is the most prominent of several late Woodland Period settlements located in modern Indiana along the White River in Marion County. It is sited on a glacial out-wash terrace. The site was extensively studied and excavated beginning in 1959 when it was discovered by gravel miners. Archeologists from Indiana University who responded to the reports of the discovery completed excavation of the site in 1965.

The settlement was established circa 1000 AD and inhabited by peoples who were significantly influenced by the Mississippian culture. The village measured .78 acres (0.32 ha), and held a 200 feet (61 m) diameter burial ground that included fire and human waste pits. Pottery sherds, chipped stones, and ground bones littered the site. Also discovered were crude hammers, axes, grinding tools, antlers, and weapons made of animal bone. Evidence suggests the site was only used seasonally, and inhabitants migrated annually during colder weather to other locations before returning during the warmer times of the year.

By studying the size of the site, and the burials, archeologists estimate that the village's average population between the years 1000 and 1300 was one-hundred. The remains in several graves were disinterred for studying, and others have been examined through technology allowing archaeologists to view beneath the surface of the ground. The oldest person to be exhumed was seventy years old at his death. No young men were buried at the site, suggesting they died elsewhere and indicating the village may have been involved in prolonged warfare. The remains of several young women who died in childbirth were found. The majority of the graves were left undisturbed.

The pottery findings at the site were unique when compared to other Mississippian era. The pots were globular in shape, like those of the Mississippians, but decorated with shells and other markings like those founds among Woodland culture of the Great Lakes. Archeologists believed the pottery represented a distinct mixing of the Great Lakes and Mississippian Woodland cultures. Named after a nearby farm, the culture was named the "Oliver phase". The discoveries during the 1960s led archeologists to expand their excavation and they found similar sites both up and down stream during the 1980s and 1990s.
