= Swan's Landing Archeological Site =

- Swan's Landing Archeological Site (12HR304)
- U.S. National Register of Historic Places
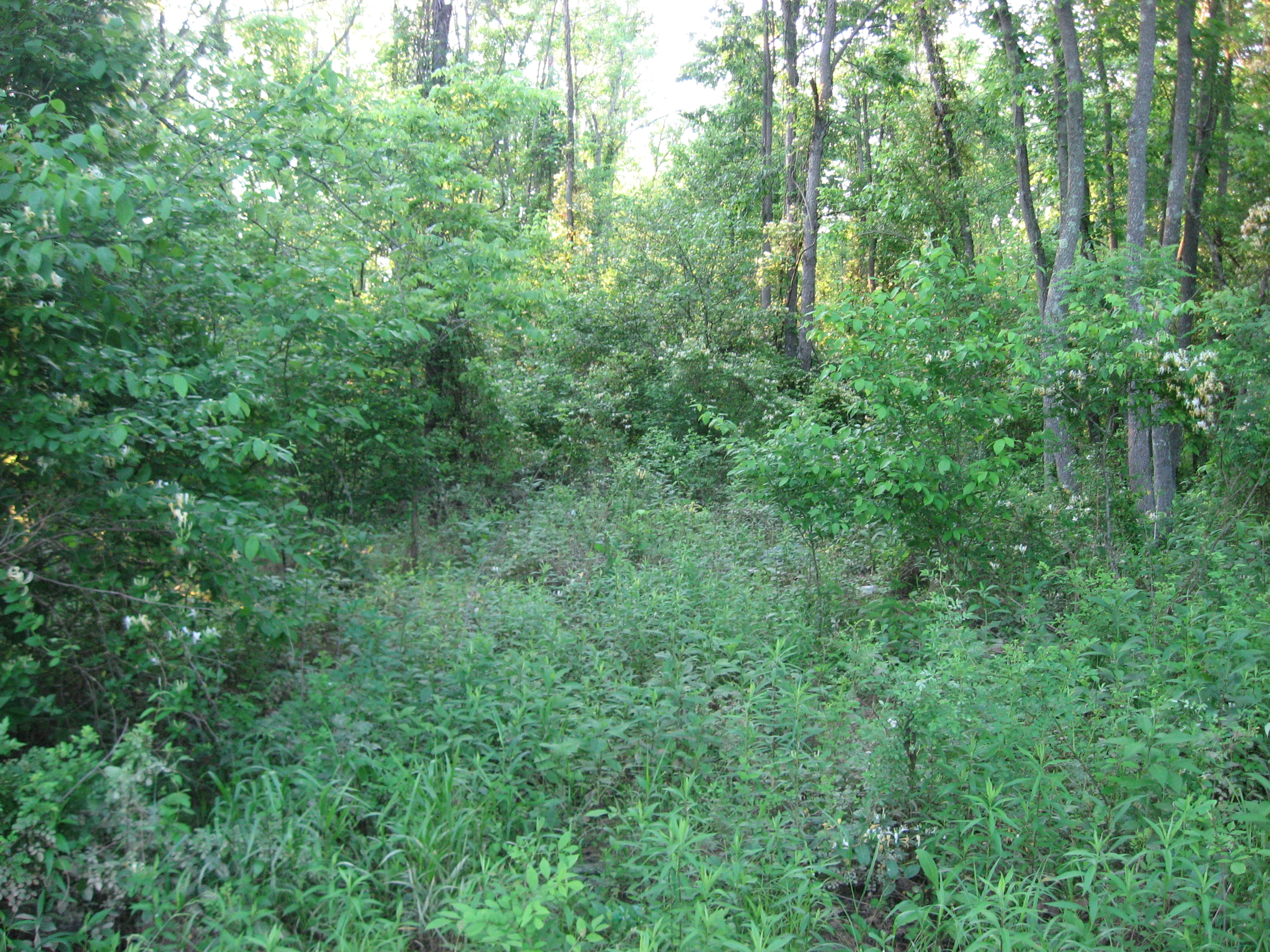
- Woods at the site

- Location within Harrison County, Indiana Location within Indiana Location within the United States
- Location: Mile 658 on the Ohio River
- Nearest city: New Amsterdam, Indiana
- Coordinates: 38°7′54.5″N 86°16′8″W
- Area: 1.4 acres (0.57 ha)
- NRHP reference No.: 87000517
- Added to NRHP: April 2, 1987

The Swan's Landing Archeological Site is an archaeological site from the Early Archaic period in Harrison County, Indiana, United States. Located along the Ohio River, it has been extensively damaged by modern activity, but it is still one of the most important sites for its time period in North America. It has been designated a historic site because of its archaeological value.

== Location ==
Located along the Ohio River, the site is largely buried by as much as 6 metres (20 ft) of alluvium deposited by the river. It sits at Mile 658 in the river's floodplain, about 3.5 kilometres (2.2 mi) north of the town of New Amsterdam, and about 6 kilometres (3.7 mi) above the confluence of the Blue River. Measuring about 5 hectares (12 acres) in area, its name is taken from the area's former use by the Swan family as a landing for riverboats along the Ohio. Nearby terrain features include a dirt road at the site's southern end, a large pond just a stone's throw to the south, and the mouth of Indian Creek about 1,800 metres (5,900 ft) south of the site.

== Damage ==
Local residents became aware of the site by the early 1960s, at which time collectors were finding projectile points on the beach; however, it was first published in 1982. Between these years, the site was greatly damaged by human activity: some intentionally, and some unintentionally. Realizing that large numbers of artifacts were buried under the soil, some individuals began to dig with shovels on the side of the alluvial deposits, while others brought high-pressure hoses to wash away the top of the deposits. By the time that professional archaeologists discovered the site in the early 1980s, extensive vandalism had removed large amounts of soil and large numbers of artifacts. Moreover, changes in 1974 to the management of the Cannelton Locks and Dam, downstream from the site, caused the water level to rise, eroding the riverbank rapidly. By the mid-1990s, the riverbank had eroded more than 20 metres (66 ft) from its previous location.

== Excavations ==
In the summer of 1986, an archaeological survey was conducted at the site to determine if the site were eligible to be listed on the National Register of Historic Places. This was done by the Glenn Black Laboratory of Archaeology at Indiana University with financing from the Indiana Department of Natural Resources.

Professional surveys in the 1980s revealed a long line of archaeological deposits that was strung out along the riverbank for at least 500 metres (1,600 ft). Types of artifacts found at the site include Kirk cluster projectile points from the Early Archaic period, various types of scrapers, hammerstones, large celts, bifaces, and many other kinds of stone tools. Most of these tools were composed of Wyandotte chert, a high-quality stone that is more plentiful in Harrison County and surrounding regions than anywhere else in the world. Charcoal was present at the site in abundance, along with multiple hearths; the lack of damage to the stones at the site has been taken as an indication that the inhabitants were capable of constructing wood fires with good aeration. Their fires were not composed exclusively of wood: evidence exists that they employed coal, oil shale, and perhaps manganese dioxide as fuel. Artifacts recovered through test excavations were subjected to radiocarbon dating, which produced a wide range of dates: because some artifacts were dated as much as eight thousand years before others, and because many dates were either too ancient or too recent for the Archaic period that produced the characteristic projectile points found at the site, it is plain that the results were flawed in some way.

== Findings ==
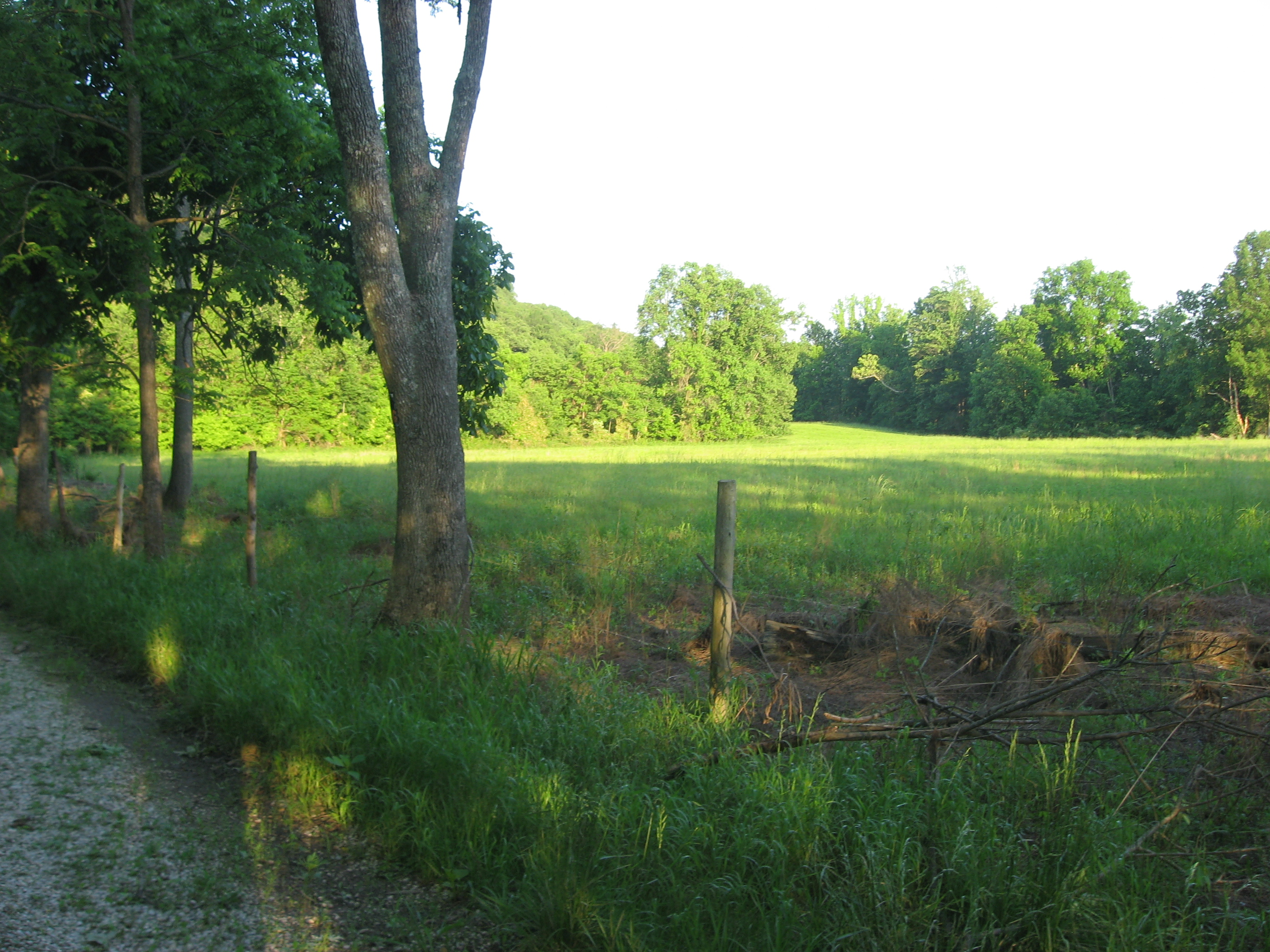
The southern edge of the site

The massive numbers of stone tools recovered at Swan's Landing indicate that the site was employed as a factory for stone tools from nearby stone outcrops. Some tools were produced at the site, and many blanks were also produced there for reduction at other locations. Because virtually all stone tools found at the site are made of local Wyandotte chert, it seems that the people who frequented the site neither travelled afar nor traded stone with other peoples. Swan's Landing appears to have been used by skilled craftsmen: the wide range of tools suggests that the workers were highly specialized. Multiple tribes may have frequented the site; one scholar has proposed that it functioned as a trading post between different peoples. With little evidence of daily life, the site may have been used typically by groups that camped there for short periods of time. The reason for the site's abandonment appears to have been that its users found nearby areas that were more appealing for their industrial purposes.

== Recognition ==
In 1987, Swan's Landing was listed on the National Register of Historic Places because of its archaeological significance. Other manufacturing and reduction sites from the Early Archaic period are known elsewhere in the country, such as the twin Houserville and Tudek Sites in central Pennsylvania, and the artifacts suggest that the people who worked at Swan's Landing were similar to those who lived at the St. Albans Site in West Virginia and Icehouse Bottom in Tennessee. Regardless of its similarities to these sites, and despite extensive vandalism, the amount of information remaining at Swan's Landing makes it one of the leading Early Archaic sites throughout eastern North America.

== See also ==
- List of archaeological sites on the National Register of Historic Places in Indiana
