= Prairie Creek Site =

- U.S. National Register of Historic Places
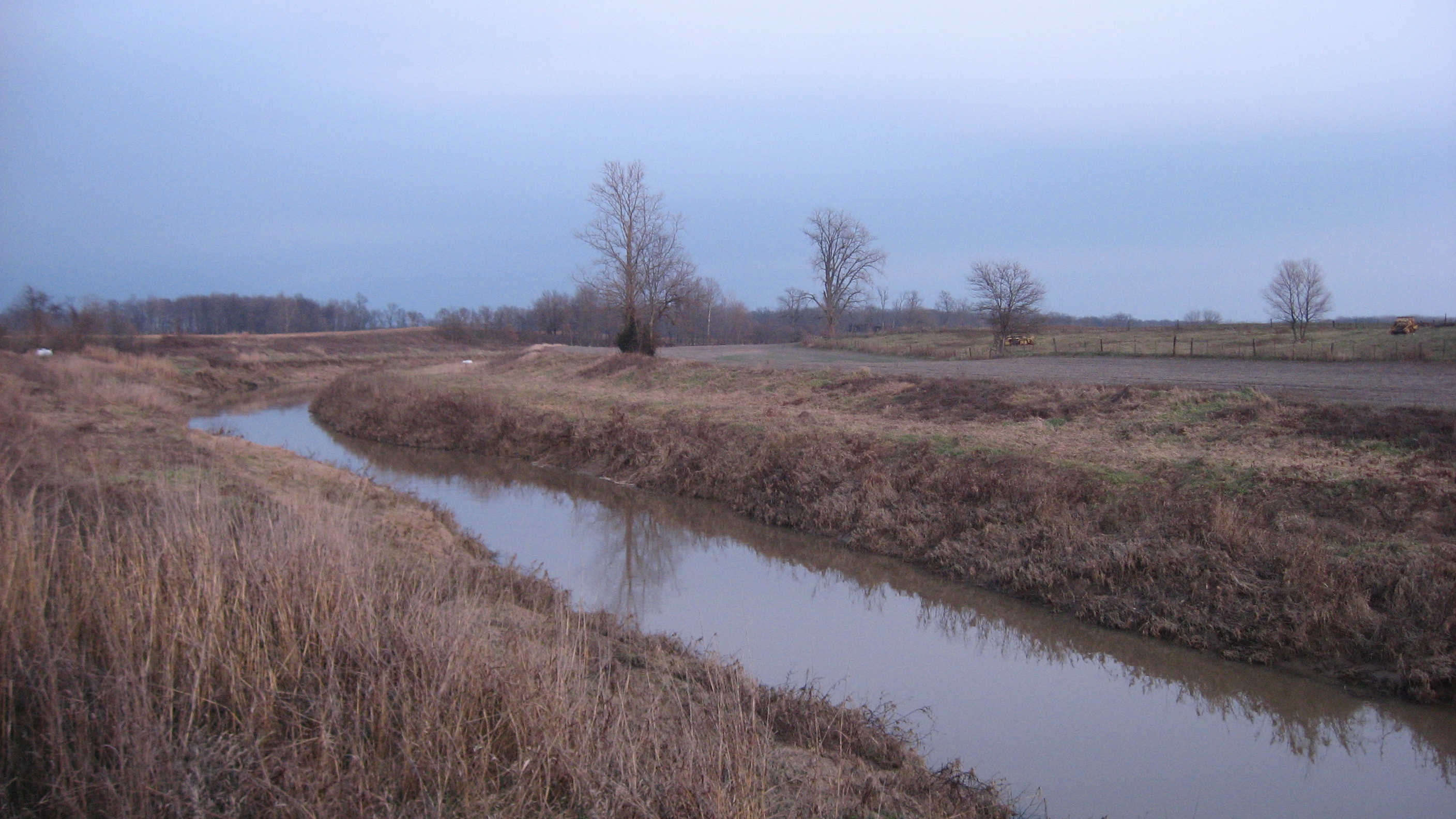
- Overview of the site

- Location within Indiana Location within the United States
- Location: Southeastern bank of Prairie Creek, 1.5 kilometres (0.93 mi) below the western edge of the Thousand Acre Woods
- Nearest city: Washington, Indiana
- Coordinates: 38°43′4″N 87°9′55″W
- Area: 30 acres (12 ha)
- NRHP reference No.: 75000013
- Added to NRHP: May 12, 1975

The Prairie Creek Site is an archaeological site in the southwestern part of the U.S. state of Indiana. Located approximately 3 miles (4.8 km) north of Washington in Daviess County, it lies along the southern bank of the westward-flowing Prairie Creek, a White River tributary. About 1 mile (1.6 km) to the east of the site, the stream leaves the Thousand Acre Woods, a heavily wooded area around a glacial lake; six miles downstream is the creek's confluence with the White River.

== Excavation ==
In early 1972, a local resident observed the bones of a mastodon along the creekside and reported the finding to the Glenn Black Laboratory of Archaeology at Indiana University Bloomington; before long, university archaeologist Curtis Tomak examined the site, removing portions of the mastodon skeleton and inspecting the stratigraphy of the site. This inspection revealed that the site was heavily stratified, due largely to stream deposits. Tomak led a test excavation at the site on weekends during the final third of 1973, which greatly clarified the stratification present at the site. Fifteen different strata were identified; all were formed mostly of clay, silt, and sand, but the majority of the material was sand. The seventh stratum from the top yielded a wide range of objects, including various stone tools and bones of multiple animal species, including extinct species of the Mylohyus and Castoroides genera. Other strata also yielded animal bones; chief among these was an armadillo shell found in Stratum 9, which at the time of discovery was the northernmost known armadillo shell.

== Findings ==
Besides the range of animal bones, many human artifacts were also found at the site. Stratum 7 yielded twenty-seven lithic flakes, bits of coal, and oxidized sandstone, as well as tree products such as burned wood from ash and maple trees. Other strata yielded fish bones, more wood, a fishhook made of bone, and significantly larger amounts of coal. Although the extinct animal bones are found in the same context as the human artifacts, this is believed to have been the result of erosion and buildup by the stream; they are not believed to be contemporaneous.

== Preservation ==
At the end of the test excavation, Tomak and his team were optimistic about the value of the site; they feared that the mixture caused by the flowing water had greatly reduced the information-yielding potential of the stream's stratigraphy, but they believed that other areas farther from the bank might be free of water damage. With excavations by the Black Laboratory continuing, the site was eventually revealed to have a Paleoindian component. Now recognized as a leading archaeological site, Prairie Creek was listed on the National Register of Historic Places in 1975.

== See also ==
- List of archaeological sites on the National Register of Historic Places in Indiana
