= Ennis Archaeological Site =

- Ennis Archaeological Site (12 OW 229)
- U.S. National Register of Historic Places
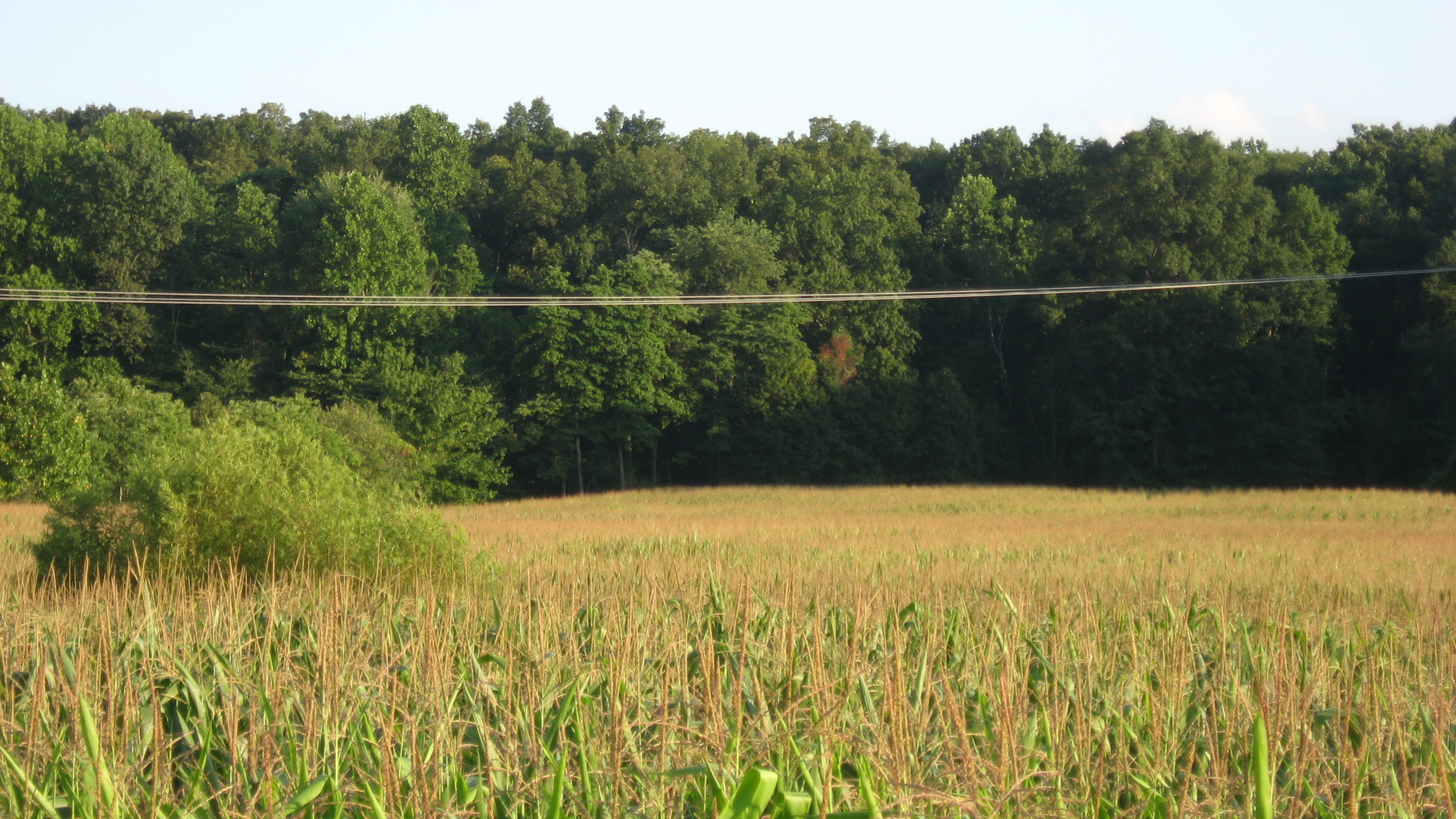

- Location within Indiana Location within the United States
- Coordinates: 39°14′19″N 86°41′03″W
- Area: 22 acres (8.9 ha)
- NRHP reference No.: 85001167
- Added to NRHP: May 30, 1985

The Ennis Site is an important archaeological site in the countryside southwest of Indianapolis in the U.S. state of Indiana. Located near the town of Ellettsville in Monroe County, the site extends into a portion of Owen County, near the town of Spencer. As an important archaeological site, it was listed on the National Register of Historic Places in mid-1985; it was the first Monroe County archaeological site and the only Owen County archaeological site to receive this distinction.

== See also ==
- List of archaeological sites on the National Register of Historic Places in Indiana
