= Clampitt Site =

Archaeological site in Lawrence County, Indiana, U.S.

The Clampitt site (12Lr329) is a prehistoric archaeological site that sits on a sandy terrace along the East Fork of the White River, southeast of Bedford in Lawrence County, Indiana. The site was excavated by the Indiana University archaeological field school in the summers of 1991 and 1992. The Clampitt site was added to the National Register of Historic Places in 2016. The site is located on private property. It is one of thirteen National Register of Historic Places listings in Lawrence County, Indiana.

== Archaeological investigations and prehistoric occupations ==
The Clampitt site shows evidence of multicomponent habitation from the Paleo Indian period through the Oliver phase in the Terminal Woodland period. The site was documented in archaeological literature beginning with the first county archaeological survey done in Indiana by E.Y. Guernsey in 1924, where he mentioned investigating the site and finding ceramic sherds and chert on the surface. Guernsey, as well as several local residents, later described finding concave-based, fluted points on or near the site.

In 1990, Indiana University began actively investigating the site. The site was named the “Clampitt site” after the owners of the site at the time. In the summers of 1991 and 1992, Indiana University conducted two field schools at the site. Evidence from the excavations suggested that the village was at least one acre in size, contained a central plaza encircled by pit features, and showed evidence of either multiple stockade enclosures or a rebuilding of one stockade enclosure. Although a large number of post molds were encountered, no definite house structures could be identified. Particularly interesting was Feature 44, which was a very large and deep post mold located on the highest point of the site. This post may have been part of a huge structure or a marker.

Analysis of the faunal and floral materials excavated from the features at the Clampitt site revealed the remains of maize, beans, wild plants, berries, nuts, deer, fish, and other animals. The assemblage of floral specimens discovered at Clampitt primarily contained a large proportion of maize. These findings suggest a population that lived at the site at least during the planting and harvesting seasons, possibly dispersing into small groups into the uplands during the winter, or perhaps remaining on the site year-round. Sparse faunal remains were found, but recovered specimens included deer, squirrel, fox, woodchuck, beaver, muskrat, turkey, duck, freshwater drum, redhorse, and turtle.

In addition to the floral and faunal remains, the excavations also recovered over ten thousand ceramic sherds. Most of the sherds from this site came from grit-tempered, globular-shaped vessels with cord-marked bodies. The neck area of the vessels was equally likely to be cord-marked or smooth, most lips of the vessels were smoothed, and most rims and necks were smooth. The most common rim decoration consisted of oblique lines created with a cord-wrapped tool. The most common neck design was made from trailed lines known as guilloche. Nearly two-thirds of the sherds recovered from Clampitt were Fort Ancient-like Oliver Cord-marked ceramics, while nearly one-third of the ceramics were of the Late Woodland Bowen Cord-marked and Bowen Collared types. These ceramic types are consistent with an Oliver phase occupation.

A small number of groundstone artifacts were excavated from the site, including one complete grinding stone. Despite the scarcity of groundstone tools, many chipped stone tools were recovered during the excavations. One Quad point from the Paleoindian period was recovered from the site, along with numerous Archaic and Woodland points, suggesting continual reoccupations of the site over thousands of years. The most common stone projectile point types were Terminal Late Archaic Riverton points of the Merom-Tremble cluster (1600–1000 B.C.), and Late Woodland Madison and other types of triangular points from the Oliver phase (A.D. 1250–1400). The triangular point assemblage from Clampitt closely resembled Fort Ancient points from the Middle Ohio River Valley, though it lacked the classic serrated Fort Ancient point type.

Radiocarbon dates placed the Oliver phase occupation of the Clampitt site in the Fourteenth Century. Specifically, the range of dates for the Clampitt site, expanded for standard errors, ranged from A.D. 1276 to A.D. 1433. This places the Clampitt site at the late end of Oliver phase habitation sites.
