= Epsilon II Archaeological Site =

- Epsilon II Archeological Site (12MO133)
- U.S. National Register of Historic Places
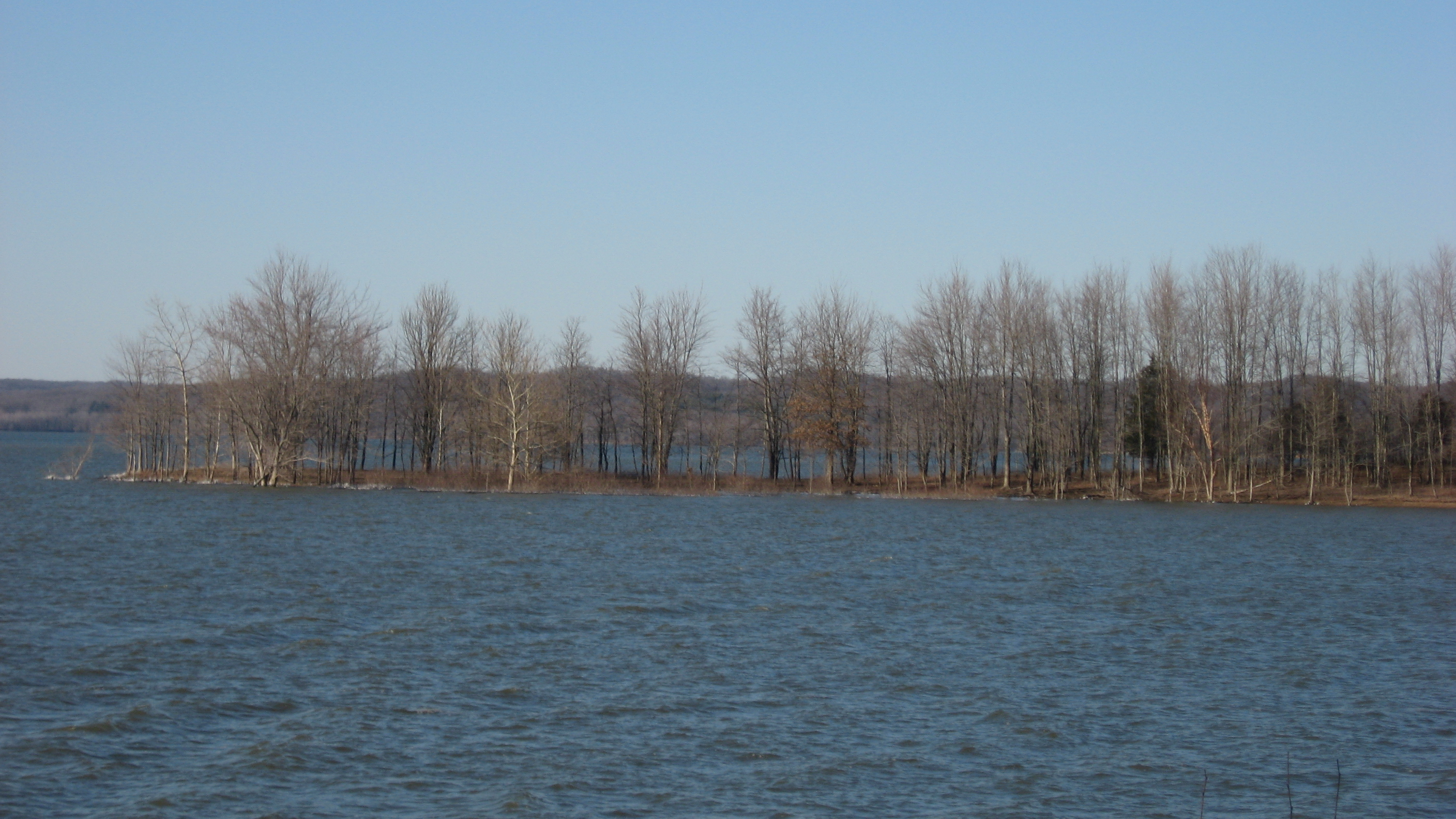
- Nearest city: Bloomington, Indiana
- Area: 2 acres (0.81 ha)
- NRHP reference No.: 86000524
- Added to NRHP: March 25, 1986

Epsilon II is a significant archaeological site on the shores of Monroe Lake in southeastern Monroe County, Indiana, United States. One of the largest preserved sites from its time period in the region, it has been designated a historic site.

More than 90% of all points from Epsilon II date from various parts of the Late Archaic, which is greater than that of any other nearby site, many of which are predominantly Early Archaic. A large proportion of points are of the "Karnak Stemmed" or "Karnak Unstemmed" varieties. Besides "Epsilon II", the site has also been known as the "Sisson Site".

On March 25, 1986, the Epsilon II Archaeological Site was listed on the National Register of Historic Places, becoming the first archaeological site in Monroe County to receive this distinction. A similar status was accorded to three other sites within a week: Axsom Branch and Refuge #7 (both of which are in Brown County) were designated on the same day, and Kappa V (also in Monroe County) followed six days later. Both Brown County sites were delisted in September 1995, but the two Monroe County sites remain on the Register to the present day.

== See also ==
- List of archaeological sites on the National Register of Historic Places in Indiana
