= Potts Creek Rockshelter =

- Potts Creek Rock Shelter Archeological Site
- U.S. National Register of Historic Places
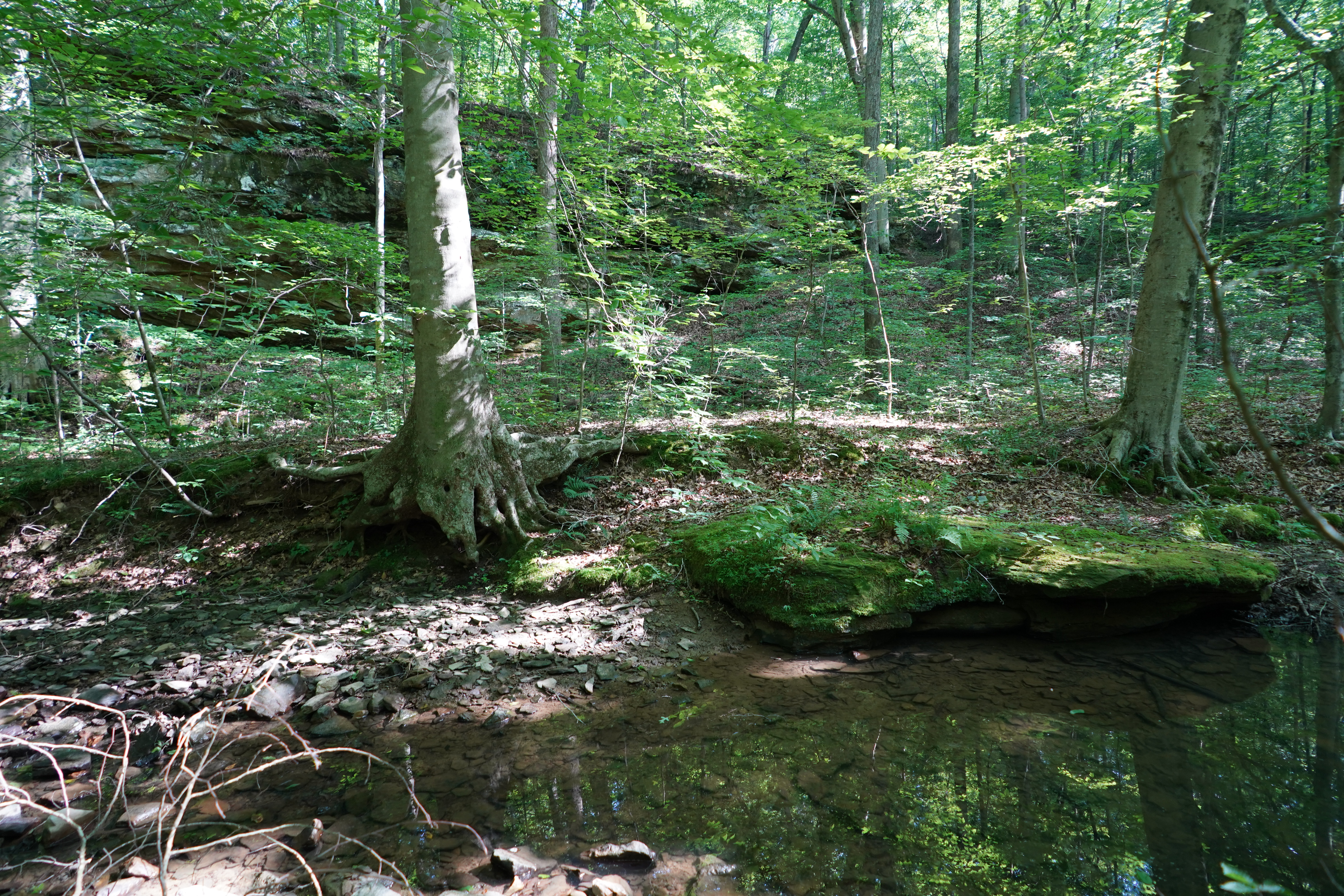
- Potts Creek Rock Shelter

- Location within Indiana Location within the United States
- Location: Southern side of State Road 62, 1.25 miles (2.01 km) east of St. Croix
- Nearest city: St. Croix, Indiana
- Coordinates: 38°13′42″N 86°33′45″W
- Area: 0.1 acres (0.040 ha)
- NRHP reference No.: 86003174
- Added to NRHP: February 4, 1987

Potts Creek Rockshelter (12CR110) is a prehistoric archaeological site in Hoosier National Forest in Crawford County, Indiana. The rockshelter was used as a campsite by Native Americans during the Paleo-Indian, Archaic, and Woodland periods.

It was listed on the National Register of Historic Places in 1987.

== See also ==
- List of archaeological sites on the National Register of Historic Places in Indiana
