= New Amsterdam, Indiana =

- Town
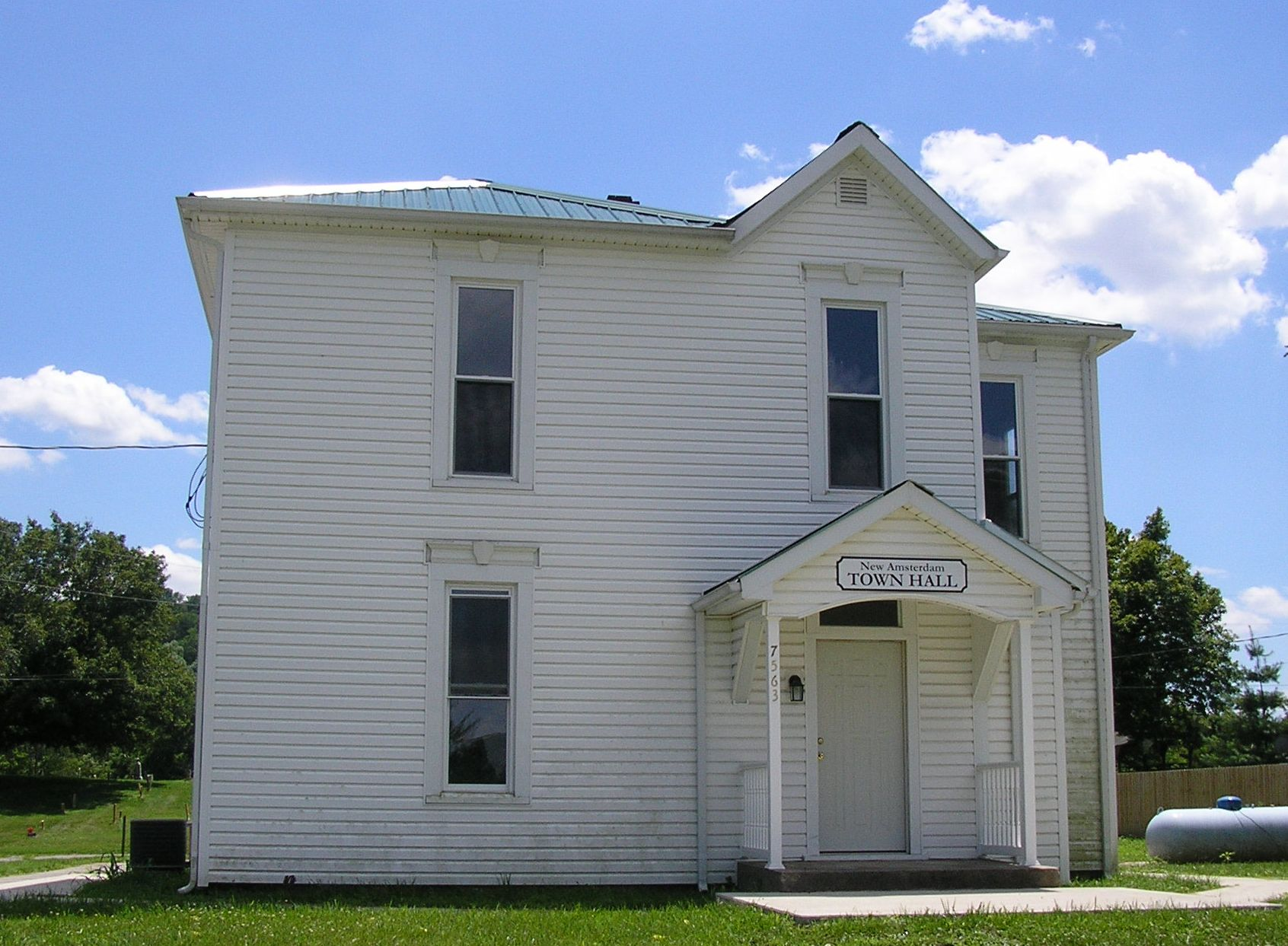
- New Amsterdam town hall, 2007

- Location of New Amsterdam in Harrison County, Indiana.
- Coordinates: 38°6′7″N 86°16′29″W
- Country: United States
- State: Indiana
- County: Harrison
- Township: Washington

Area
  - Total: 0.10 sq mi (0.26 km^{2})
  - Land: 0.077 sq mi (0.20 km^{2})
  - Water: 0.027 sq mi (0.07 km^{2})
- Elevation: 449 ft (137 m)

Population (2020)
  - Total: 12
  - Density: 158.8/sq mi (61.33/km^{2})
- Time zone: UTC-5 (Eastern (EST))
  - Summer (DST): UTC-4 (EDT)
- ZIP codes: 47142
- Area code: 812
- FIPS code: 18-52398
- GNIS feature ID: 0440016

New Amsterdam is a town located in Washington Township, Harrison County, Indiana, United States, along the Ohio River. As of the 2020 census, the city population was 12. As of the 2020 Census, New Amsterdam was the smallest city, town, or Census Designated Place in the state of Indiana. River Forest was the smallest in 2010 when it had 22, but had risen to 26. New Amsterdam officially became the smallest town in Indiana with the population being 12, down from 27 in 2010.

== History ==
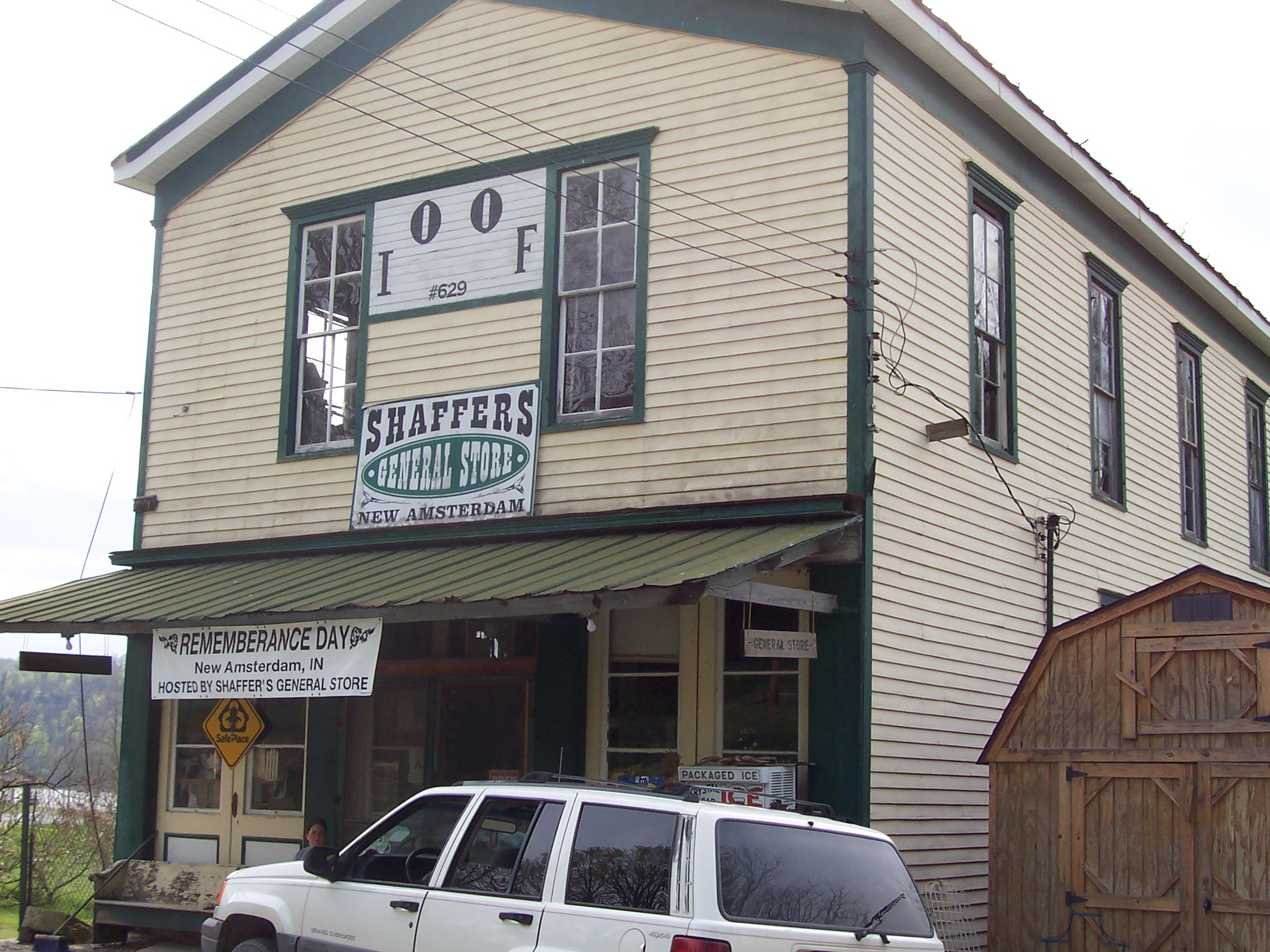
Shaffer's General Store, 2011

The first settlers in what became New Amsterdam were James Riley and Jacob Youstler. Starting in 1815, they lived in New Amsterdam for several years before relocating further north. The town was formally platted on September 19, 1815, by Jacob Funk and Samuel McAdams.

The town relied on the Ohio River for its growth, as it was the main transportation route for migrating settlers as well as traders up and down river. Steamboats were active on the river during the 19th century and contributed to the growth of waterfront towns. In the 1860 census, New Amsterdam was the largest town in Harrison County.

Floods played a large part in the decline of the town. The Great Ohio River flood of 1937 destroyed 75% of the structures in the town. The only original building remaining in the town is the old country store. A marker on the second story of the building shows the height of the water in the 1937 Flood.

Today, the town has a general store, a Baptist church, a Methodist church, a town hall and a cemetery.

== Geography ==
New Amsterdam is located at 38°6′6″N 86°16′29″W (38.101894, -86.274821). According to the 2010 census, New Amsterdam has a total area of 0.1 square miles (0.26 km^{2}), of which 0.08 square miles (0.21 km^{2}) (or 80%) is land and 0.02 square miles (0.05 km^{2}) (or 20%) is water.

== Demographics ==
Historical population
Census	Pop.	Note	%±
1880	186		—
1890	172		−7.5%
1900	200		16.3%
1910	134		−33.0%
1920	137		2.2%
1930	101		−26.3%
1940	86		−14.9%
1950	76		−11.6%
1960	43		−43.4%
1970	32		−25.6%
1980	31		−3.1%
1990	30		−3.2%
2000	24		−20.0%
2010	27		12.5%
2020	12		−55.6%
U.S. Decennial Census

=== 2020 census ===
As of the census of 2020, there were 12 people and 6 occupied housing units in the town. The population density was 150 inhabitants per square mile (57.9/km^{2}). There were 8 housing units at an average density of 100 per square mile (38.6/km^{2}). The racial makeup of the town was 91.7% White and 8% Black. The town lost a significant portion of its population between the 2010 census (27 people) and the 2020 census (12 people), surpassing River Forest as the smallest municipality in the state.

=== 2010 census ===
As of the census of 2010, there were 27 people, 11 households, and 8 families residing in the town. The population density was 337.5 inhabitants per square mile (130.3 inhabitants/km^{2}). There were 20 housing units at an average density of 250.0 per square mile (96.5/km^{2}). The racial makeup of the town was 85.2% White, 11.1% from other races, and 3.7% from two or more races. Hispanic or Latino of any race were 11.1% of the population.

There were 11 households, of which 36.4% had children under the age of 18 living with them, 54.5% were married couples living together, 18.2% had a male householder with no wife present, and 27.3% were non-families. 27.3% of all households were made up of individuals. The average household size was 2.45 and the average family size was 2.75.

The median age in the town was 42.3 years. 29.6% of residents were under the age of 18; 0% were between the ages of 18 and 24; 25.9% were from 25 to 44; 25.9% were from 45 to 64; and 18.5% were 65 years of age or older. The gender makeup of the town was 55.6% male and 44.4% female.

== Area events ==
The New Amsterdam Festival, also known as Remembrance Day, was held the third Saturday of April. The final year for the festival was 2014. New Amsterdam celebrates the 4th of July on the Saturday nearest the 4th.

== See also ==
- List of cities and towns along the Ohio River
- Ohio River flood of 1937
