= Lithic scatter =

Lithic scatter consists primarily of lithic flakes and other stone tool use remnants. Scatter occurs in surface areas that have often been disturbed by agricultural and natural events. Lithic scatters are used to study past inhabitants and are often the only evidence remaining. Lithic scatter is an indicator of Paleolithic or Mesolithic occupation. Techniques are used to evaluate the technologies that were employed and to date the scatter. Scatter can include relics from multiple historic periods.

== See also ==
- Lithic analysis
