= Pleasant Township, Porter County, Indiana =

Pleasant Township
- Township
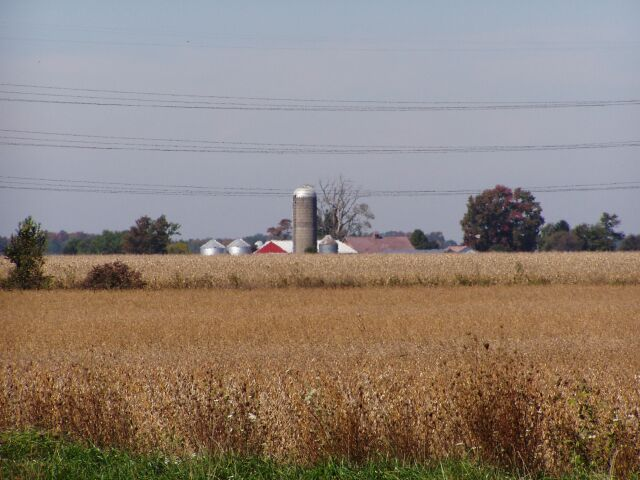
- Corn and soybeans dominate Pleasant Township

- Coordinates: 41°17′46″N 86°59′40″W
- Country: United States
- State: Indiana
- County: Porter
- Organized: 1836

Government
  - Type: Indiana township
  - Trustee: Karyl VanDyke

Area
  - Total: 56.71 sq mi (146.88 km^{2})
  - Land: 56.69 sq mi (146.83 km^{2})
  - Water: 0.015 sq mi (0.04 km^{2})
- Elevation: 666 ft (203 m)

Population (2020)
  - Total: 4,478
  - Density: 78.2/sq mi (30.18/km^{2})
- Time zone: UTC-6 (Central (CST))
  - Summer (DST): UTC-5 (CDT)
- Area code: 219
- FIPS code: 18-60426
- GNIS feature ID: 453748
- Website: pleasanttownshiptrustee.org

Pleasant Township is one of twelve townships in Porter County, Indiana. As of the 2010 census, its population was 4,432.

Historical population
Census	Pop.	Note	%±
1890	984		—
1900	1,209		22.9%
1910	1,424		17.8%
1920	1,563		9.8%
1930	1,497		−4.2%
1940	1,685		12.6%
1950	1,640		−2.7%
1960	2,031		23.8%
1970	2,462		21.2%
1980	3,172		28.8%
1990	3,266		3.0%
2000	3,759		15.1%
2010	4,432		17.9%
2020	4,478		1.0%

== History ==
Pleasant Township was organized in 1836, and named for the scenic landscapes within its borders.

The Collier Lodge site was listed on the National Register of Historic Places in 2009.

== Cities and towns ==
The township's only incorporated community is Kouts.

== Education ==
The township is served by the East Porter County School Corporation. Its high school is Kouts Middle-High School located in Kouts.

== Cemeteries ==
Name	Location	Picture	Ref pg	Ref pg
Graceland Cemetery	State Route 8, just west of Kouts		pg 54	back
Hopewell Cemetery	South Baums Bridge Road, just before SR 8			back
St. Paul's Lutheran Cemetery	State Route 8, just west of Kouts			
St. Mary's Catholic Cemetery	State Route 8, just west of Kouts			
Spencer Cemetery	South Baums Bridge Road, just before SR 8		pg 54	
