= Oliver phase =

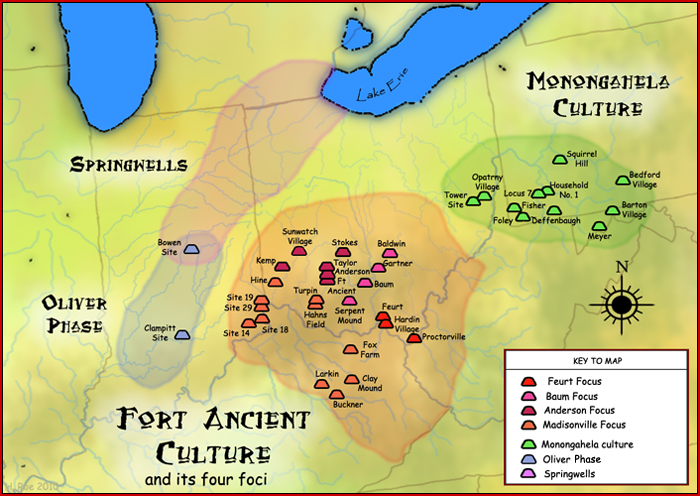
The Oliver phase and some of its major sites and neighbors

The Oliver phase was a Late Woodland Native American culture that flourished from 1200 and 1450 CE along the east and west forks of the White River in central and southern Indiana. The Oliver phase is of the Western Basin tradition which includes the Springwells phase, the Younge phase, and the Riviere au Vase phase. Oliver people were village dwelling farmers with a heavy reliance on maize, very similar to other Late Woodland peoples in the area the Oneota, Fort Ancient, and Monongahela cultures. The name was originally coined by archaeologist James B. Griffin in 1946 to describe a Late Woodland ceramic complex centered in Hamilton and Marion counties in the valley of the West Fork of the White River first extensively studied at the Bowen site.

== Archaeological record ==
=== Villages ===
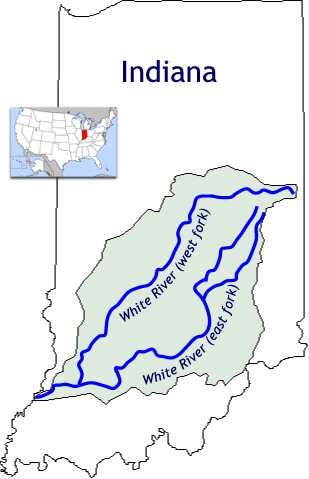
The two forks of the White River

Their villages, like their neighbors to the southeast the Fort Ancient culture, were usually circular with wooden palisades, and earthen moats found in the Whittlesey tradition, although they also lived in smaller farmsteads. Although their sites began in central Indiana, over the years they spread to the southeast. The Clampitt Site (12-Lr-329) was excavated in the summer of 1992. It was a settlement in the East Fork White River Valley, occupied by a late prehistoric to protohistoric agricultural population. Most of the settlements in this area were nucleated villages and hunting camps. The larger villages such as Clampitt (in Lawrence County) and Bowen sites (in Marion County) were roughly one to two acres in size. They intentionally located their sites on alluvial floodplains, usually a kilometer or so from tributary streams of the river, to take advantage of the richer soils there. The Bowen Site (12 MA 61) was located on the West Fork of the White River, a little to the northeast of Indianapolis, and was occupied at least twice by two similar but slightly different cultures.

=== Pottery ===
Pottery styles were originally used to determine the existence of the Oliver phase. Most items were globular, grit-tempered jars that showed a mixture of traits associated with both the Great Lakes Late Woodland Oneota and Fort Ancient cultures.

== See also ==
- Fort Ancient culture
- Caborn-Welborn culture
- Monongahela culture
- Oneota
