= Eagles Building =

Eagles Building, Eagles Hall, or Eagles Home may refer to:

in the United States

- Eagles Building (Dayton, Ohio)
- Eagles Building (Lorain, Ohio)
- Eagles Hall (San Diego, California)
- Eagles Home (Evansville, Indiana)

== See also ==
- List of Eagles buildings
