= I.O.O.F. and Barker Buildings =

- Formerly listed on the U.S. National Register of Historic Places
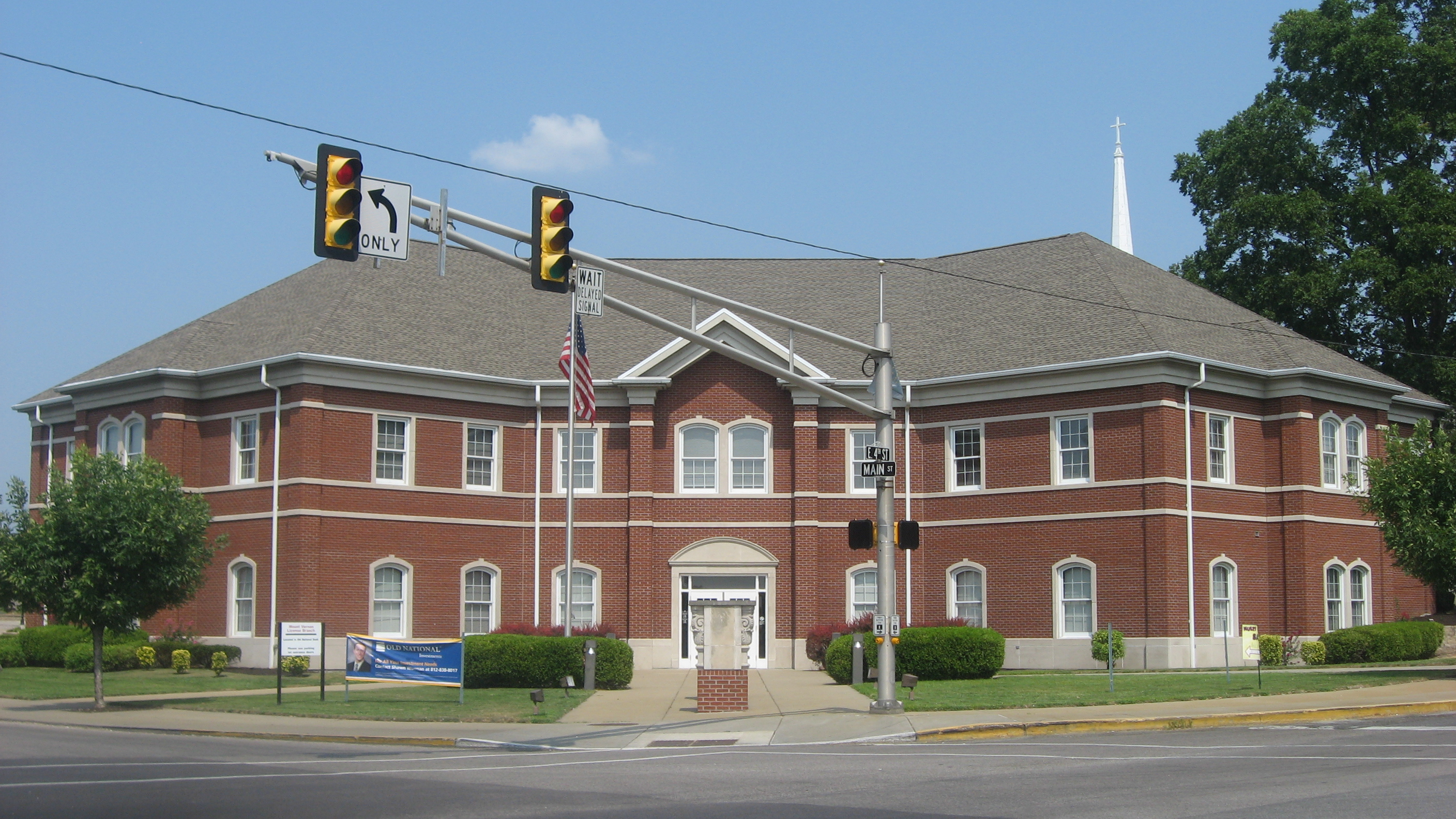
- Building on the site

- Location within Indiana Location within the United States
- Location: 402-406 Main St., Mount Vernon, Indiana
- Coordinates: 37°55′56″N 87°53′44″W
- Area: Less than 1 acre (0.40 ha)
- Built: 1898
- Architect: William A. McGregor
- Architectural style: Italianate, Romanesque Revival
- NRHP reference No.: 85002133

Significant dates
- Added to NRHP: September 12, 1985
- Removed from NRHP: December 15, 2011

The I.O.O.F. and Barker Buildings were a pair of historic commercial buildings located in downtown Mount Vernon, Indiana, United States. Constructed at the end of the nineteenth century, the two were once prominent examples of Victorian architecture in the city.

== Architecture ==
The I.O.O.F. and Barker Buildings were architecturally similar: both were brick buildings with stone trim, and both featured significant Italianate elements, seen most distinctively in their cornices. Few elements of other styles were apparent on the Barker Building, but the I.O.O.F. Building featured the prominent and large rounded window arches common to the Romanesque Revival style. However, the two were easily distinguished by their sizes: the I.O.O.F. was three and a half stories tall with a four-story tower on the corner, and eight bays wide, while the Barker comprised just two stories, and it was only three bays wide.

The front of the I.O.O.F. was largely glass: all the bays featured large windows except for the doorway, which was itself illuminated by a transom light, multiple sidelights, and glass panelling in the door itself. Topping each bay were large windows with massive Romanesque Revival arches, which were sometimes seen as creating the appearance of an arcade; the windows of lower floors varied from narrow slits on the southernmost bays of the first floor to large windows with stone lintels in all bays of the second story. Crowning the building was a fourth-story tower, which sat above the front corner: built with a stone cap and stone corners, similar to the pilasters of the first story, it featured a very un-Romanesque ornamental balustrade.

== History ==
As the city's oldest fraternal organization, the lodge of the Independent Order of Odd Fellows is one of Mount Vernon's most prominent civic groups. By the late 1890s, the lodge was sufficiently wealthy to purchase land near the county courthouse in downtown Mount Vernon and to erect a substantial commercial building on the site. The resulting structure was not used exclusively for fraternal purposes: local businesses and offices used the first and second stories respectively, and the Odd Fellows retained only the third floor for their meetings.

Eight years before the construction of the I.O.O.F. Building, Hiram Barker purchased an adjacent lot, but he did nothing with it for several years; around the same time that the Odd Fellows were building their new lodge, he too arranged for the construction of a building. For many years, the primary occupants of the Barker Building were various attorneys, while the leading tenant of the I.O.O.F. building was the People's Bank and Trust Company. At the time of its founding in 1907, it was one of three banks in the city, but mergers ultimately led to the amalgamation of both other firms under the People's Bank.

As Mount Vernon's only bank, the People's Bank began running out of room in the mid-20th century. Finding the Barker Building for sale, the bank purchased it in 1967 and modified the two buildings by removing the walls that separated them, allowing the bank's main lobby to be a single room inside both buildings. Besides this modification, the two buildings remained much as they had been constructed into the late years of the 20th century.

== Recent history ==
Due to the physical merger of the two buildings by People's Bank, architectural historians deemed the Barker and I.O.O.F. Buildings to have become one bank. Because of their historically significant architecture and the lack of changes (other than the physical merger) to the building(s) since construction, they were listed together on the National Register of Historic Places in late 1985. Besides their historically important architecture, the two buildings also qualified for inclusion on the National Register because of their leading place in local history.

Despite their historic designation, the Barker and I.O.O.F. Buildings are no longer standing; the prosperity of the downtown business district led the bank that owned the buildings to destroy them in the 1990s and to erect a new bank building on the site. In 2003, much of downtown Mount Vernon was designated a historic district and listed on the National Register as the Mount Vernon Downtown Historic District. The site of the I.O.O.F. and Barker Buildings was included within the boundaries of the district, but due to the recent age of the new building on the site, it was deemed a non-contributing property. Despite their destruction, the Barker and I.O.O.F. Buildings remained on the National Register for more than a decade, like the surrounding downtown neighborhood and the courthouse square across the street. They were finally removed from the National Register on December 15, 2011.
