= List of Fraternal Order of Eagles buildings =

This is a list of notable buildings of the Fraternal Order of Eagles. The Eagles have a significant built legacy in a number of cities and towns across the United States. The Eagles were founded in Seattle, Washington.

in the United States

(by state then city or town)

	Building	Image	Dates	Location	City, State	Description
1	Eagles Hall (San Diego, California)		1917 built 1934 renovation1985 NRHP-listed	733 Eighth Ave. 32°42′47″N 117°9′21″W	San Diego, California	Major renovation in 1934 gave work to impoverished Eagles members in a WPA-like, but private, effort. Classical Revival architecture
2	Eagles Home (Evansville, Indiana)		1912 built 1982 NRHP-listed	221 NW 5th St. 37°58′27″N 87°34′18″W	Evansville, Indiana	NRHP-listed
3	Eagles Home (Mount Vernon, Indiana)		1917 built 2003 NRHP-CP-listed	109 W. Water St. 37.92940°N 87.89501°W	Mount Vernon, Indiana	Eagles Aerie 1717 founded 1907. Has restaurant open to public. Contributing property in Mount Vernon Downtown Historic District.
4	Eagles Temple (Akron, Ohio)		1918 built 1982 NRHP-listed	131-137 E. Market St. 41°5′3″N 81°30′47″W	Akron, Ohio	Art Deco architecture, demolished
5	Eagles Building-Strand Theater, Alliance, Ohio		1921 built 1997 NRHP-listed	243 E. Main St. 40°55′18″N 81°6′10″W	Alliance, Ohio	Renaissance architecture
6	Eagles' Temple (Canton, Ohio)		1927 built 1982 NRHP-listed	601 S. Market St. 40°47′41″N 81°22′32″W	Canton, Ohio	Spanish Colonial Revival architecture
7	Eagles Building (Dayton, Ohio)		1916 built 1982 NRHP-listed	320 South Main St. 39°45′17″N 84°11′24″W	Dayton, Ohio	Prairie School architecture, Renaissance architecture
8	Eagles Building (Salt Lake City)		2019 NRHP-listed	404 South West Temple Street; 40°45′37″N 111°53′38″W	Salt Lake City, Utah	
9	Fraternal Order of Eagles Building (Richmond, Virginia)		1914 built 2006_ NP-listed	220 E. Marshall St. 37°32′49″N 77°26′20″W	Richmond, Virginia	Colonial Revival architecture
10	Fraternal Order of Eagles (FOE) Aerie No. 2059		1895 built 1999 NRHP-listed	3940 Tolt Ave. 47°38′39″N 121°54′51″W	Carnation, Washington	NRHP-listed
11	Eagles Auditorium Building		1924-25 built 1983 NRHP-listed	1416 7th Avenue; 47°36′39″N 122°19′56.7″W	Seattle, Washington	Elaborately terracotta-covered Renaissance Revival architecture historic theatre and apartment building, home to ACT Theatre since 1996 with two stages, a cabaret, and 44 residential apartments. The building was Aerie No. 1 of the Fraternal Order of Eagles (which was founded in Seattle).
12	Eagles Lodge Building		1927 built	13-15 S. Mission St.	Wenatchee, Washington	Art Moderne. Included in Downtown Wenatchee Historic District.
13	Eagles Club		1924 built 1986 NRHP-listed	2401 W. Wisconsin Ave; 43°2′17.6″N 87°56′35.49″W	Milwaukee, Wisconsin	Late 19th and 20th Century Revivals architecture
