= Welbourn (surname) =

Welbourn is an English surname. Notable people with the surname include:

- Donald Welbourn (1916–2009), English engineer
- Graham Welbourn (born 1961), Canadian swimmer
- John Welbourn (born 1976), American football player
- John William Welbourn (1900–1965), Canadian farmer and politician
- Richard Burkewood Welbourn (1919–2005), English scientist, academic and writer
- Robert Welbourn (born 1987), English Paralympic swimmer

== See also ==
- Welbourne
