= Welborn =

Welborn may refer to:

== People ==
=== As a surname ===
- Amy Welborn (born 1960), American Roman Catholic author, columnist, activist, academic and public speaker
- Bob Welborn (1928–1997), American NASCAR Grand National (now Cup Series) driver
- Ira C. Welborn (1874–1956), American recipient of the Medal of Honor
- Jason Welborn (born 1986), British boxer
- Jeffrey Welborn (active from 2012), U.S. politician in the state of Montana
- Jerry Welborn (born 1932), American sprint canoer who competed in 1972 Summer Olympics
- John Welborn (representative) (1857–1907), U.S. Representative for Missouri
- John Welborn (born 1970), Australian rugby union player

=== As a personal name ===
- H. Welborn Ayres (1900–1985), judge in the U.S. state of Louisiana
- C. Welborn Daniel (1926–2016) American politician, attorney and judge in the state of Florida
- Welborn G. Dolvin (1916–1991), American soldier
- Welborn Griffith (1901–1944), American soldier
- Welborn C. Wood (1876–1899), American naval officer

== Places ==
- Welborn Village Archeological Site, an archaeological site of the Caborn-Welborn culture, in Indiana, US
- Welborn Historic District, Mount Vernon, Indiana, US

=== Facilities and structures ===
- F. W. Welborn House, a building in the U.S. state of South Carolina
- John Henry Welborn House, a now-demolished historic home located at Lexington, Davidson County, North Carolina
- Welborn-Ross House, Princeton, Indiana, U.S.

== See also ==
- Caborn-Welborn culture, a prehistoric North American culture
- USS Welborn C. Wood, a Clemson-class destroyer in the U.S. Navy during World War II
- Welborn 'Doc' Barton House, Ingalls, Kansas, U.S.
- Welbourne (surname)
- Wellborn (disambiguation)
- Welbourn (disambiguation)
- Welburn (disambiguation)
