= Welbourn (disambiguation) =

Welbourn is a village in Lincolnshire, England.

Welbourn may also refer to:

- Welbourn, New Zealand, suburb of New Plymouth, New Zealand
- Welbourn (surname)

== See also ==
- Welburn (disambiguation)
- Wellborn (disambiguation)
- Welborn (disambiguation)
- Welbourne (surname)
- Bourne (disambiguation)
- Well (disambiguation)
