= Delcam =

Software company

Delcam Ltd
- Industry: Computer-aided design, Computer-aided manufacturing
- Founded: 1965 (as a team within Cambridge University Engineering Department); 1989 (as Delcam International)
- Headquarters: Birmingham, England, UK
- Area served: Worldwide
- Key people: Pete Baxter (Vice President) Ed Lambourne (Technical Director); Kulwant Singh (Finance Director); Bart Simpson (Commercial Director) Steve Hobbs (Development Director)
- Products: Engineering Software, Turnkey cells
- Services: Maintenance, Bespoke solutions
- Website: www.delcam.com

Delcam is a supplier of advanced CAD/CAM software for the manufacturing industry. The company has grown steadily since being founded formally in 1977, after initial development work at Cambridge University, UK. It is now a global developer of product design and manufacturing software, with subsidiaries and joint ventures in North America, South America, Europe and Asia with a total staff of over 800 people and local support provided from over 300 re-seller offices worldwide. It was listed on the London Stock Exchange until 6 February 2014, when it was acquired by Autodesk. It now operates as a wholly owned, independently operated subsidiary of Autodesk.

== History ==
=== Overview ===
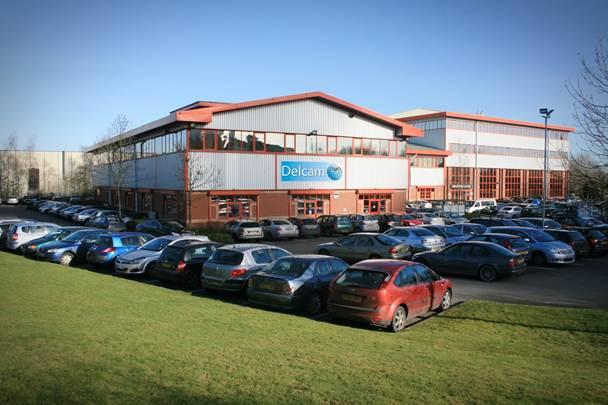
Headquarters of Delcam Ltd. in Birmingham

In 1965, Donald Welbourn saw the possibility of using computers to help pattern makers solve the problems of modelling difficult 3D shapes. He persuaded the Science Research Council to support research at the Cambridge University Engineering Department. Early sponsorship was provided by Ford and Control Data in Germany, whose customers included Volkswagen and Daimler-Benz. In 1974 the Delta Group seconded Ed Lambourne (later the Technical Director at Delcam) to the Cambridge Team. After Lambourne returned to Delta, a Birmingham-based development centre was established in 1977.

In 1989, the company was bought from Delta Group in a buyout led by Managing Director Hugh Humphreys and Ed Lambourne. The company was renamed Delcam International in 1991 and moved to a new purpose-built office in Small Heath. In July 1997, Delcam Ltd was floated on the Alternative Investment Market to expand international operations and increase the investment in software development.

The company now have over 300 offices assisting 90,000 users worldwide with an annual turnover of over £100 million with the largest development team in the industry. Clive Martell became chief executive from August 2009. In February 2015, Pete Baxter, former vice president of sales and country manager for Autodesk in the UK, was appointed vice president.

=== Key Dates ===
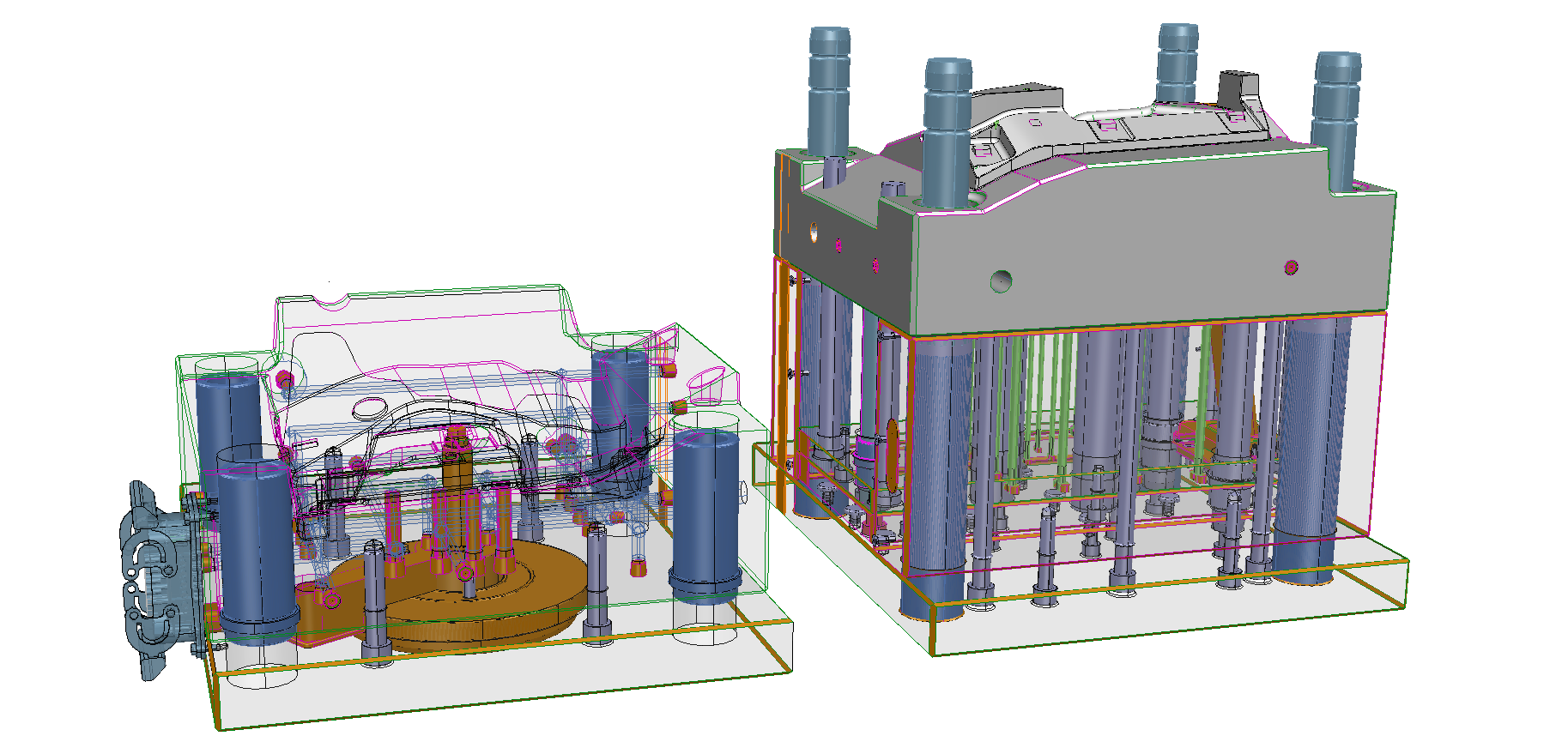
3D model of a mould from PowerSHAPE

1960s
Initial research at Cambridge University

1970s
Development taken over by Delta Group

1980s
Software sales start

1989
Staff purchase company

1991
New HQ, Birmingham, UK

1997
Delcam floats on UK Market

2001
Alcami Joins Delcam

2005
EGS (FeatureCAM) joins Delcam

2006
IMCS (PartMaker) joins Delcam

2007
Crispin joins Delcam

2008
25,000th Customer

2009
30,000th Customer

2010
35,000th Customer

2012
40,000th Customer

2013
45,000th Customer

2014
Acquired by Autodesk

2015
50,000th Customer

2017
ArtCAM Announced End of development / End of support The ArtCAM code was then licensed to the company Carveco who re-branded the software and continue to develop and sell to previous ArtCAM customers

2018
upon request to comm. dep.: Autodesk did not continue to develop and supporting the (Footwear) software; beside Powershape

== Products ==
=== Advanced Manufacturing Solutions ===
==== PowerSHAPE ====
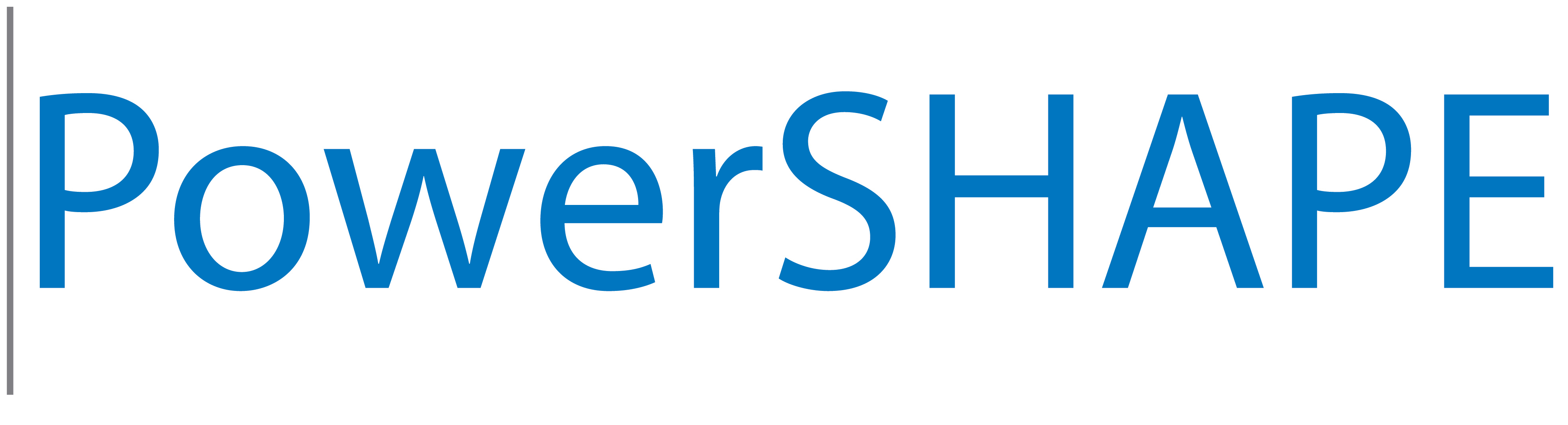

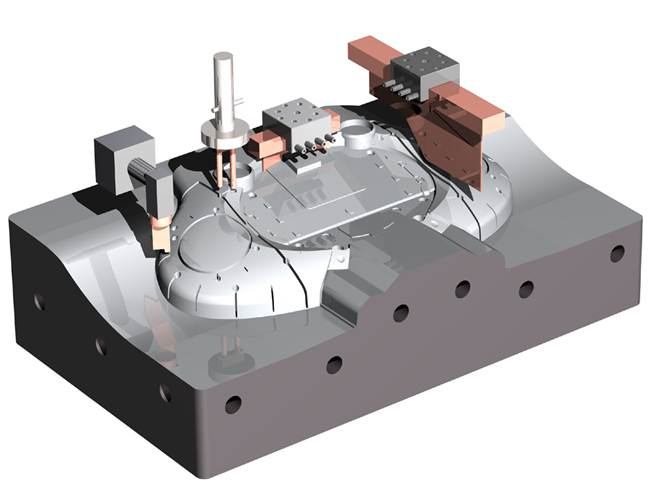
Render of 3D model assembly on PowerSHAPE.

Is a 3D CAD (Computer-aided Design) solution that runs on Microsoft Windows which allows for the design of 3D complex models using surfaces, solids and triangles. The software allows for the import of 3D point cloud data to reverse engineer 3D models. PowerSHAPE is used for a variety of applications including Modelling for manufacture, electrode design, mould and toolmaking. The code of PowerSHAPE originates from the DUCT software.

==== PowerMILL ====
PowerMILL (Software)
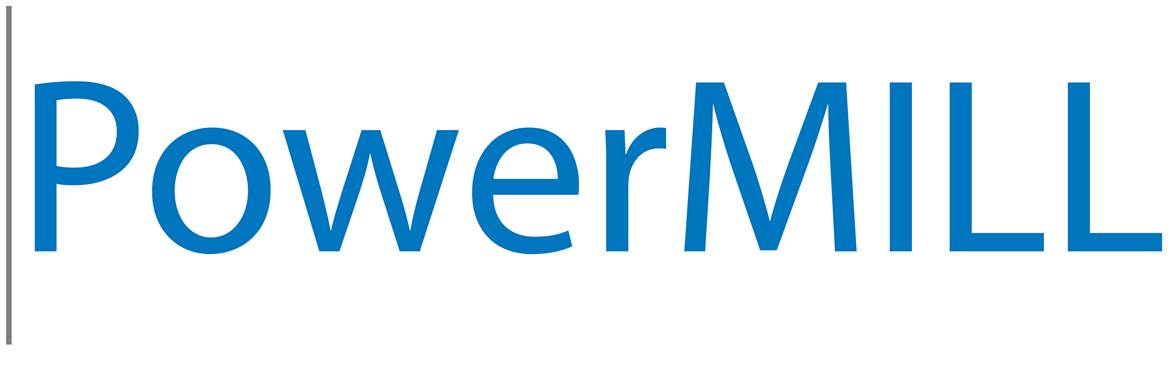
- Developer: Autodesk Inc.
- Release: 1995
- Stable release: 2021.1.1 / April 15, 2021; 5 years ago
- Operating system: Microsoft Windows 10
- Platform: x64
- Type: CAM
- Website: www.autodesk.com/products/powermill/overview

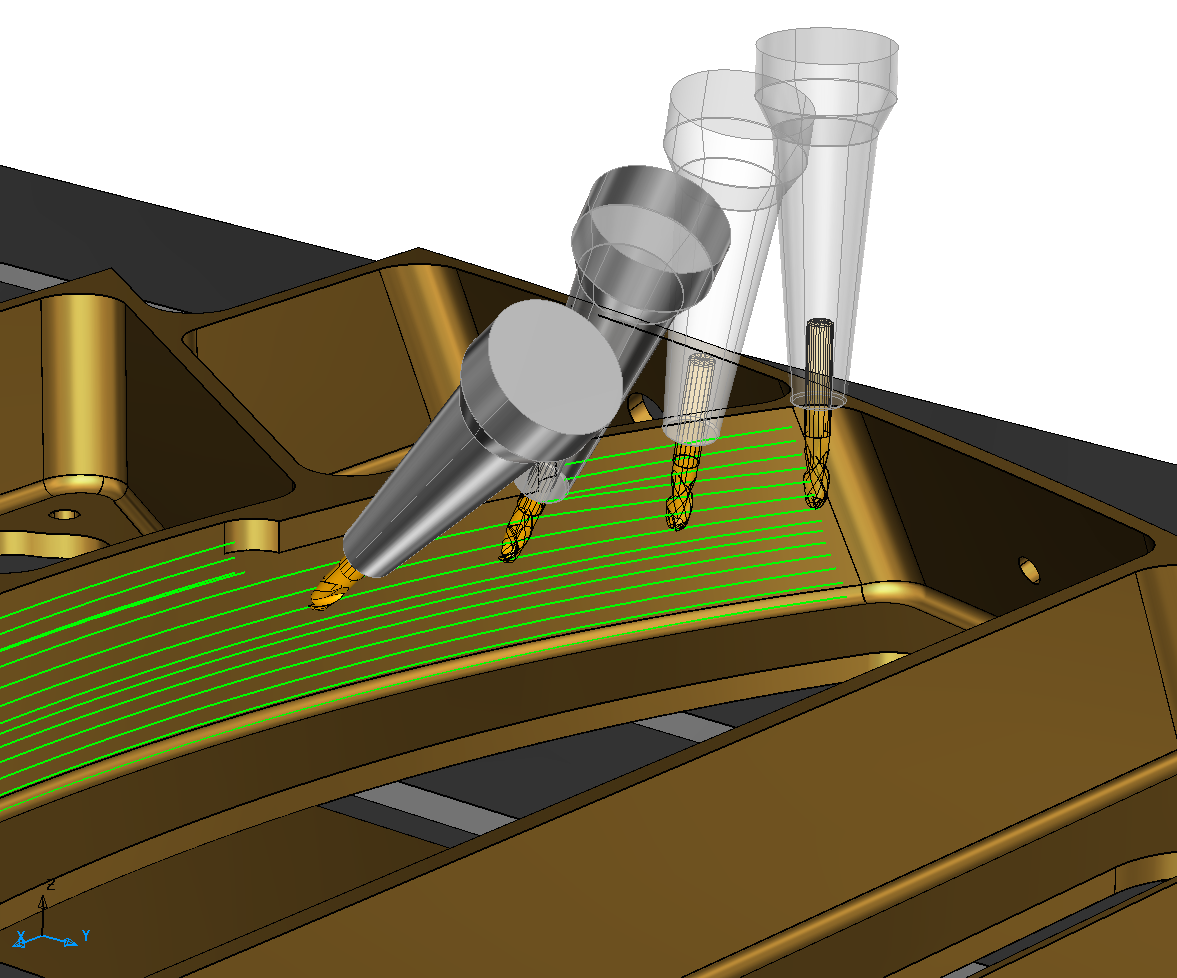
Toolpath strategies using PowerMILL

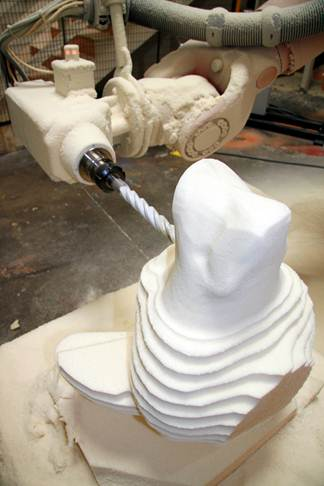
Robot machining part programmed using PowerMILL Robot Interface

PowerMILL is a 3D CAM solution that runs on Microsoft Windows for the programming of tool paths for 2 to 5 axis CNC (Computer Numerical Control) Milling machines developed by Autodesk Inc. The software is used in a range of different engineering industries to determine optimal tool paths to reduce time and manufacturing costs as well as reduce tool loads and produce smooth surface finishes. More than 15,000 organisations use PowerMILL worldwide.

The code of PowerMILL originates from the software DUCT which was developed in 1973 by Donald Welbourn and Ed Lambourne along with the help of Delta Metal Group, whose funding aided the transfer of the system into industry. DUCT was initially developed with the sponsorship of Control Data in Germany in the form of access to their time-sharing computing resources. The advancement of mini computers from 1982 meant that it became economically viable to design complex 3D shapes using a computer.

From 1995 to 1998 DUCT was gradually replaced with a new range of products, which covered the full manufacturing cycle from conceptual design through to manufacture. Delcam's Power Solution range of products that built upon the functionality of the DUCT suite, incorporated the latest user interface technology and offered users many new benefits.

Release history:

Release Version	Date
PowerMILL 1.0	1992
PowerMILL 2.0	1995
PowerMILL 3.0	2000
PowerMILL 4.0	2002
PowerMILL 5.0	2003
PowerMILL 6.0	2005
PowerMILL 7.0	2006
PowerMILL 8.0	2007
PowerMILL 9.0	2008
PowerMILL 10.0	2009
PowerMILL 2010	2010-03-15
PowerMILL 2011	2010-11-22
PowerMILL 2012 (R1)	2011-09-01
PowerMILL 2012 (R2)	2012-03-19
PowerMILL 2013	2013-01-02
PowerMILL 2014 (R1)	2013-09-06
PowerMILL 2014 (R2)	2014-02-20
PowerMILL 2015 (R1)	2014-06-25
PowerMILL 2015 (R2)	2015-01-02
PowerMILL 2016 (R1)	2015-07-16
Autodesk PowerMill 2017	2016-08-01
Autodesk PowerMill 2018	2017-04-21
Autodesk PowerMill 2019	2018-03-29
Autodesk PowerMill Ultimate 2020	2019-05-15
Autodesk PowerMill Ultimate 2021	2020-05-13
Autodesk PowerMill Ultimate 2022	2021-05-12
Autodesk PowerMill Ultimate 2023	2022-05-11
Autodesk PowerMill Ultimate 2024	2023-05-10
Autodesk PowerMill Ultimate 2025	2024-09-10
Autodesk PowerMill Ultimate 2026	2025-05-14

==== PowerINSPECT ====
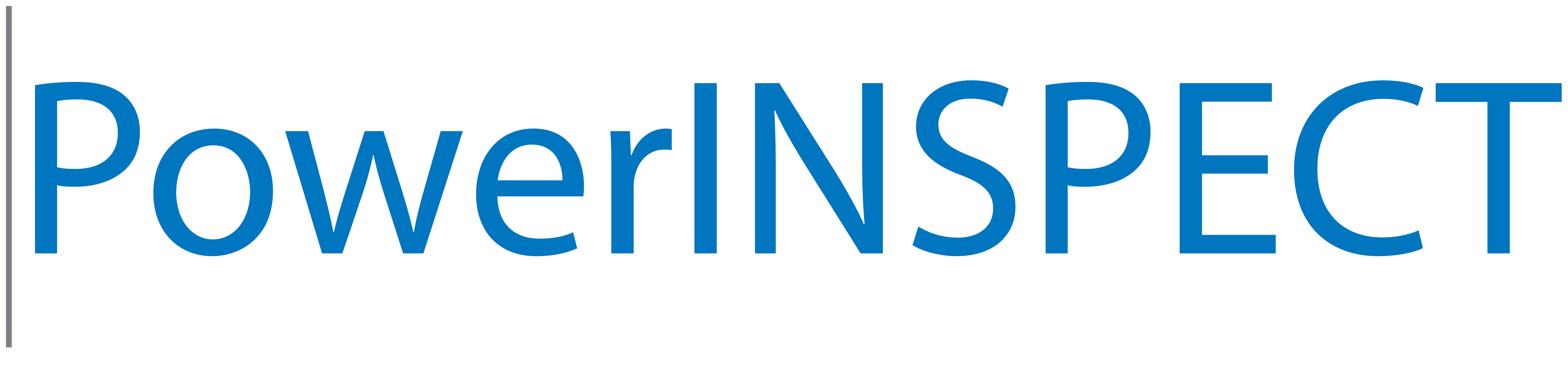

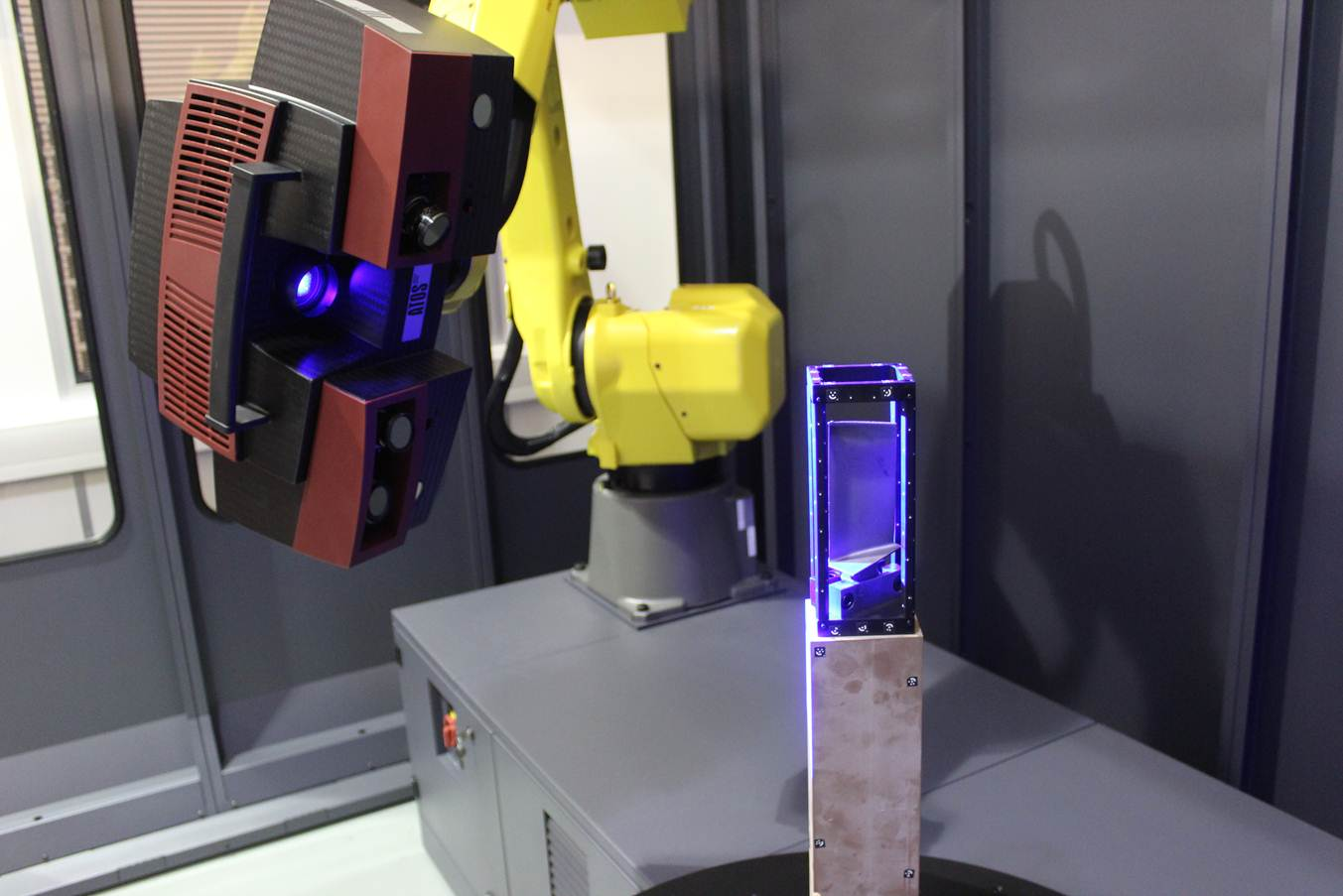
Robot scan using PowerINSPECT.

A CAD based inspection solution package for use with many types of inspection hardware, including manual and CNC CMMs, portable arms, optical measuring devices and CNC machine tools (OMV). Developed for use on Microsoft Windows, the software is sold to a wide range of industries.

In 2004 Delcam won a Queen's award for innovation for PowerINSPECT and by 2008 PowerINSPECT was Delcam's second biggest selling product.

==== PowerMILL Robot Interface ====
A software package for the programming of machining robots with up to 8 axes.

==== FeatureCAM ====
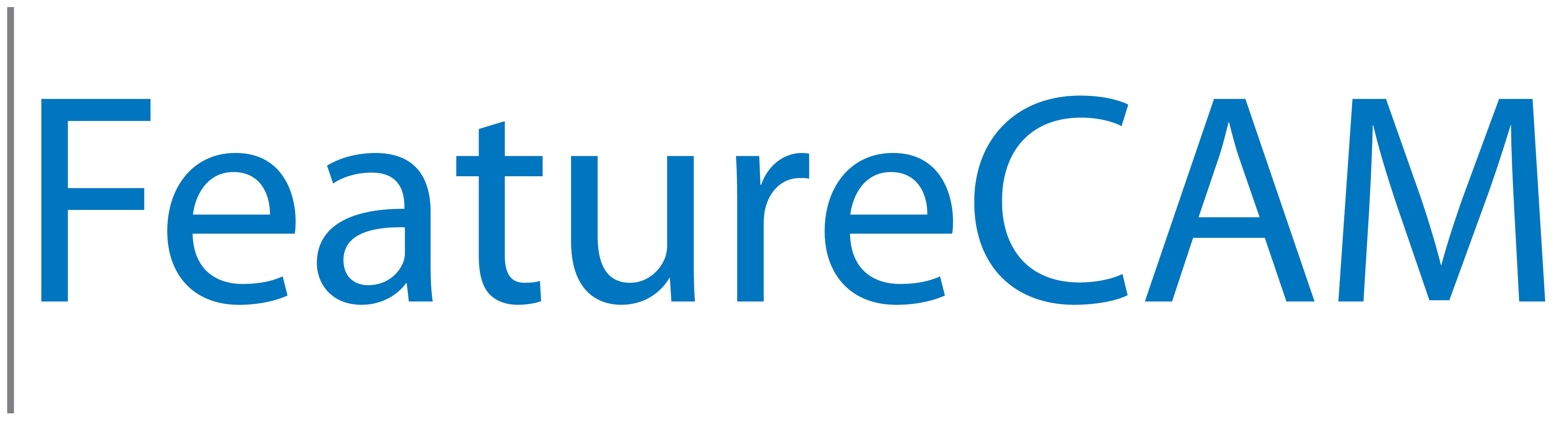

A feature-based CAM solution for milling, turning, and wire EDM.

==== Others ====
PartMaker

A CAM software for programming of turn-mill equipment bar-fed mills and Swiss-type lathes.

Delcam for SolidWorks

A CAM solution based on PowerMILL and FeatureCAM embedded into SolidWorks.

Delcam Exchange

A CAD data translator for reading and writing all commonly used CAD format files.

Delcam Electrode

An integrated software within PowerSHAPE for automatic generation of solid electrode models for EDM with optional tool path generation in PowerMILL.

=== Metrology Solutions ===
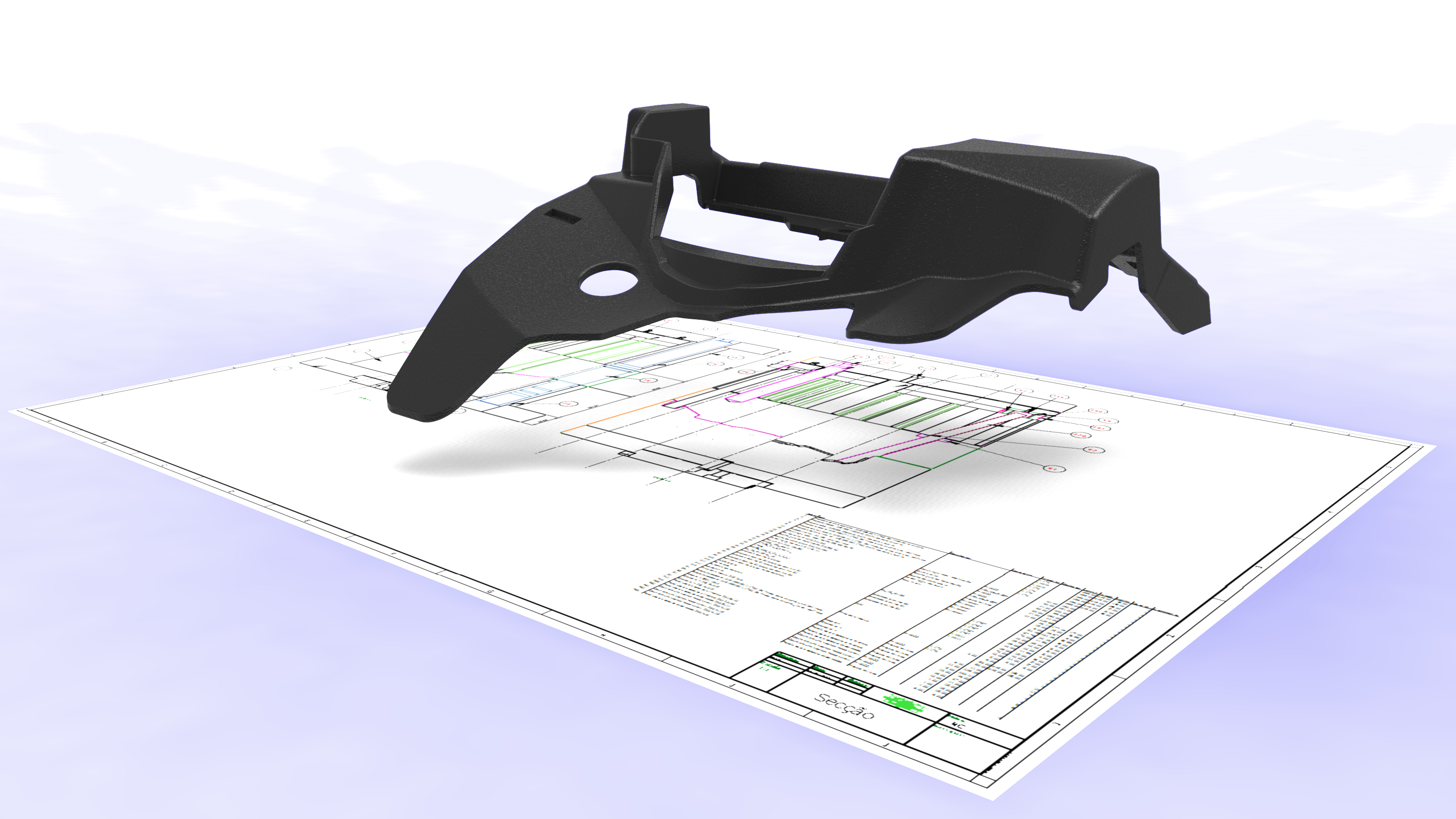
3D Rendered model from PowerSHAPE

On-Machine Verification

A package for measurement of complex parts directly on the machine tools.

=== Artistic CADCAM Solutions ===
ArtCAM JewelSmith

A specialist 3D design and manufacture solution for jewelers.

ArtCAM Pro

A complete solution for the design and manufacture of 2D Artwork & 3D Reliefs.

ArtCAM Insignia

Is for production-level layout and manufacture of 2D Artwork & 3D Reliefs.

ArtCAM Express

Is a low cost introductory design and machining solution.

After acquisition by Autodesk in 2014, Artcam brand was discontinued However the software is still in existence and licensed under another name - 'Carveco'

=== Footwear Solutions ===
OrderManager

Is a web-based workflow management tool for tracking orders remotely.

OrthoMODEL

Is a software package for the design of custom orthotic insoles.

OrthoMILL

Is a software package for the manufacture of custom orthotic insoles.

iQube Scanner

Is a foot, plaster cast and foambox scanner

LastMaker

Is a software package for 3D last modification and 3D last grading.

ShoeMaker

Is a software package for the 3D design of footwear.

SoleEngineer

Is software for 3D sole unit engineering and grading.

Engineer Pro

Is software for 2D pattern engineering and grading.

PatternCut

Is software for 2D pattern part nesting and cutting.

KnifeCut

Is software for 2D pattern part nesting and cutting for projection cutting machines.

ShoeCost

Is software for total footwear costing.

TechPac

Is a technical documentation software package

== Awards ==
1991
Queen's Award for International Trade

2003
Queen's Award for Innovation awarded for ArtCAM

2004
Queen's Award for Innovation awarded for PowerINSPECT

2005
Queen's Award for International Trade

2010
Queen's Award for Innovation awarded for Dental CADCAM Software
2011
Queen's Award for International Trade
2011
Ringier Technology Innovation Award for 'Delcam for SolidWorks' from International Metalworking News
2012
MTA Manufacturing Industry Award for Best Supplier Partnership for its relationship with Coventry Engineering Group
2014
MWP Awards 2014 – Best CADCAM or Control System
2014
Asian Manufacturing Awards 2014 - Best CAM Systems Provider

== Graduate Programme ==
Delcam operates a development scheme for engineering and software graduates. The graduate programme consists of five 10-week rotations across different functions of the company. Functions include Professional Services, international support, marketing, ArtCAM, PowerINSPECT, and training. Graduates also have the opportunity to work at Delcam USA in Philadelphia or Salt Lake City.

== Boris ==
Delcam's logo incorporates a computer-modelled spider named Boris. This was produced as an experiment to render hairs in Delcam's CAD software in 1984. Upon seeing a machined version at a show, the Managing Director Hugh Humphreys decided to take it home and use it within the company's logo.

== See also ==
- List of computer-aided manufacturing software
