= Jackson Kelly (law firm) =

Jackson Kelly PLLC
- No. of offices: 12
- No. of attorneys: Over 160
- Major practice areas: General Practice
- Key people: Bob Tweel, Managing Member; James A. Lowen, Executive Director
- Date founded: 1822 (Benjamin H. Smith); 1865 (Smith & Knight); 1892 (Brown, Jackson & Knight); 1955 (Jackson, Kelly, Holt & O'Farrell); 2002 (Jackson Kelly)
- Company type: Professional limited liability company
- Website: JacksonKelly.com

Jackson Kelly PLLC, known as Jackson Kelly, is a full service law firm and one of the 250 largest law firms headquartered in the United States. The firm, which has a strong presence in Appalachia and the Midwestern United States, was formed in 1822 when Benjamin H. Smith began practicing law in what was then Charleston, Virginia. U.S. News & World Report ranks the firm as the nation's best in mining and mineral law, but as a full-service law firm, Jackson Kelly provides legal counseling and litigation to a wide range of clients across many practice areas. The firm employs more than 160 lawyers in offices throughout West Virginia, Kentucky, Indiana, Pennsylvania, Ohio, Washington, D.C., and Colorado.

== History ==
Benjamin H. Smith began practicing law in 1822 in what was then Charleston, Virginia. When West Virginia was created out of the Civil War, Smith participated in its Constitutional Convention and was appointed United States District Attorney for West Virginia by President Abraham Lincoln. Smith practiced with two other lawyers, James H. Brown and Edward B. Knight, and in 1892 they formed Brown, Jackson & Knight. It went through a number of name changes until adopting Jackson Kelly in 2002. From its earliest days the firm devoted much of its service to the coal industry, although it has since diversified into a full-service law firm. In 1985, the firm opened its first office beyond West Virginia, in Lexington, Kentucky. It continued to expand throughout the Midwest and as far west as Colorado.

Jackson Kelly was the subject of controversy due to its representation of coal companies in black lung cases. The investigative journalist Chris Hamby alleges that Jackson Kelly has a decades-long history of "orchestrating sophisticated legal strategies to defeat claims [...] locking sick miners out of the benefits system." Some judges interviewed by Hamby condemned the firm for its tactics to win such cases at all costs. The firm's conduct was defended by West Virginia Senator Joe Manchin to journalists.

== Practice areas ==
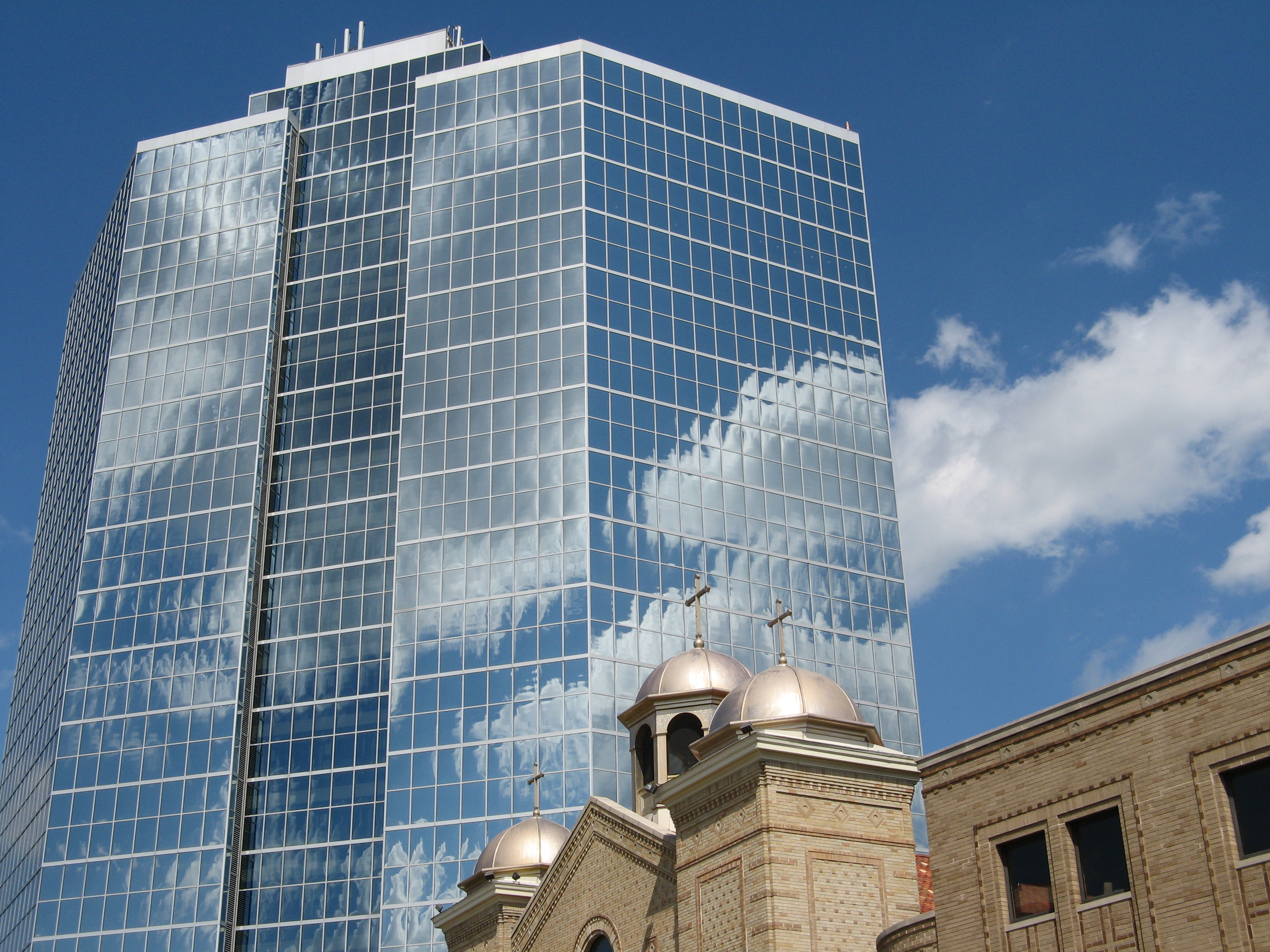
Laidley Tower, headquarters of the firm's Charleston office

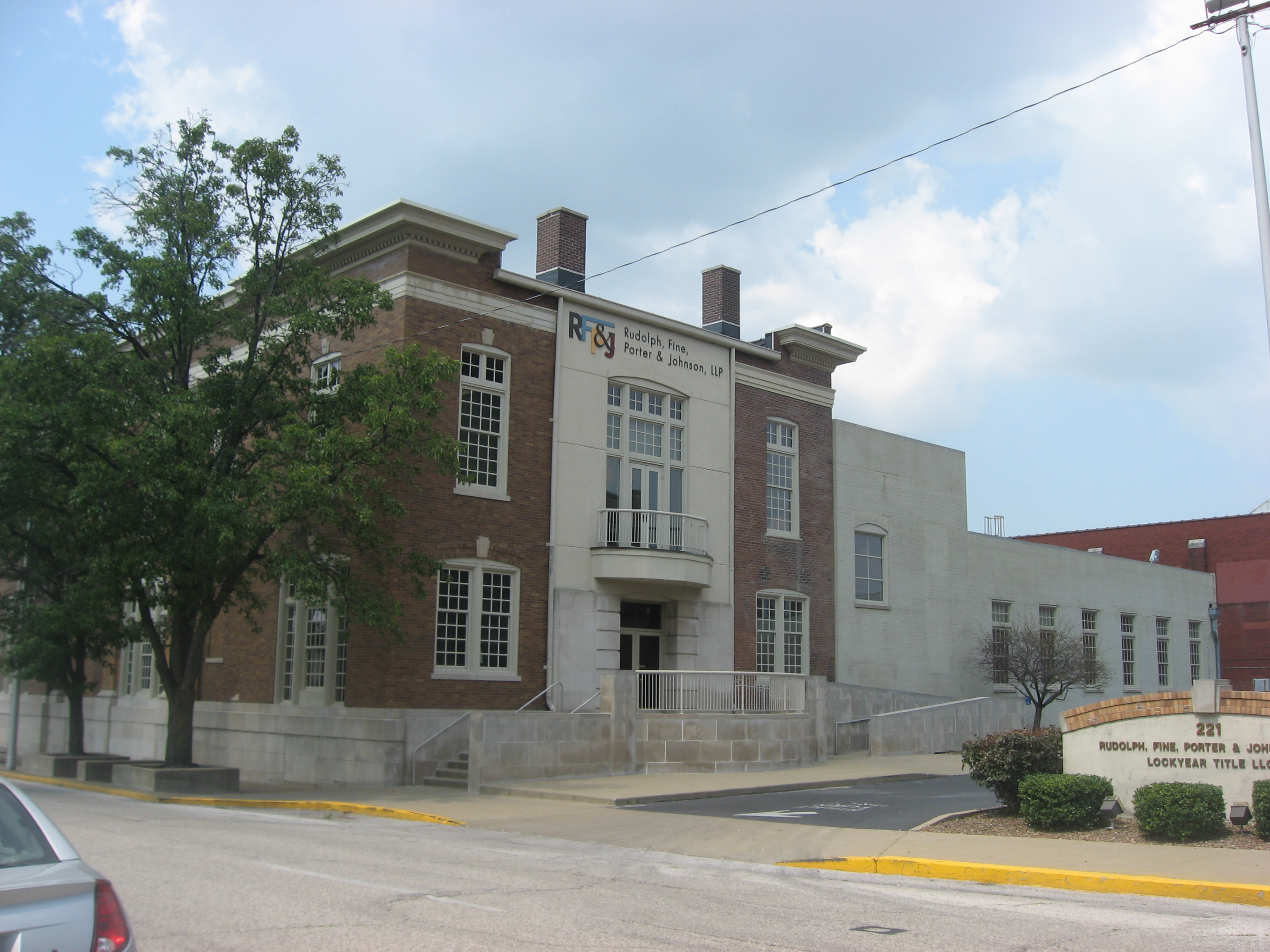
Eagles Home, headquarters of the firm's Evansville office

Jackson Kelly serves a wide variety of corporate and public clients in the following areas:

- Corporate
- Employee Benefits
- Environmental
- Finance & Restructuring
- Government
- Health Care
- Intellectual Property
- Labor & Employment
- Litigation & Advocacy
- Mining law
- Natural resource law
- Real Estate & Construction
- Regulatory
- Tax
- Wealth Management

The firm is considered "the go-to place" for legal representation in the mining and coal industry.

== Notable awards and rankings ==
U.S. News & World Report named Jackson Kelly the nation’s top firm in mining law in 2019, 2017, 2015, 2012, and 2011; it was the first law firm to receive the national recognition. The firm was also ranked the number one workers' compensation practice in the nation in Woodward and White's "The Best Lawyers in America" with more lawyers listed in "Best Lawyers" than any other firm in the country. Jackson Kelly is one of just five of the 250 largest firms in the United States where women make up more than 25 percent of equity partners.

== Notable attorneys and alumni ==
- William Miller Drennen (1914-2000), former Chief Judge of the United States Tax Court
- Betty Ireland, 28th Secretary of State of West Virginia and first woman elected to the executive branch of West Virginia state government
- M. Blane Michael, former Judge of the United States Court of Appeals for the Fourth Circuit
- John S. Palmore, former Chief Justice of the Kentucky Supreme Court
- William Powell, U.S. Attorney for the Northern District of West Virginia
