= Welbourne =

Welbourne is a surname. Notable people with the surname include:

- Don Welbourne (born 1949), English footballer
- Duncan Welbourne (1940–2019), English footballer and manager
- Edward Welbourne (1894–1966), Master of Emmanuel College, Cambridge
- Thomas Welbourne (died 1605), English martyr

== See also ==
- Welborn (disambiguation)
- Welbourn (disambiguation)
- Welburn (disambiguation)
- Wellborn (disambiguation)
