= Alexandrian Public Library =

Public library in Mount Vernon, Indiana

Coordinates: 37.933367°N 87.896660°W

The Alexandrian Public Library serves the residents of Mount Vernon, Indiana as well as Black, Lynn, Marrs, Point and Robinson townships (approximately 21,000 residents). Founded by Matilda Greathouse Alexander, the library has been in existence since 1895.

The Main Library, built in 1986, is located at 115 West Fifth Street, and boasts over 100,000 items, a dozen public computers, as well as free Wi-Fi. In addition, a Bookmobile operates to serve the area schools and outlying areas of the county. The building was renovated in 2015 to add a new entryway and three study rooms.

A monthly book discussion group for adults, numerous storytimes, a Summer Reading Program, and targeted programming for youth, young adult, and adults is offered free of charge to the public on a regular basis.

The Alexandrian Public Library also has a varied and popular collection of local history resources and family history files in the "Indiana Room" of the Main Library. Microfilmed newspapers, contributed family documents, resources from the Posey County Historical Society and more are available for genealogists and researchers.

Meeting rooms are also available for use by the public at the library, with charges for for-profit groups.

== Resources ==
- Alexandrian Public Library website
