= Matilda Greathouse Alexander =

Indiana writer (1842–1892)

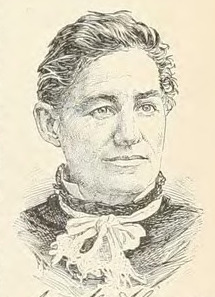
- Born: June 14, 1842; Mount Vernon
- Died: September 28, 1904
- Occupation: Writer

Matilda Greathouse Alexander (June 14, 1842 – September 28, 1904) was an American novelist, poet, and journalist, best known for the novel Going West (1881).

Matilda Greathouse Alexander was born on June 14, 1842 in Mount Vernon, Indiana, the daughter of George Washington Greathouse and Martha Greathouse. She married Andrew Lynne Alexander in 1863 and he died in 1866. Their only child, Rosamonde Alexander Peckinpaugh, committed suicide by drowning in the Hudson River in 1892.

Alexander published poetry and journalism in Indiana newspapers. She wrote for a number of smaller papers, as well as for the Indianapolis Times. She was the Times' correspondent for the 1893 Chicago World's Fair.

Alexander published at least two novels, the melodramatic novel Going West (1881) and Worth Wins (1882). Other novels and a play about Abraham Lincoln are credited to her, but it is unclear if they were never published or are now lost.

Alexander formed Mount Vernon's first public library, The Alexander Literary Society, in 1892. When a Carnegie library opened in Mount Vernon in 1905, it was named the Alexandrian Public Library in her honor.

Matilda Greathouse Alexander died on September 28, 1904.

== Bibliography ==
- Going West: or, Homes for the Homeless. A Novel. Indianapolis, 1881.
- Worth Wins: A Novel. St. Louis, 1882.
