= Francis C. Green =

American soldier in the U.S. Army

- Born: September 4, 1835; Mount Vernon, Indiana, United States
- Died: March 13, 1905 (aged 69); Erin, Tennessee
- Burial place: Nicholas Private Property, Courthouse Square
- Military career
- Allegiance: United States of America
- Branch: United States Army
- Service years: c. 1868–1870
- Rank: Sergeant
- Unit: 8th U.S. Cavalry
- Conflicts: Indian Wars
- Awards: Medal of Honor

Francis C. Green (September 4, 1835 – March 13, 1905) was an American soldier in the U.S. Army who served with the 8th U.S. Cavalry during the Indian Wars. A veteran of the campaign against Vittorio and Nana during the 1860s, he was one of eight cavalrymen to receive the Medal of Honor for "bravery in scouts and actions" during several engagements against the Apache Indians in the Arizona Territory in 1868 and 1869.

== Biography ==
Francis C. Green was born in Mount Vernon, Indiana on December 2, 1846. While living in San Francisco, California, he joined the U.S. Army and was assigned to frontier duty with the 8th U.S. Cavalry in the Arizona Territory. He participated in campaigns against Vittorio and Nana during the 1860s and eventually rose to the rank of sergeant. Green particularly won distinction in several battles against the Apache during 1868 and 1869, and was one of eight members of the 8th Cavalry to receive the Medal of Honor for "bravery in scouts and actions with indians" on September 6, 1869. The other men who were awarded included Sgt. Wilbur N. Taylor, Cpl. Jacob Gunther, Cpl. David A. Matthews, Sgt. James McNally, Sgt. John Moriarity, Pvt. Samuel Richman and Pvt. Otto Smith. Green later settled in Erin, Tennessee where he died March 13, 1905, at age 69. He was later buried in an unmarked grave near Courthouse Square.

== Medal of Honor citation ==
Rank and organization: Sergeant, Company K, 8th U.S. Cavalry. Place and date: Arizona, 1868 and 1869. Entered service at: ------. Birth: Mount Vernon, Ind. Date of issue: 6 September 1869.

Citation:

Bravery in action.

== See also ==
- List of Medal of Honor recipients
