= Mount Vernon Downtown Historic District =

Historic district in Indiana, United States

- U.S. National Register of Historic Places
- U.S. Historic district
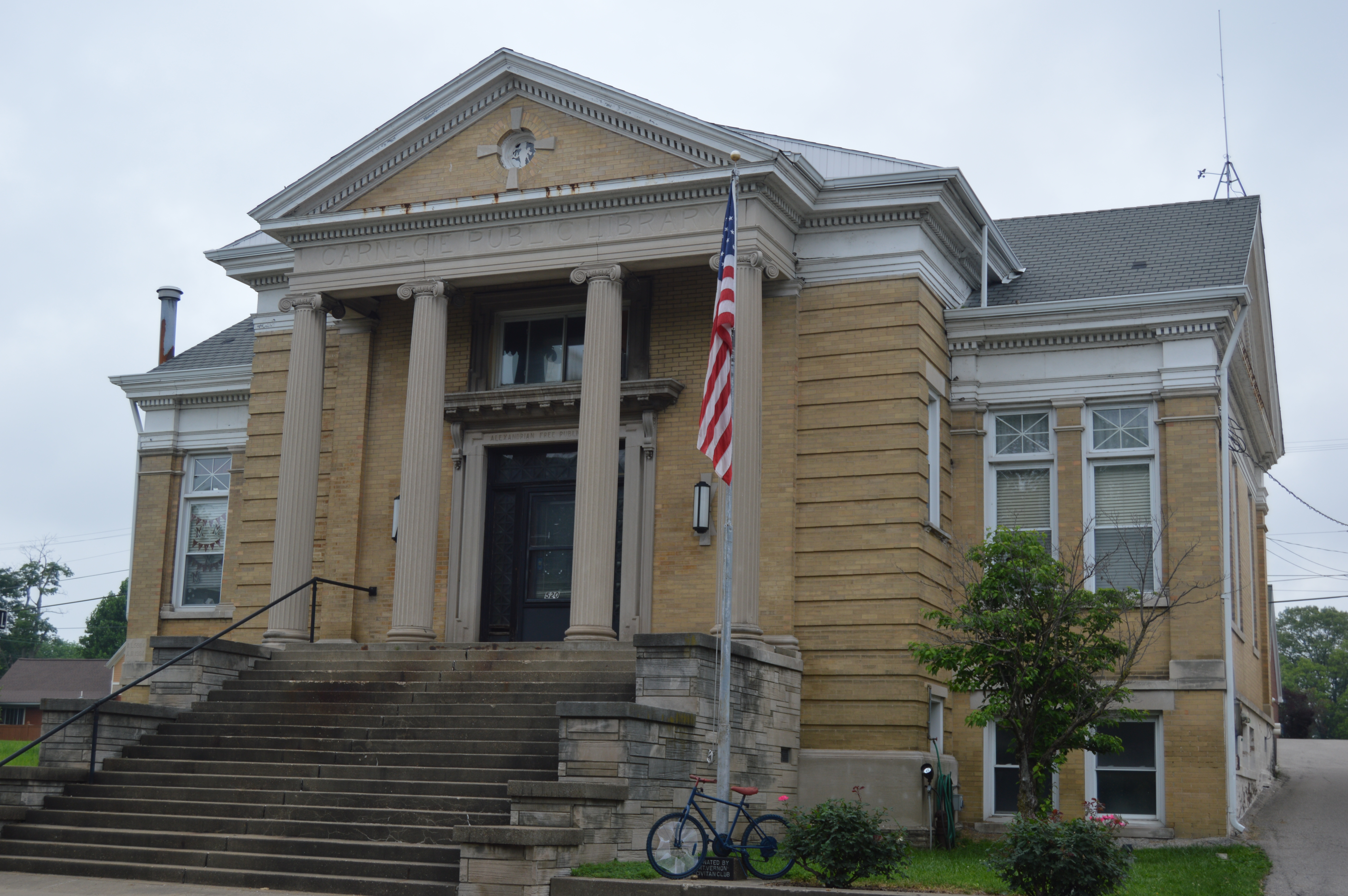
- The original Carnegie Library built 1905

- Location within Indiana Location within the United States
- Location: Roughly bounded by Ohio R., 6th & Walnut Sts. & College Av., Mount Vernon, Indiana
- Coordinates: 37°55′51″N 87°53′46″W
- Area: 21.1 acres (8.5 ha)
- Architect: Behrick, F. & Sons; et.al.
- Architectural style: Late Victorian, Late 19th And 20th Century Revivals
- NRHP reference No.: 03000545
- Added to NRHP: June 22, 2003

Mount Vernon Downtown Historic District is a national historic district located at Mount Vernon, Indiana. The district encompasses 39 contributing buildings, two contributing sites, one contributing structure, and two contributing objects in the central business district of Mount Vernon. It developed between about 1850 and 1953, and includes notable examples of Italianate, Queen Anne, Romanesque Revival, and Classical Revival style architecture. Located in the district is the separately listed Posey County Courthouse Square. Other notable contributing resources include the McFadin Cemetery, Sherburne Park, the Armory (1922), the Alexandrian (Carnegie) Library (1905), City Hall (1893), Fogas Building (1880), Eagles Home (1917), Palace Soda Shop, Memorial Coliseum (1925), and the Opera House (1879).

It was listed on the National Register of Historic Places in 2003.

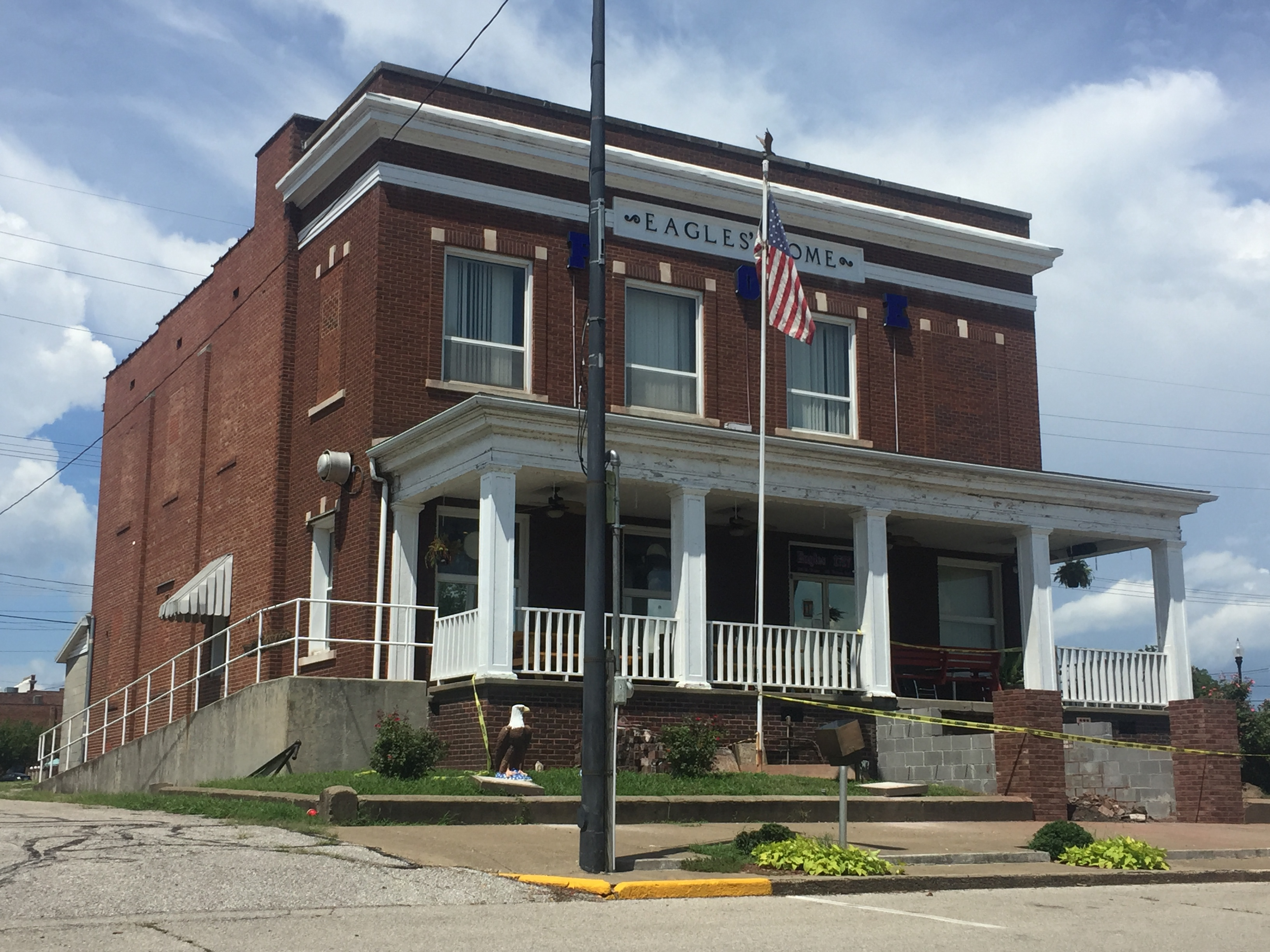
Eagles Home
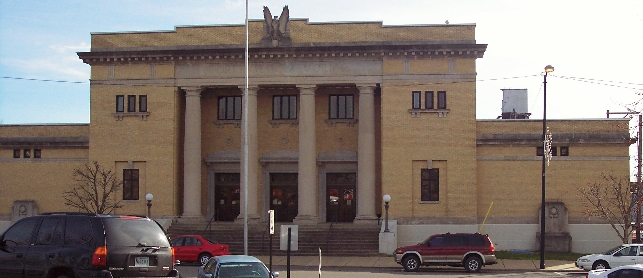
Memorial Coliseum
