= William Gonnerman House =

Historic house in Indiana, United States

- U.S. National Register of Historic Places
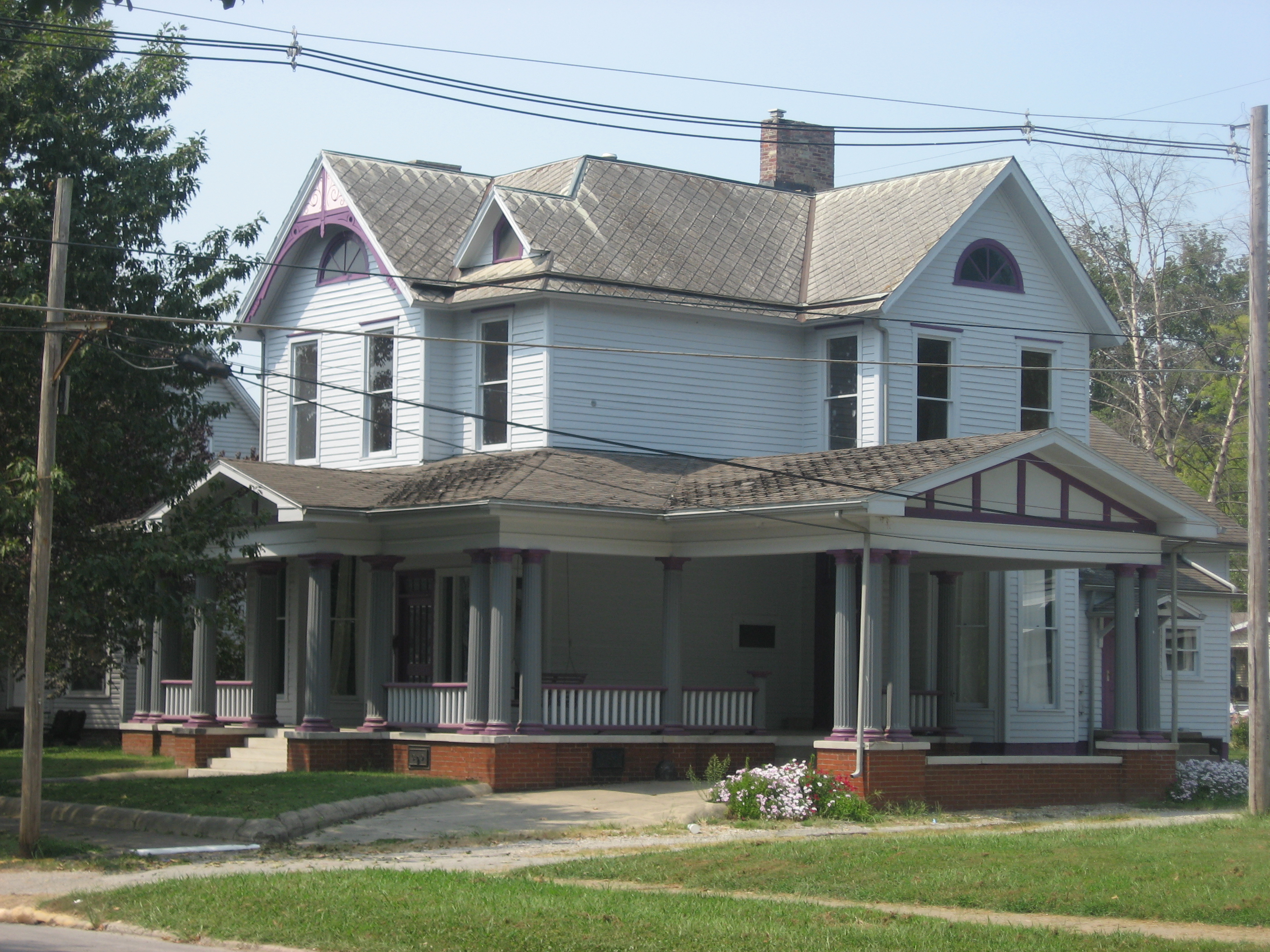
- William Gonnerman House, September 2011

- Location within Indiana Location within the United States
- Location: 521 W. Second St., Mount Vernon, Indiana
- Coordinates: 37°55′44″N 87°54′2″W
- Area: less than one acre
- Built: c. 1887-1895
- Architectural style: Free Classic Style
- NRHP reference No.: 85003192
- Added to NRHP: December 19, 1985

William Gonnerman House is a historic home located at Mount Vernon, Indiana. It was built between about 1887 and 1895, and is a massive two-story, irregular plan, Free Classic style frame dwelling. It sits on a brick and concrete block foundation and has a hipped and gable roof. It features a wraparound porch with 18 fluted columns and a porte cochere. A sun porch wing was added in the 1930s. Also on the property are the contributing carriage house and smokehouse.

It was listed on the National Register of Historic Places in 1985.
