= Wellborn =

Wellborn may refer to:

== Places ==
- Wellborn, Coffee County, Alabama, United States
- Wellborn, Florida, an unincorporated community in Florida, United States
- Wellborn, Texas, an unincorporated community in Texas, United States
- Wellborn District, College Station, Texas, United States
- Wellborn Formation, a geologic formation in Texas, United States

=== Facilities and structures ===
- Farm to Market Road 2154, Texas, United States; a portion of which is also called "Wellborn Road"
- Wellborn (Eufaula, Alabama), a historic house in Eufaula, Alabama, United States

== People ==
- Charles Wellborn Jr., a U.S. Navy admiral; see List of United States Navy vice admirals on active duty before 1960
- James Wellborn (1767–1854), U.S. politician; see List of United States political families (S)
- Joe Wellborn, player of American football for the New York Giants; see List of New York Giants players
- Julia W. Wellborn, U.S. civil servant; see List of executive actions by Theodore Roosevelt
- Marshall Johnson Wellborn (1808–1874), American politician
- Max Wellborn (1862–1957), American banker
- Olin Wellborn (1843–1921), American politician
- Wellborn Jack (1907–1991), U.S. politician and lawyer

== Other uses ==
- Martin Wellborn, a fictional character from The Fall and Rise of Reginald Perrin; see List of The Fall and Rise of Reginald Perrin episodes

== See also ==
- John Wellborn Martin (1884–1958), U.S. politician
- John Wellborn Root (1850–1891), U.S. architect
- John Wellborn Root Jr. (1887–1963), U.S. architect
- Welborn (disambiguation)
- Welbourne (surname)
- Welbourn (disambiguation)
- Welburn (disambiguation)
- Hochwohlgeboren (German: high well born), a German honorific for nobility
- Born (disambiguation)
- Well (disambiguation)
