= Welburn =

Welburn may refer to:

== Places ==
- Welburn, Derwent, near Malton, North Yorkshire, England
- Welburn, Kirkbymoorside, near Kirkbymoorside, North Yorkshire, England

== People with the surname ==
- Ed Welburn (born 1950), American automobile designer
- Ken Welburn (born 1929), English rugby league player

== See also ==
- Welborn (disambiguation)
- Welbourne (surname)
- Welbourn (disambiguation)
- Wellborn (disambiguation)
- Burn (disambiguation)
- Well (disambiguation)
