= Eagles Hall (San Diego) =

- U.S. National Register of Historic Places
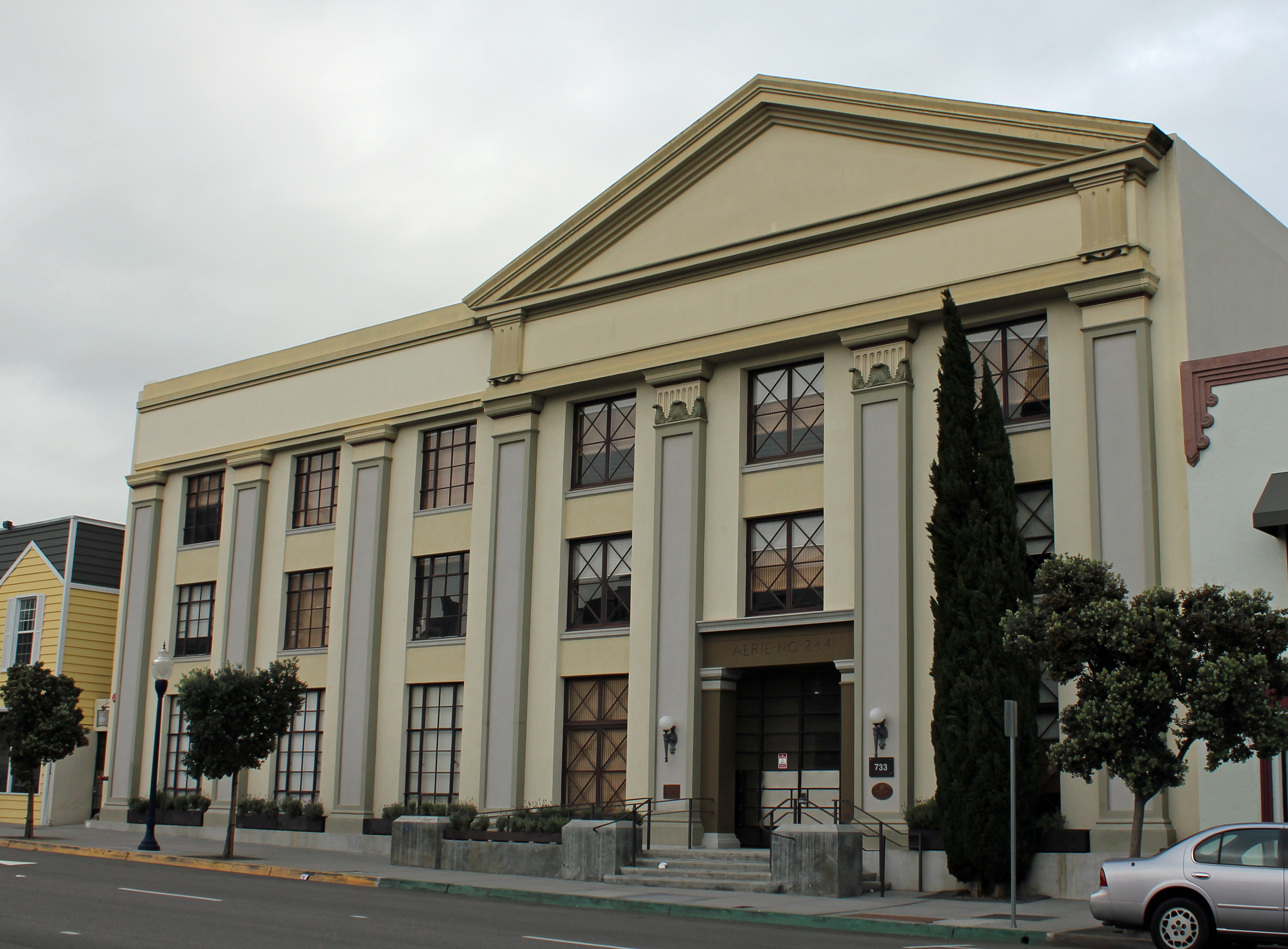

- Location within San Diego Location within San Diego County, California Location within California Location within the United States
- Location: 733 Eighth Ave., San Diego, California
- Coordinates: 32°42′47″N 117°9′21″W
- Area: less than one acre
- Built: 1917, 1934
- Architect: Wheeler, William H.; Siebert, Selmar
- Architectural style: Classical Revival
- NRHP reference No.: 85002723
- Added to NRHP: October 4, 1985

The Eagles Hall is a Classical Revival–style building in San Diego, California. Designed and built in 1917, it was significantly modified in 1934 according to designs by the same architects. It was listed on the National Register of Historic Places in 1985.

Standing three stories tall, the modified building has 18,000 square feet (1,700 m^{2}) on a 100 by 96 feet (30 m × 29 m) plan.

== See also ==
- List of Fraternal Order of Eagles buildings
