= Independent Order of Odd Fellows Hall No. 148 =

- Independent Order of Odd Fellows (IOOF) Hall No. 148
- U.S. National Register of Historic Places
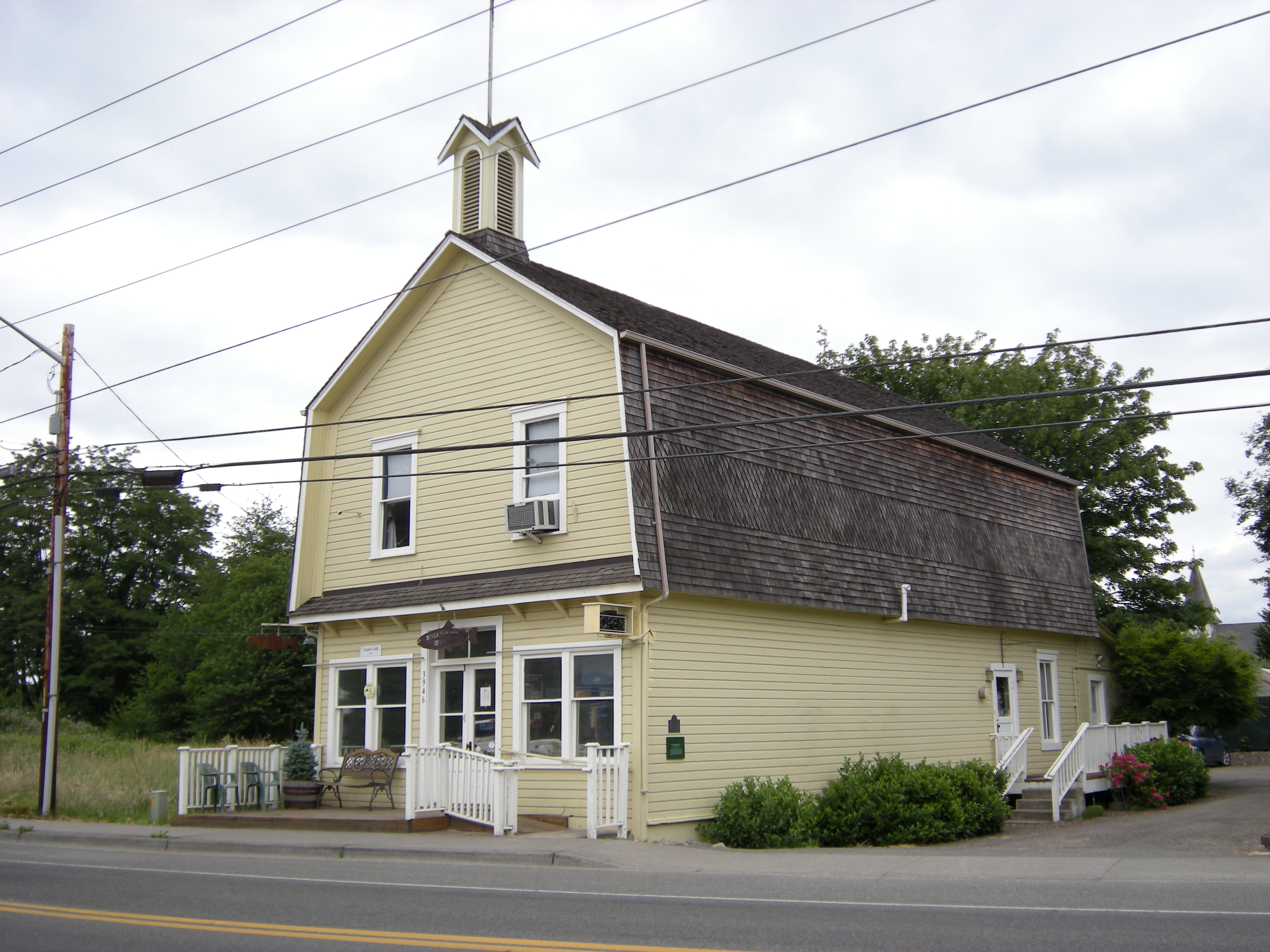
- Building in 2009

- Location within Washington (state)
- Location: 3940 Tolt Ave., Carnation, Washington
- Coordinates: 47°38′39″N 121°54′51″W
- Area: less than one acre
- Built: 1895
- NRHP reference No.: 99000917
- Added to NRHP: July 28, 1999

The Independent Order of Odd Fellows (IOOF) Hall No. 148, also known as Fraternal Order of Eagles (FOE) Aerie No. 2059, is a meeting hall building in Carnation, Washington. It was built in 1895. listed on the National Register of Historic Places in 1999.

In 1985 the building was listed as a King County, Washington historic site.

The building has a prominent gambrel roof which gives it a barn-like appearance.

The building is currently occupied by a business named "River Run Anglers" The east bank of the Snoqualmie River is a few hundred yards away.

== Gallery ==
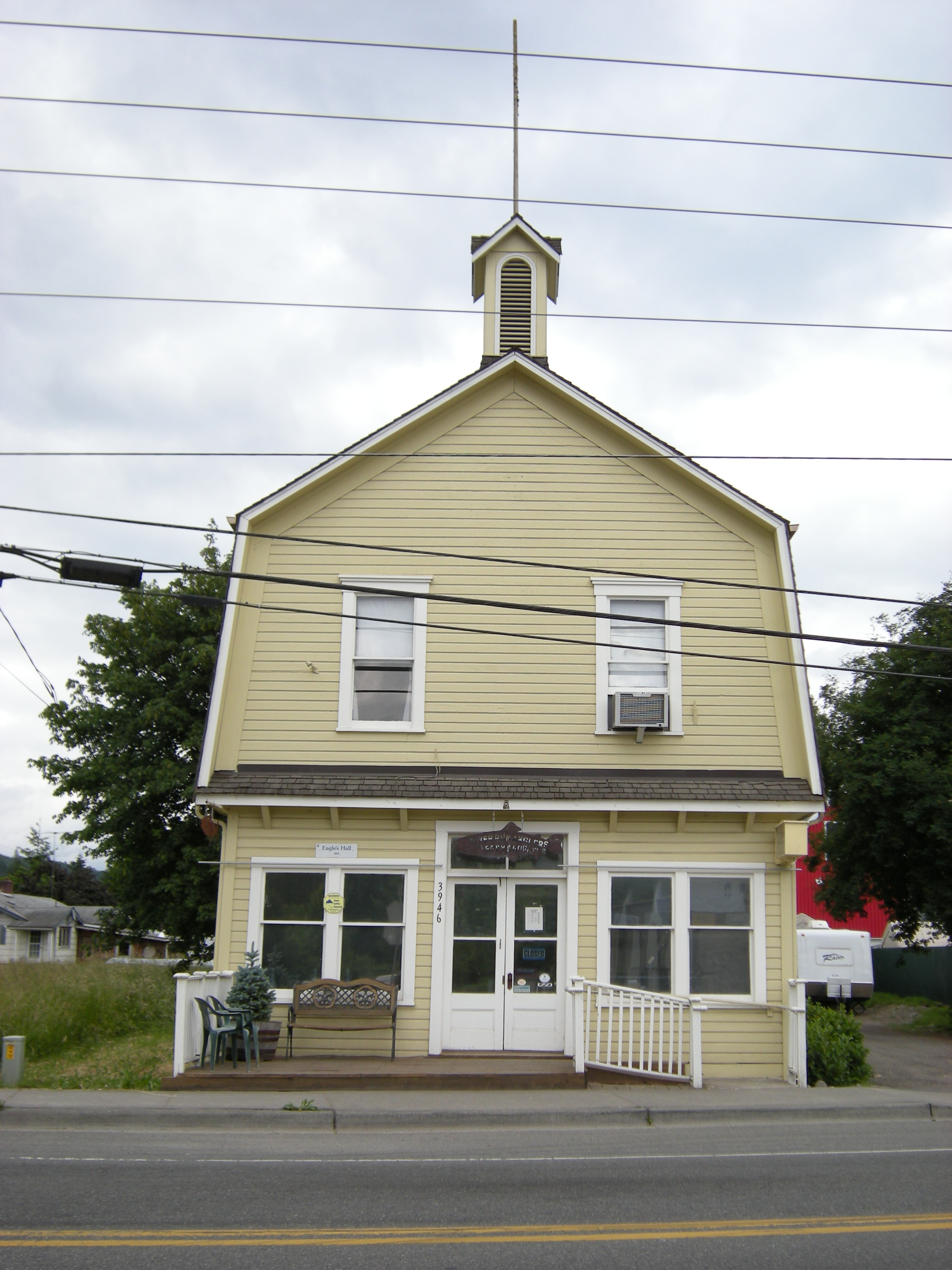

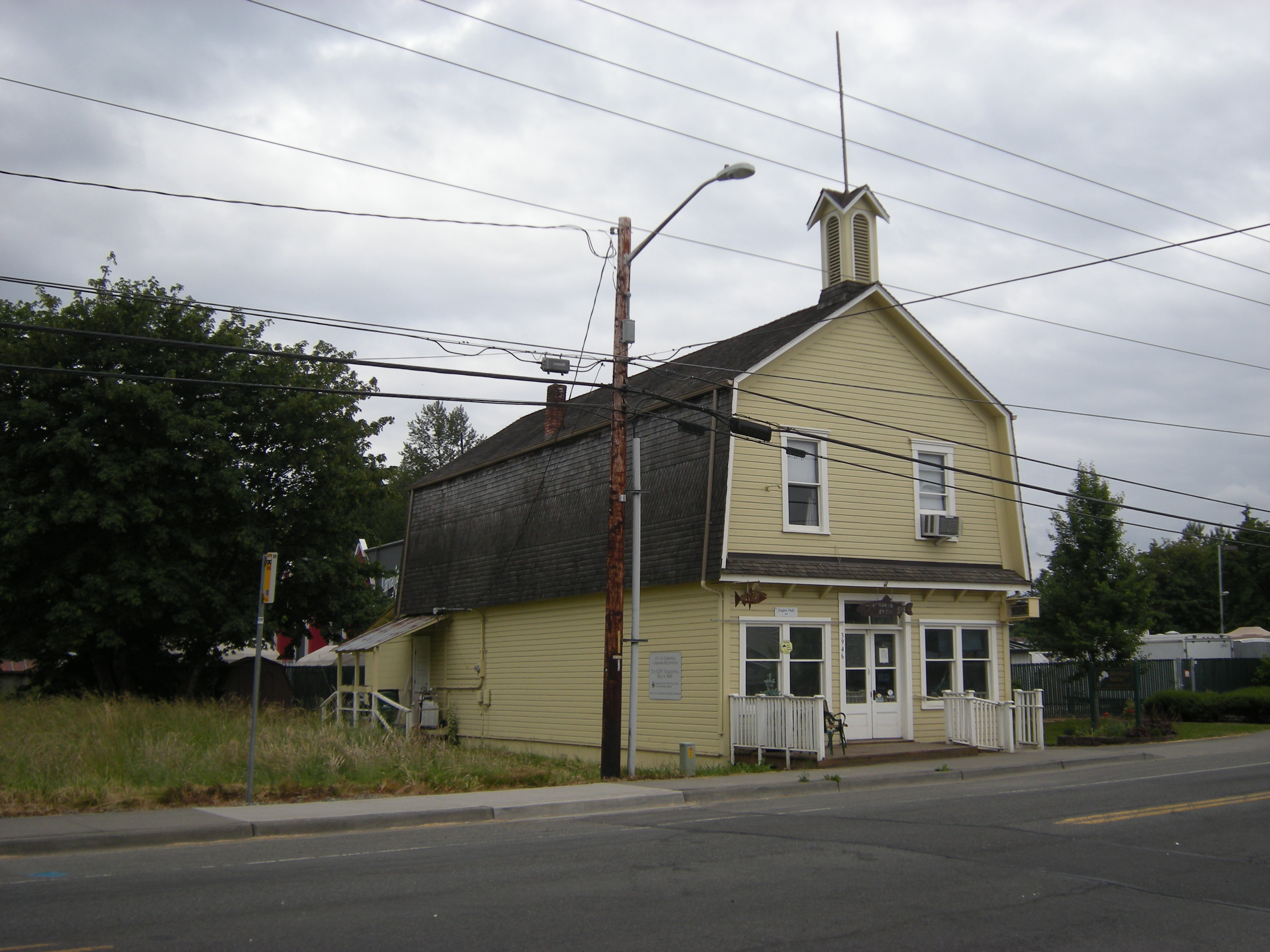
