= Don Welbourne =

English footballer

Personal information
- Full name: Donald Welbourne
- Date of birth: 12 March 1949 (age 77)
- Place of birth: Scunthorpe, England
- Position: Defender

Youth career
- Scunthorpe United

Senior career*
Years	Team	Apps	(Gls)
1966–1976	Scunthorpe United	254	(5)
1975	Boston Minutemen	17	(0)
- * Club domestic league appearances and goals

Donald Welbourne (born 12 March 1949) is an English former professional footballer who made more than 250 appearances in the Football League playing as a central defender for Scunthorpe United. He also played in the North American Soccer League (NASL) for the Boston Minutemen.

== Career ==
Welbourne was born in Scunthorpe, Lincolnshire. He began his football career as an apprentice with Scunthorpe United, and made his debut as a 17-year-old in September 1966. After establishing himself in the first team a couple of years later, he spent seven seasons as a regular, and was part of the Fourth Division team that knocked First Division Sheffield Wednesday out of the 1969–70 FA Cup on Wednesday's own ground, before injury ended his professional career in November 1975. In 1969, he and Grimsby Town player Graham Rathbone were sent off for fighting, and each received an eight-week ban, "suspensions of unprecedented severity", according to The Times. Welbourne played for the Boston Minutemen, alongside Eusébio, as they won the Northern Division of the North American Soccer League in 1975. He later became a window-cleaner. He also played for Appleby Frodingham.

Welbourne's older brother Duncan was also a professional footballer who played more than 450 games for Watford.
