= Welborn Historic District =

Historic district in Indiana, United States

- U.S. National Register of Historic Places
- U.S. Historic district
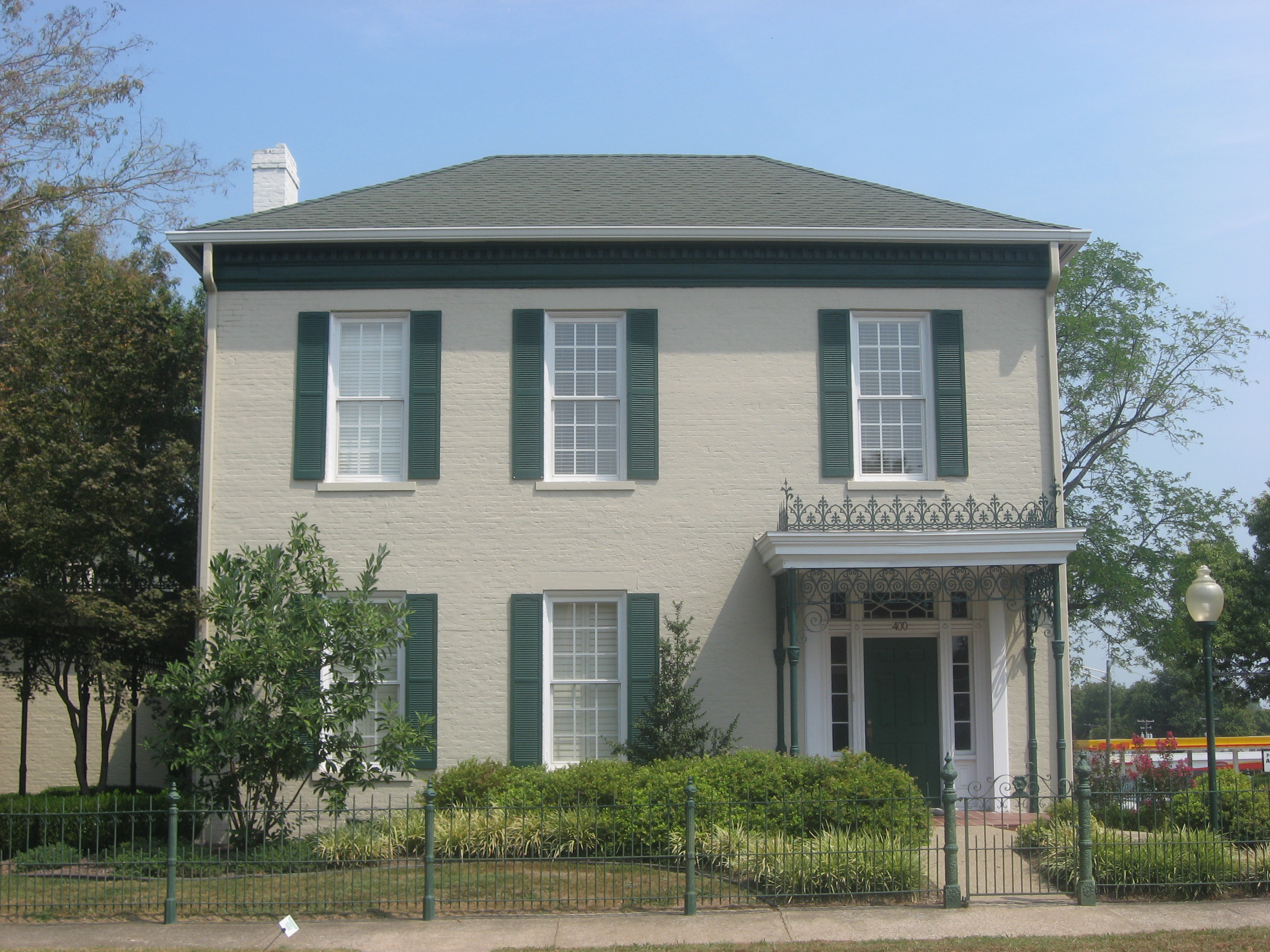
- 1850 Sullivan House, September 2011

- Location within Indiana Location within the United States
- Location: Roughly bounded by Ninth, Locust and 2nd Sts. and the alley between Walnut and Main Sts., Mount Vernon, Indiana
- Coordinates: 37°56′03″N 87°53′38″W
- Area: 51.3 acres (20.8 ha)
- Architectural style: Late 19th And 20th Century Revivals, Mid 19th Century Revival, Late Victorian
- NRHP reference No.: 92000188
- Added to NRHP: March 25, 1992

Welborn Historic District is a national historic district located at Mount Vernon, Indiana. The district encompasses 154 contributing buildings and five contributing structures in a predominantly residential section of Mount Vernon laid out by Jesse Welborn between 1822 and 1826. It developed between about 1840 and 1942, and includes notable examples of Greek Revival, Gothic Revival, Italianate, Romanesque Revival, and Colonial Revival style architecture. Notable contributing buildings include the Gov. Alvin P. Hovey House (c. 1847, 1871), Edward Sullivan House (1860), C.P. Klein House Johnson-Rosenbaum House (1905), St. Matthew's Catholic Church (1880), First Presbyterian Church (1872), Trinity Evangelical Church (1883), St. John's Episcopal Church (1892), Mount Vernon Post Office (1931).

It was listed on the National Register of Historic Places in 1992.
