= Richard Burkewood Welbourn =

British scientist and educator

Richard Burkewood Welbourn, FRCS (1 May 1919 in Rainhill, Lancashire – 3 August 2005 in Reading, Berkshire) was a British scientist and educator, specializing in surgical endocrinology. He was professor and chairman of the Department of Surgery at the Royal Postgraduate Medical School, Hammersmith Hospital.

== Career ==
Welbourn attended Rugby School, Emmanuel College, Cambridge and Liverpool University, graduating in 1942. After graduating he worked as a Casualty Officer at the Royal Southern Hospital. In January 1943 he joined the Royal Army Medical Corps Field Dressing Station, which followed the D-day landings in the Low Countries and France.

In 1951, he earned a Fulbright scholarship to the Mayo Clinic. He joined the staff of Queen's University, Belfast (QUB) in 1952. In 1958 he was named as Professor of Surgical Science. In 1962 he was invited to the Royal Postgraduate Medical School, Hammersmith Hospital and garnered attention for his work on phaeochromocytoma.

== Publications ==
- Clinical Endocrinology for Surgeons (1963)
- Medical and Surgical Endocrinology (1975; co-written with Professor D. Montgomery)
- The Dictionary of Medical Ethics (1977; co-edited with Prof. A. Duncan and Prof. G. Dunstan)

== Affiliations ==
- Fellow, Royal College of Surgeons
- President, Surgical Research Society
- President, British Association of Endocrine Surgeons
- President, International Surgical Group
- Vice-president, Institute of Medical Ethics and the Section of Surgery, RSM
- Visiting research fellow, UCLA (1990, where he wrote The History of Endocrine Surgery

== Awards ==
- The Distinguished Service Award of the International Association of Endocrine Surgeons (Stockholm, 1991)
