= Posey County Courthouse Square =

- U.S. National Register of Historic Places
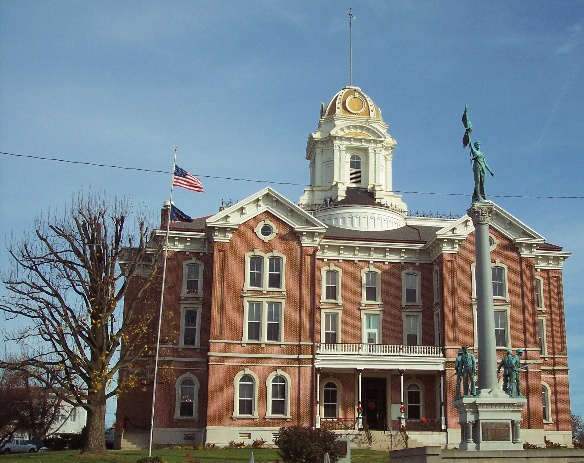
- Posey County Courthouse, November 2007

- Location within Indiana Location within the United States
- Location: 300 Main St., Mount Vernon, Indiana
- Coordinates: 37°55′56″N 87°53′39″W
- Area: less than one acre
- Built: 1874-1876
- Built by: McMannomy, John
- Architect: Vrydagh, Josse A.; Clarke, Levi S.
- Architectural style: Second Empire, Italianate
- NRHP reference No.: 88003042
- Added to NRHP: January 4, 1989

Posey County Courthouse Square is a historic courthouse located at Mount Vernon, Indiana. The courthouse was built between 1874 and 1876, and is a red brick building consisting of a central rectangular mass flanked by two projecting gabled pavilions. It predominantly reflects the Italianate style of architecture with arched windows and brackets. It has Second Empire influences in the segmental pediments and mansard roof of the lantern that tops the domed roof. Also on the property is the contributing Posey County Soldier's and Sailor's Monument (1908).

It was listed on the National Register of Historic Places in 1989.
