= Mount Vernon, Indiana =

- City
- City of Mount Vernon
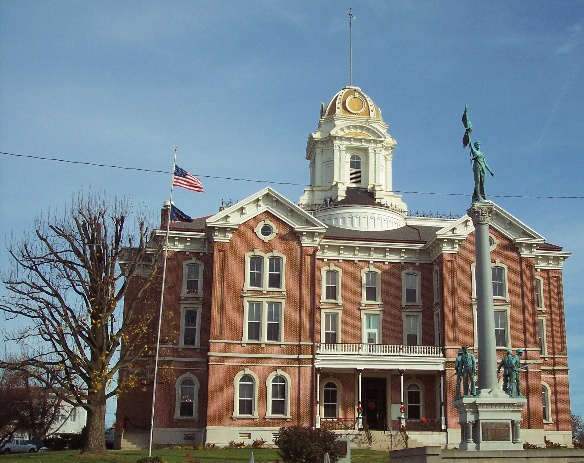
- Posey County Courthouse

- Seal

- Location of Mount Vernon in Posey County, Indiana.
- Coordinates: 37°56′11″N 87°53′45″W
- Country: United States
- State: Indiana
- County: Posey
- Township: Black
- Founded: 1816
- Incorporated: 1832

Government
  - Mayor: Steve Loehr (R)

Area
  - Total: 2.92 sq mi (7.56 km^{2})
  - Land: 2.88 sq mi (7.45 km^{2})
  - Water: 0.042 sq mi (0.11 km^{2}) 1.75%
- Elevation: 413 ft (126 m)

Population (2020)
  - Total: 6,493
  - Density: 2,256.2/sq mi (871.13/km^{2})
- Time zone: UTC-6 (CST)
  - Summer (DST): UTC-5 (CDT)
- ZIP code: 47620
- Area codes: 812, 930
- FIPS code: 18-51732
- GNIS feature ID: 2395128
- Website: www.mountvernonin.gov

Mount Vernon is a city in and the county seat of Posey County, Indiana, United States. Located in the state's far southwestern corner, within 15 miles (24 km) of both the southernmost or westernmost points, it is the westernmost city in the state. The southernmost is Rockport, located along the Ohio River about 40 miles (64 km) to the southeast.

As of the 2020 census, Mount Vernon had a population of 6,493. It is located in Black Township and is part of the Evansville, Indiana, metropolitan area.

== History ==
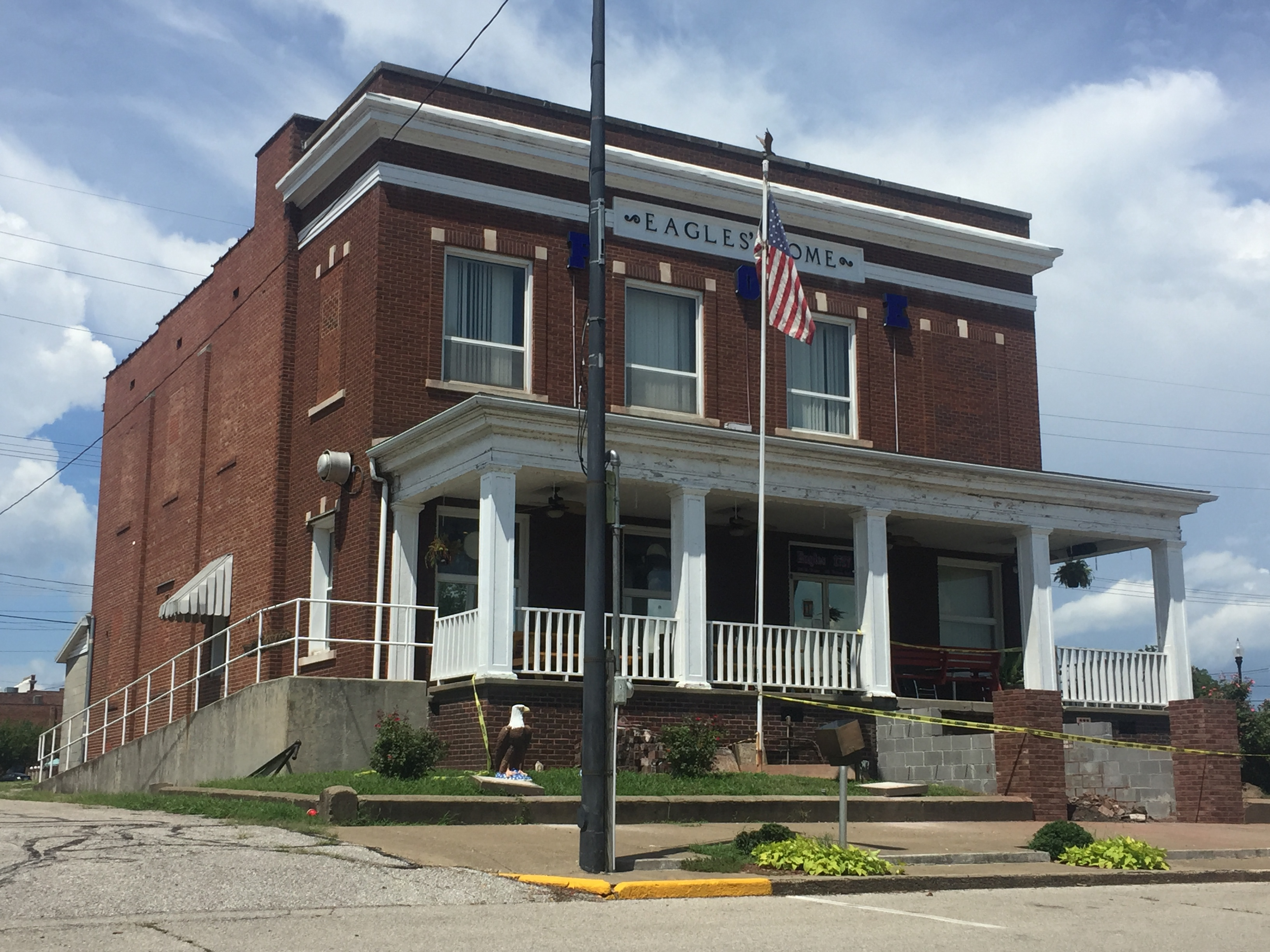
Eagles Home

Mount Vernon is the county seat and largest city in Posey County, named for General Thomas Posey, Governor of the Indiana Territory. He grew up at a plantation adjacent to George Washington's Mount Vernon. He was widely rumored to be Washington's illegitimate son, but this was dismissed by Posey's biographer, John Thornton Posey, a descendant.

The first settler in Mount Vernon was Andrew McFaden in 1806, and the settlement was called McFaden's Bluff. It was platted as Mount Vernon in 1816, but continued to be known as McFadden's Bluff for some time. It was named in honor of Washington's Mount Vernon. A post office called Mount Vernon has been in operation since 1818.

A number of historic sites have been recognized in Mount Vernon, including the Posey County Courthouse Square, Mount Vernon Downtown Historic District, Welborn Historic District and the William Gonnerman House, all of which have been placed on the National Register of Historic Places.

== Geography ==
According to the 2010 census, Mount Vernon has a total area of 2.86 square miles (7.41 km^{2}), of which 2.81 square miles (7.28 km^{2}) (or 98.25%) is land and 0.05 square miles (0.13 km^{2}) (or 1.75%) is water.

=== Climate ===
The climate in this area is characterized by hot, humid summers and generally mild to cool winters. According to the Köppen Climate Classification system, Mount Vernon has a humid subtropical climate, abbreviated "Cfa" on climate maps.

Climate data for Mount Vernon, Indiana (1991–2020 normals, extremes 1893–present)
Month	Jan	Feb	Mar	Apr	May	Jun	Jul	Aug	Sep	Oct	Nov	Dec	Year
Record high °F (°C)	73 (23)	78 (26)	90 (32)	91 (33)	98 (37)	106 (41)	109 (43)	104 (40)	107 (42)	96 (36)	84 (29)	77 (25)	109 (43)
Mean maximum °F (°C)	62.3 (16.8)	67.7 (19.8)	75.0 (23.9)	81.9 (27.7)	87.8 (31.0)	93.7 (34.3)	95.4 (35.2)	95.1 (35.1)	92.8 (33.8)	84.7 (29.3)	73.1 (22.8)	65.0 (18.3)	97.3 (36.3)
Mean daily maximum °F (°C)	41.6 (5.3)	46.0 (7.8)	55.5 (13.1)	67.4 (19.7)	76.7 (24.8)	85.0 (29.4)	87.9 (31.1)	87.3 (30.7)	81.6 (27.6)	70.3 (21.3)	56.6 (13.7)	45.9 (7.7)	66.8 (19.3)
Daily mean °F (°C)	32.3 (0.2)	35.9 (2.2)	44.7 (7.1)	55.5 (13.1)	65.6 (18.7)	74.4 (23.6)	77.3 (25.2)	76.0 (24.4)	69.4 (20.8)	57.9 (14.4)	45.9 (7.7)	36.6 (2.6)	56.0 (13.3)
Mean daily minimum °F (°C)	22.9 (−5.1)	25.7 (−3.5)	33.8 (1.0)	43.7 (6.5)	54.4 (12.4)	63.7 (17.6)	66.6 (19.2)	64.7 (18.2)	57.3 (14.1)	45.4 (7.4)	35.3 (1.8)	27.3 (−2.6)	45.1 (7.3)
Mean minimum °F (°C)	5.5 (−14.7)	11.3 (−11.5)	19.4 (−7.0)	32.0 (0.0)	42.9 (6.1)	54.2 (12.3)	60.4 (15.8)	58.0 (14.4)	45.6 (7.6)	33.0 (0.6)	23.3 (−4.8)	13.2 (−10.4)	3.3 (−15.9)
Record low °F (°C)	−21 (−29)	−19 (−28)	−3 (−19)	21 (−6)	31 (−1)	40 (4)	50 (10)	44 (7)	29 (−2)	22 (−6)	−1 (−18)	−16 (−27)	−21 (−29)
Average precipitation inches (mm)	3.53 (90)	2.93 (74)	4.53 (115)	5.06 (129)	4.98 (126)	4.63 (118)	3.64 (92)	2.95 (75)	3.20 (81)	3.49 (89)	3.89 (99)	3.79 (96)	46.62 (1,184)
Average snowfall inches (cm)	2.4 (6.1)	3.1 (7.9)	1.5 (3.8)	0.0 (0.0)	0.0 (0.0)	0.0 (0.0)	0.0 (0.0)	0.0 (0.0)	0.0 (0.0)	0.2 (0.51)	0.1 (0.25)	1.1 (2.8)	8.4 (21)
Average precipitation days (≥ 0.01 in)	8.8	7.6	10.2	10.5	11.0	9.0	8.1	6.2	6.5	7.3	8.5	9.8	103.5
Average snowy days (≥ 0.1 in)	1.2	1.3	0.6	0.0	0.0	0.0	0.0	0.0	0.0	0.0	0.2	0.6	3.9
Source: NOAA

== Demographics ==
Historical population
Census	Pop.	Note	%±
1850	1,120		—
1860	1,994		78.0%
1870	2,880		44.4%
1880	3,730		29.5%
1890	4,705		26.1%
1900	5,132		9.1%
1910	5,563		8.4%
1920	5,284		−5.0%
1930	5,035		−4.7%
1940	5,638		12.0%
1950	6,150		9.1%
1960	5,970		−2.9%
1970	6,770		13.4%
1980	7,656		13.1%
1990	7,217		−5.7%
2000	7,478		3.6%
2010	6,687		−10.6%
2020	6,493		−2.9%
U.S. Decennial Census

=== 2020 census ===
As of the 2020 census, Mount Vernon had a population of 6,493. The median age was 40.6 years. 23.8% of residents were under the age of 18 and 18.9% of residents were 65 years of age or older. For every 100 females there were 94.2 males, and for every 100 females age 18 and over there were 91.3 males age 18 and over.

100.0% of residents lived in urban areas, while 0.0% lived in rural areas.

There were 2,779 households in Mount Vernon, of which 27.3% had children under the age of 18 living in them. Of all households, 42.4% were married-couple households, 19.7% were households with a male householder and no spouse or partner present, and 31.8% were households with a female householder and no spouse or partner present. About 34.9% of all households were made up of individuals and 15.4% had someone living alone who was 65 years of age or older.

There were 3,095 housing units, of which 10.2% were vacant. The homeowner vacancy rate was 1.5% and the rental vacancy rate was 10.6%.

Racial composition as of the 2020 census
Race	Number	Percent
White	5,865	90.3%
Black or African American	137	2.1%
American Indian and Alaska Native	10	0.2%
Asian	37	0.6%
Native Hawaiian and Other Pacific Islander	0	0.0%
Some other race	69	1.1%
Two or more races	375	5.8%
Hispanic or Latino (of any race)	183	2.8%

=== 2010 census ===
As of the census of 2010, there were 6,687 people, 2,736 households, and 1,819 families residing in the city. The population density was 2,379.7 inhabitants per square mile (918.8/km^{2}). There were 3,077 housing units at an average density of 1,095.0 per square mile (422.8/km^{2}). The racial makeup of the city was 93.4% White, 2.8% African American, 0.3% Native American, 0.4% Asian, 0.8% from other races, and 2.4% from two or more races. Hispanic or Latino of any race were 1.7% of the population.

There were 2,736 households, of which 32.0% had children under the age of 18 living with them, 48.4% were married couples living together, 13.6% had a female householder with no husband present, 4.5% had a male householder with no wife present, and 33.5% were non-families. 29.8% of all households were made up of individuals, and 13% had someone living alone who was 65 years of age or older. The average household size was 2.40 and the average family size was 2.96.

The median age in the city was 40.2 years. 24.5% of residents were under the age of 18; 8.6% were between the ages of 18 and 24; 23.1% were from 25 to 44; 27.1% were from 45 to 64; and 16.8% were 65 years of age or older. The gender makeup of the city was 47.7% male and 52.3% female.

=== 2000 census ===
As of the census of 2000, there were 7,478 people, 3,027 households, and 2,058 families residing in the city. The population density was 3,036.0 inhabitants per square mile (1,172.2/km^{2}). There were 3,312 housing units at an average density of 1,344.7 per square mile (519.2/km^{2}). The racial makeup of the city was 95.85% White, 2.65% African American, 0.16% Native American, 0.23% Asian, 0.25% from other races, and 0.86% from two or more races. Hispanic or Latino of any race were 0.56% of the population.

There were 3,027 households, out of which 33.4% had children under the age of 18 living with them, 52.4% were married couples living together, 12.0% had a female householder with no husband present, and 32.0% were non-families. 28.5% of all households were made up of individuals, and 13.5% had someone living alone who was 65 years of age or older. The average household size was 2.43 and the average family size was 2.97.

In the city the population was spread out, with 26.1% under the age of 18, 8.0% from 18 to 24, 27.9% from 25 to 44, 23.1% from 45 to 64, and 14.8% who were 65 years of age or older. The median age was 38 years. For every 100 females, there were 91.6 males. For every 100 females age 18 and over, there were 88.0 males.

The median income for a household in the city was $36,543, and the median income for a family was $49,432. Males had a median income of $40,045 versus $22,790 for females. The per capita income for the city was $19,264. About 10.5% of families and 12.5% of the population were below the poverty line, including 15.6% of those under age 18 and 13.0% of those age 65 or over.

== Government ==
The city has a mayor-council form of government. The mayor is elected at-large in a citywide vote. The city council consists of five members: four are elected from single-member districts and one is elected at-large.

== Industry ==
Mount Vernon is the headquarters of a small oil refinery owned by the CountryMark agricultural cooperative. Originally built in 1940, it processes more than 20,000 barrels of local crude oil per day.

A former GE Plastics Plant is located here, now owned by Saudi Arabia Basic Industries Corporation (SABIC). Vectren Energy's A.B. Brown Generating Station is located 8 miles east the city.

Mount Vernon is home to two biofuels plants, Abengoa of Indiana and Aventine Renewable Energy. These two facilities helped make Mount Vernon an important energy exporter. The Aventine plant had been developed via partnership with Consolidated Grain and Barge, another company at the port, and was the largest operating ethanol plant east of the Mississippi River. Its nameplate was 110 million gallons of ethanol per year. It was closed in 2012, but it has since resumed operation under Valero Energy ownership.

BWX Technologies (BWXT - formerly Babcock & Wilcox) has a large facility to make large pressure vessels and large metal tubes in Mt. Vernon. This facility produced many components for commercial nuclear plants from the 1960s through 1980s. It now makes heavy-pressure vessels for both commercial and non-commercial power plants. This facility has the largest loading and unloading capacity (1000 tons) on an inland waterway within 500 miles (800 km).

The Mount Vernon port is the largest port for coal shipments in the U.S. and the 7th-largest inland port. The John T. Myers Locks and Dam, located 13 miles (21 km) SW of Mount Vernon, was constructed to improve navigation and flood control on the Ohio River. It is important to shipping for the region's river-based industries.

== Local media ==
Mount Vernon is left without a newspaper, with The Posey County News out of northern Posey county serving as the county's only newspaper. It is represented by the radio stations WPIW AM 1590 and WMVI FM 106.7. Mount Vernon previously (circa 1867-6/24/2020) had “ The Mount Vernon Democrat “ as the town's main newspaper until economic effects of the COVID-19 pandemic led to the Mount Vernon Democrat stopping its publication with its June 24, 2020, edition. Landmark Community Newspapers acquired the Democrat in 1979. It was established in 1867 and covered Mount Vernon and the surrounding communities of Posey County, Indiana.

== Schools ==
The city and southern half of Posey County is served by the M.S.D. of Mount Vernon which currently operates 5 schools:

- Mount Vernon High School (9–12)
- Mount Vernon Junior High (6–8)
- Farmersville Elementary School (K–5)
- Marrs Elementary School (K–5)
- West Elementary School (K–5)
- St Matthew's School (K–5) is operated under the auspices of the Diocese of Evansville

== Public library ==
The Alexandrian Public Library serves the residents of Mount Vernon, Indiana, as well as Black, Lynn, Marrs, Point, and Robinson townships (approximately 21,000 residents).

The Main Library, built in 1986, is located at 115 West Fifth Street. It has more than 100,000 items, a dozen public computers, and free Wi-Fi. In addition, a bookmobile operates to serve the area schools and outlying areas of the county.

A monthly book discussion group for adults, numerous storytimes, a Summer Reading Program, targeted programming for youth, young adult and adults are all offered free of charge to the public on a regular basis.

The Alexandrian Public Library has a collection of local history resources and family history files in the "Indiana Room" of the Main Library. Microfilmed newspapers, contributed family documents, resources from the Posey County Historical Society, and more are available.

Meeting rooms are available for use by the public at the library. Non-profit groups may use the rooms free of charge, and for-profit groups are charged $5/hour.

The Alexandrian Public Library is open 9am-8pm Monday through Thursday, 9am-5pm on Friday and Saturday, and 1pm-5pm on Sunday.

== Transportation ==
=== Highways ===
- Indiana State Road 62
- Indiana State Road 69

=== Rail service ===
- Evansville Western Railway, a short-line railroad serving area industries both in Indiana and Illinois, is headquartered in Mount Vernon.

=== River port ===
- Ports of Indiana-Mount Vernon, a major public riverport, is located just east of Mount Vernon. It began operation in 1976 as Southwind Maritime Center. It is one of three and the largest public port operated by the state of Indiana.

== Notable people ==
- Matilda Greathouse Alexander (1842–1904) Born and raised in Mount Vernon, was an American novelist, poet, and journalist, best known for the novel Going West (1881). The Alexandrian Public Library in Mount Vernon is named in her honor.
- Everett O. Alldredge (1912–1973) Born and raised in Mount Vernon, was an American archivist and records manager, and a leader in the American archival community.
- Richard Cannon (1909–1935) A native of Mount Vernon, he was an American Negro League pitcher from 1928 to 1932. Was referred to as "Speedball".
- H. Joel Deckard (1942–2016) Born in Vandalia, Illinois, Deckard attended public schools in Mount Vernon. He served as member of the Indiana House of Representatives from 1966 to 1974 and was later elected to the US House of Representatives, serving from 1979 to 1983.
- Francis C. Green (1835–1905), born and raised in Mount Vernon, he was a US Army soldier who served with the 8th U.S. Cavalry during the Indian Wars. He was awarded the Medal of Honor in 1869.
- Philip Hagemann (1932–) Born in Mount Vernon, he is an American composer and conductor.
- William Harrow (1822–1871), Union general during the Civil War. Born in Winchester, Kentucky, he lived in Mount Vernon and is buried in Bellefontaine Cemetery just north of town.
- Alvin P. Hovey (1821–1891), Union general during the Civil War and Governor of Indiana 1889–1891. Born in Mount Vernon and is buried in Bellefontaine Cemetery.
- Ann Hovey (1911–2007), Born and raised in Mount Vernon, she became an actress, appearing in several B-movies in the 1930s.
- Anna Byford Leonard (1843–1930), Born in Mount Vernon, she was an American reformer, and the first woman appointed as sanitary inspector.
- Frederick Charles Leonard (1896–1960), Born and raised in Mount Vernon, he became an astronomer and faculty member at the University of California, Los Angeles.
- Thomas Gamble Pitcher (1824–1895), Lived in Mount Vernon; he served as a Union general in the Civil War and was an 1845 graduate of the United States Military Academy
- Trent Van Haaften (1964–) A native of Mount Vernon, he served as a member of the Indiana House of Representatives, representing the 76th District, from 2003 until 2010. He ran, unsuccessfully, for his old seat in 2012.
- William Edward Wilson (1870–1948), Born and raised in Mount Vernon, he was a U.S. Representative from Indiana, serving from 1923 to 1925.

== See also ==
- List of cities and towns along the Ohio River
- List of North American ports
