= Eagles Building (Dayton, Ohio) =

- U.S. National Register of Historic Places
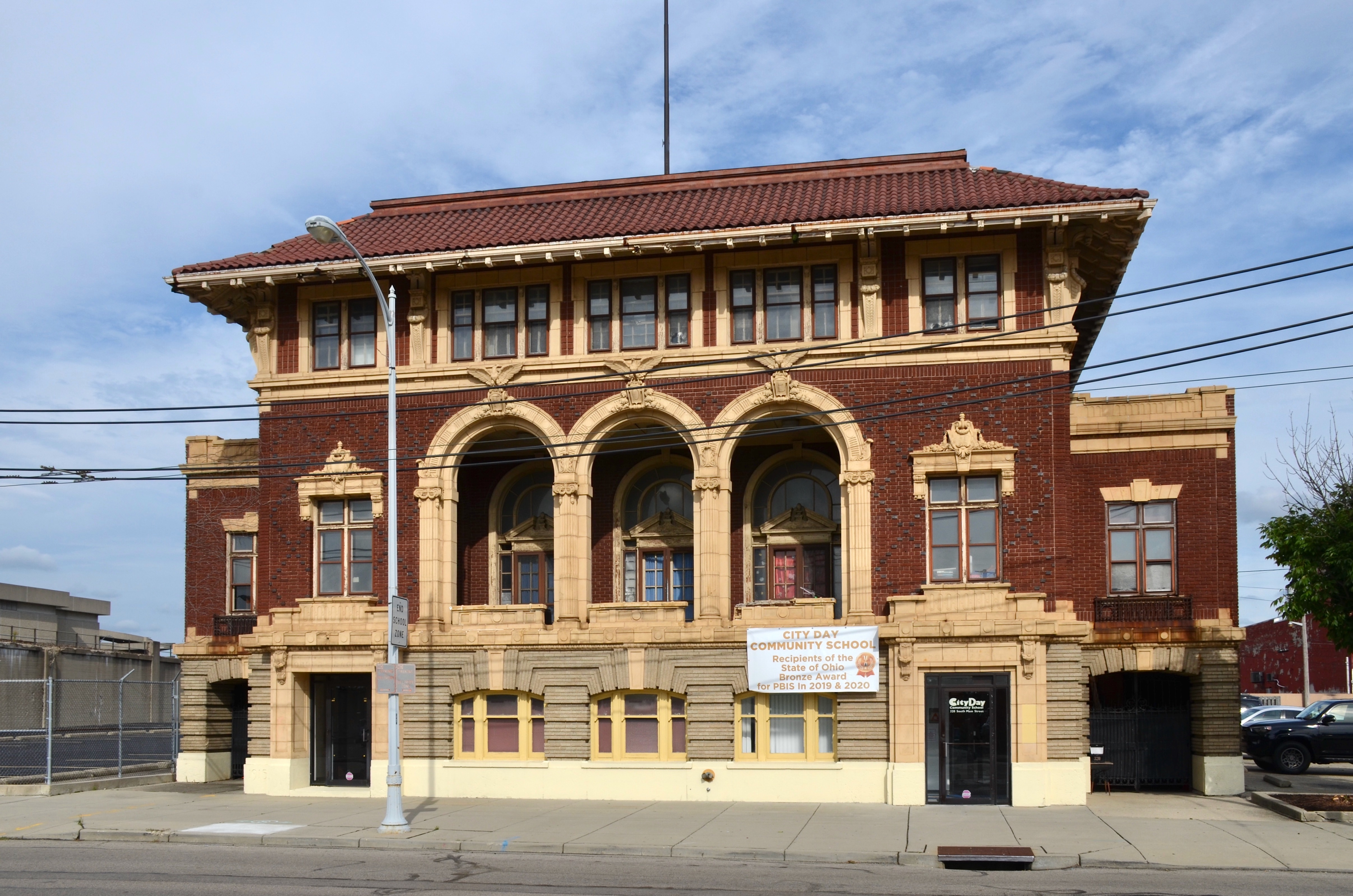
- Front in 2021

- Location within Ohio Location within the United States
- Location: Dayton, Ohio
- Coordinates: 39°45′17″N 84°11′24″W
- Built: 1916
- Architect: Albert A. Pretzinger
- Architectural style: Prairie School, Renaissance
- NRHP reference No.: 82001478
- Added to NRHP: November 4, 1982

The Eagles Building is an historic Fraternal Order of Eagles meeting hall-office building located at 320 South Main Street in Dayton, Ohio. Built in 1916, it is also known as the City Mission. On November 4, 1982, it was added to the National Register of Historic Places.

== See also ==
- National Register of Historic Places listings in Dayton, Ohio
