= Donald Welbourn =

British engineer (1916–2009)

Donald B Welbourn
- Born: 1916; England
- Died: 3 March 2009 (aged 92–93)
- Occupations: Engineer, academic

Donald Welbourn FREng was an English engineer, and a pioneer of computer-aided design and computer-aided manufacturing (CAD/CAM) research and development in the United Kingdom.

== Early life ==
Welbourn was educated at Emmanuel College, Cambridge (BA 1937), and became a University Lecturer in 1952.

== CAD/CAM ==
Welbourn was a key pioneer of CADCAM research and development in the UK. After initial work at Cambridge, Lord Caldecote, chairman of the Delta Group plc, persuaded him to help the group. This help led to the formation Delcam in 1989.

== Personal life ==
Welbourn was married to Esther, Fellow of New Hall, Cambridge, predeceased him in 2001. He leaves a daughter, Ann with grandchildren Fiona and Ian, and a son, Hugh.

== Additional sources ==
- Donald Welbourn
- https://web.archive.org/web/20111106061744/http://www.delcam.com/general/about/history.asp
