= Eagles Home (Evansville, Indiana) =

- U.S. National Register of Historic Places
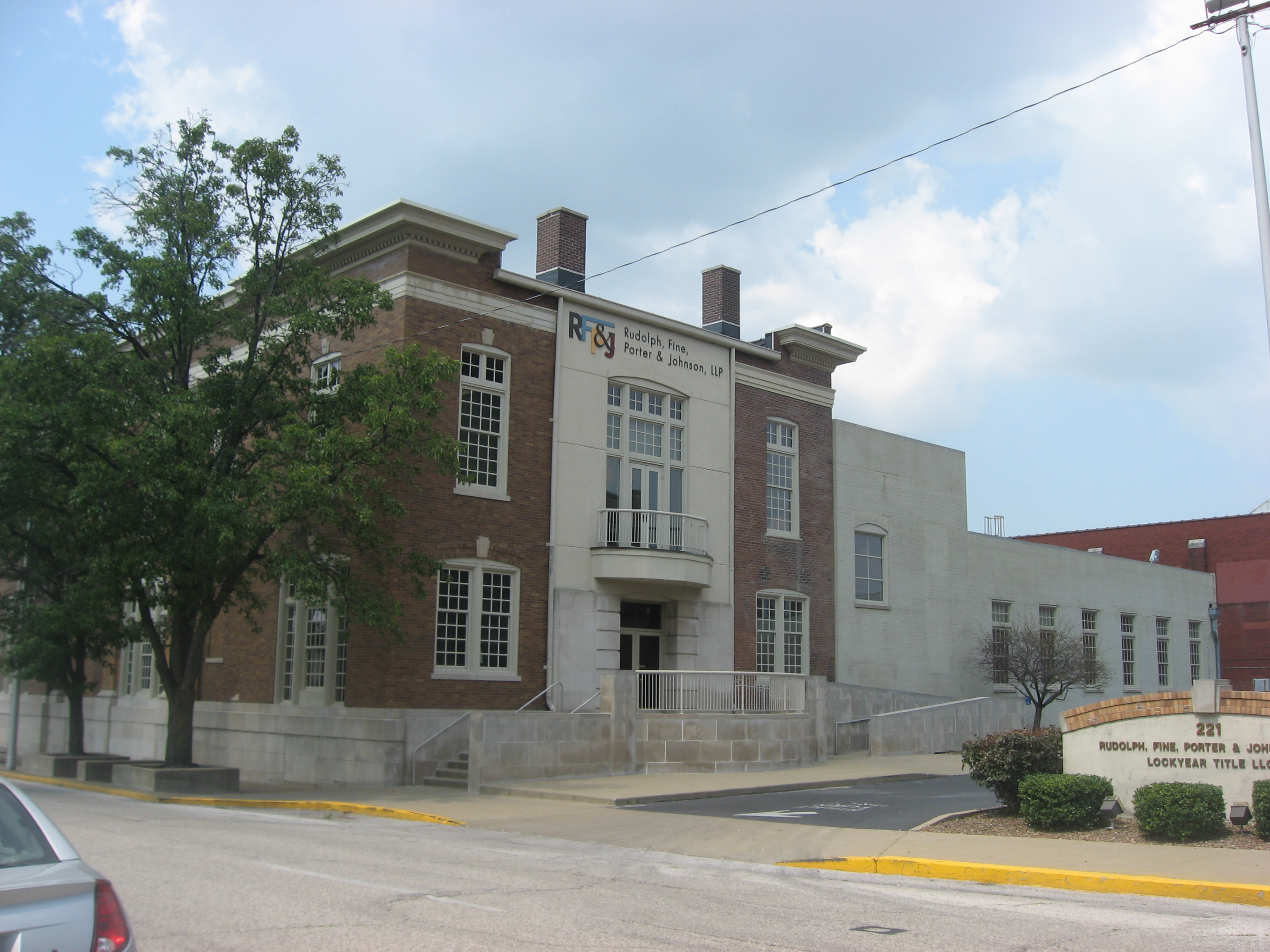
- Front and side of the Eagles Home
- Location: 221 NW 5th St., Evansville, Indiana
- Coordinates: 37°58′27″N 87°34′18″W
- Area: less than one acre
- Built: 1912
- Architect: Boyle, Harry E.
- MPS: Downtown Evansville MRA
- NRHP reference No.: 82000090
- Added to NRHP: July 1, 1982

The Eagles Home is a historic building located in Evansville, Indiana. It was designed by Evansville architect Harry Boyle and was built in 1912. It has served as a clubhouse, college, and law firm at various points throughout its history. The building was added to the National Register of Historic Places in 1982, and most recently served as the Evansville office of the Jackson Kelly law firm.

== Fraternal Order of Eagles ==
The building was designed by Evansville architect Harry Boyle and was constructed in 1912 for a local chapter of the Fraternal Order of Eagles. Originally made up of those engaged in one way or another in the performing arts, the Eagles grew and claimed credit for establishing the Mother's Day holiday in the United States as well as the impetus for Social Security. Their lodges are known as "aeries". The organization's success is also attributed to its funeral benefits (no Eagle was ever buried in a potter's field), the provision of an aerie physician, and other membership benefits.

The local chapter was successful enough that in 1940 a rear addition was completed on the building, giving the building 32,000 square feet on three floors. By 1965 the group began discussions about moving to a new location. However, the Eagles' racially restrictive membership policies caused delays in a proposed move to another downtown location. (Note: At one point the qualifications for membership were that one must be 21 years old, possess a good character, not be a Communist and be a Caucasian. By the late 1970s the all white provision had officially been rescinded, but, because the Order used the blackball to admit new members, it was difficult for minorities to gain membership. In 1979 the FOE tried to get a lawsuit dismissed that alleged it was violating the Civil Rights Act of 1964 by not allowing African Americans to use their athletic facilities.) By 1968 it had identified a new location at a building on a 21-acre tract just west of Burkhardt Road on Boonville Highway.

== Lockyear Business College ==
By the late nineteenth-century, a few business colleges operated in downtown Evansville, probably spurred by the recent invention of the typewriter. Melvin H. Lockyear co-founded Columbian Business College at Second and Main streets in 1893, and four years later the school was incorporated as Lockyear Business College. The school relocated to 209 NW Fifth St. where a new facility was built in 1911 (immediately adjacent to the Eagles Home in what is now a parking lot). In 1968 the college acquired the Eagles Home nearby and used it as the students' union.

Besides offering traditional business courses, the Lockyear Business College offered a popular Dale Carnegie salesmanship development program that graduated over 6,000 by 1962. Lockyear was approaching its centennial when it closed in April 1991 after the school's owners filed for Chapter 11 bankruptcy. In March 1992 the Eagles Home building was sold to National City Bank at a sheriff's sale after foreclosing on $400,000 in loans made to former officials of Lockyear. The original college building was razed in 1993 to make way for a 41-space courtyard parking lot, but the Eagles Home remained standing.

== Professional and law office use ==
In 1994, the building was converted into office space and used by an accounting group and a law firm. About 6,500 square feet was occupied by Kemper CPA Group. About 5,700 square feet on the second floor was used by the law firm of Mattingly, Rudolph, Fine and Porter (later more commonly known as Rudolph, Fine, Porter & Johnson, LLP ("RFPJ") until 2014 which merged with the Jackson Kelly law firm). By 2006, the entire building was occupied by RFPJ and Lockyear Title until the merge with Jackson Kelly.
