= Gibson-Pike-Warrick Special Education Cooperative =

School district in Indiana

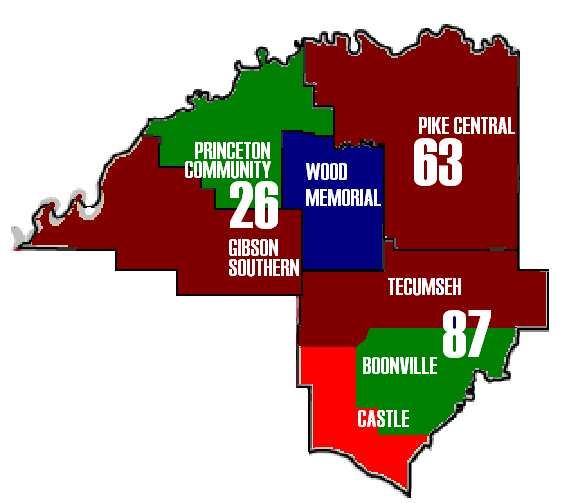
The three counties and five school districts of the GPW Special Education Cooperative. The districts are shaded by high school conferences.

The Gibson-Pike-Warrick Special Education Cooperative was a three-county special education cooperative, based in Oakland City, Indiana, that provided education for handicapped and disabled students in Gibson, Pike, and Warrick Counties in Southwestern Indiana. It operated its own system of buses designed for handicapped children and teenagers independently of the school corporations. Starting in 2011, each school corporation, starting with Warrick County, began assuming the function of the cooperative, essentially ending it.

It was supported by the following school districts:

Gibson County
Office: 114 N. Grove St., Oakland City, Indiana

- East Gibson School Corporation
  - Wood Memorial Jr./Sr. High School
- North Gibson School Corporation
  - Princeton Community Middle School
  - Princeton Community High School
- South Gibson School Corporation
  - Fort Branch Community School
  - Gibson Southern High School

Pike County
Office: 618 East Main St., Petersburg, Indiana

- Pike County School Corporation
  - Pike Central Middle School
  - Pike Central High School

Warrick County - pulled out of the coop in 2011
Office: 600 East Gum St., Boonville, Indiana

- Warrick County School Corporation
  - Boonville Middle School
  - Boonville High School
  - Castle Middle School
  - John H. Castle High School
  - Tecumseh Junior – Senior High School
