= Gus Doerner =

American basketball player and coach (1922–2001)

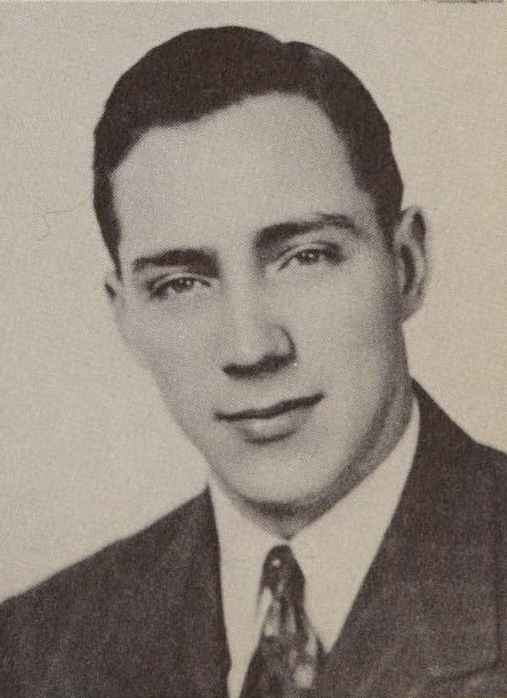
- Doerner in 1942

Personal information
- Born: February 27, 1922 Mackey, Indiana, U.S.
- Died: December 10, 2001 (aged 79) Evansville, Indiana, U.S.
- Listed height: 6 ft 2 in (1.88 m)
- Listed weight: 190 lb (86 kg)

Career information
- High school: Mackey (Mackey, Indiana)
- College: Evansville (1939–1942)
- Playing career: 1942–1947
- Position: Forward

Career history

Playing
- 1942–1943, 1945–1946: Fort Wayne Zollner Pistons
- 1946–1947: Indianapolis Kautskys

Coaching
- 19??–19??: Fort Branch HS

Career highlights
- 3× NBL champion (1944, 1945, 1947); NAIA tournament MVP (1942); Consensus second-team All-American (1942); No. 19 jersey retired by Evansville Purple Aces

Wilfred Otto "Gus" Doerner (February 27, 1922 – December 10, 2001) was an American professional basketball player for the Fort Wayne Pistons and Indianapolis Kautskys of the National Basketball League (NBL). He won two championships with the Pistons and one with the Kautskys, although he is best known for his career at Evansville College.

A native of Evansville, Indiana, Doerner attended Mackey High School and was a stand-out basketball player. In three years on the team, he earned all-county and all-sectional accolades twice apiece, and in his senior year was named a team captain. When he graduated in 1938, he decided to stay close to home and attend Evansville College (later the University of Evansville). He played on the Purple Aces basketball team for all four years, lettering each season.

Doerner was a 6 ft 2 in (1.88 m) forward and had a breakout senior season in 1941–42. That year, he recorded the third-highest scoring average in the nation and led Indiana collegians in scoring for the second time. He guided Evansville to the 1942 NAIA Division I men's basketball tournament where they would lose in the second round. He was named to the all-tournament team and was also selected as the NAIA Tournament MVP. Doerner became the first Evansville player to receive All-America status when he was honored as a consensus Second Team All-American selection.

After college he played in the NBL, the only viable professional basketball league in the United States at the time. From 1942 to 1946, Doerner played on the Fort Wayne Zollner Pistons and won two league championships. He then played for the Indianapolis Kautskys and won one more NBL championship.

In his later life he was a basketball coach at Fort Branch High School in Fort Branch, Indiana and won one sectional title. Doerner was inducted into the Indiana Basketball Hall of Fame for his success at the high school, college and professional levels of basketball, all within the state of Indiana.
