= Buckskin, Indiana =

- Unincorporated community
- Location within Indiana Location within the United States
- Coordinates: 38°13′42″N 87°24′43″W
- Country: United States
- State: Indiana
- County: Gibson
- Township: Barton
- Elevation: 459 ft (140 m)

Population (2007)
  - Total: 79
- Time zone: UTC-6 (Central Standard)
  - Summer (DST): UTC-5 (Central Daylight)
- ZIP code: 47647
- Area code: 812
- FIPS code: 18-08848
- GNIS feature ID: 431754

Buckskin is a census designated place in Barton Township, Gibson County, Indiana. Although unincorporated, Buckskin has the ZIP code 47647.

A post office was established at Buckskin in 1847, and remained in operation until it was discontinued in 1989.

== Geography ==
Buckskin is located at 38°13′42″N 87°24′43″W. Nearby towns are Mackey and Somerville.

== Demographics ==
The United States Census Bureau delineated Buckskin as a census designated place in the 2022 American Community Survey.

== Schools ==
Buckskin and the easternmost half of Gibson County is served by the East Gibson School Corporation which currently operates five schools:

- Wood Memorial High School (9–12)
- Wood Memorial Junior High School (7–8)
- Oakland City Elementary School (PK–6)
- Francisco Elementary School (K–6)
- Barton Township Elementary School (K–6)
