= Somerville, Indiana =

- Town
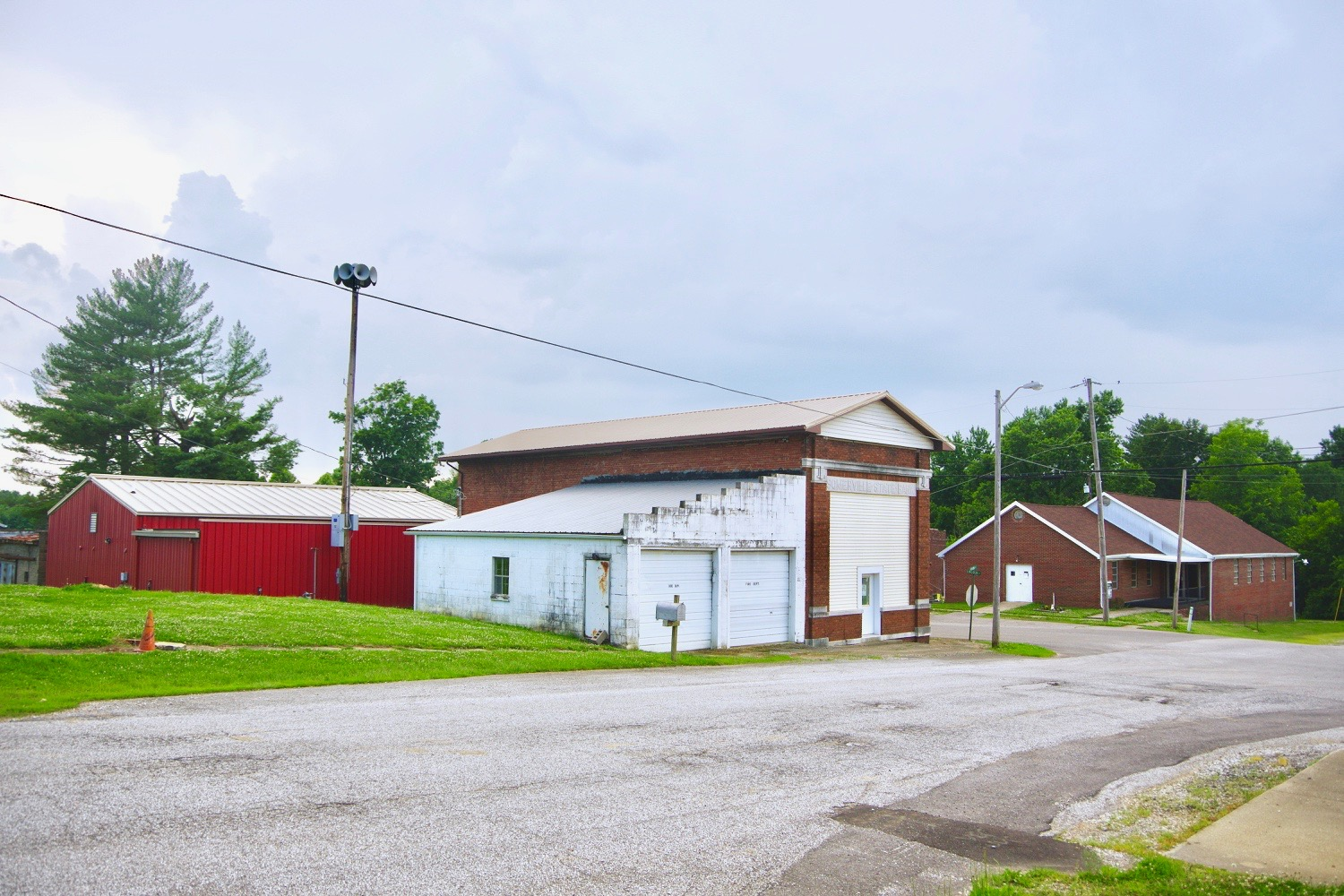
- Somerville

- Location of Somerville in Gibson County, Indiana.
- Coordinates: 38°16′43″N 87°22′37″W
- Country: United States
- State: Indiana
- County: Gibson
- Township: Barton

Area
  - Total: 0.36 sq mi (0.93 km^{2})
  - Land: 0.36 sq mi (0.93 km^{2})
  - Water: 0 sq mi (0.00 km^{2})
- Elevation: 482 ft (147 m)

Population (2020)
  - Total: 253
  - Density: 708.0/sq mi (273.37/km^{2})
- Time zone: UTC-6 (Central (CST))
  - Summer (DST): UTC-5 (CDT)
- ZIP code: 47683
- Area codes: 812, 930
- FIPS code: 18-70542
- GNIS feature ID: 2397665

Somerville is a town in Barton Township, Gibson County, Indiana, United States. As of the 2020 census, Somerville had a population of 253, making it the third-smallest community in the county.

== History ==
Somerville was originally called Summittville, and under the latter name was laid out in 1853. The post office opened as Somerville in 1854.

== Geography ==
Somerville lies northeast of Evansville in eastern Gibson County. State Road 57 passes through Somerville, connecting the town with Oakland City to the northeast and Mackey to the southwest.

According to the 2010 census, Somerville has a total area of 0.312 square mile (0.81 km^{2}), of which 0.31 square mile (0.80 km^{2}) (or 99.36%) is land and 0.002 square mile (0.01 km^{2}) (or 0.64%) is water.

== Schools ==
Somerville and the easternmost half of Gibson County is served by the East Gibson School Corporation which currently operates five schools:

- Wood Memorial High School (9–12)
- Wood Memorial Junior High School (6–8)
- Wood Memorial Intermediate School (3–5)
- Wood Memorial Elementary School (K–2)

== Demographics ==
Historical population
Census	Pop.	Note	%±
1930	273		—
1940	373		36.6%
1950	353		−5.4%
1960	317		−10.2%
1970	313		−1.3%
1980	340		8.6%
1990	223		−34.4%
2000	312		39.9%
2010	293		−6.1%
2020	253		−13.7%
U.S. Decennial Census

=== 2010 census ===
As of the census of 2010, there were 293 people, 110 households, and 78 families living in the town. The population density was 915.6 inhabitants per square mile (353.5/km^{2}). There were 121 housing units at an average density of 378.1 per square mile (146.0/km^{2}). The racial makeup of the town was 98.6% White, 0.3% African American, 0.3% Native American, 0.3% from other races, and 0.3% from two or more races. Hispanic or Latino of any race were 2.4% of the population.

There were 110 households, of which 32.7% had children under the age of 18 living with them, 56.4% were married couples living together, 9.1% had a female householder with no husband present, 5.5% had a male householder with no wife present, and 29.1% were non-families. 25.5% of all households were made up of individuals, and 9% had someone living alone who was 65 years of age or older. The average household size was 2.66 and the average family size was 3.15.

The median age in the town was 36.9 years. 28.3% of residents were under the age of 18; 7.6% were between the ages of 18 and 24; 23.2% were from 25 to 44; 24.5% were from 45 to 64; and 16.4% were 65 years of age or older. The gender makeup of the town was 50.9% male and 49.1% female.

=== 2000 census ===
As of the census of 2000, there were 312 people, 124 households, and 81 families living in the town. The population density was 1,061.5 inhabitants per square mile (409.8/km^{2}). There were 132 housing units at an average density of 449.1 per square mile (173.4/km^{2}). The racial makeup of the town was 99.04% White, 0.64% African American, 0.32% from other races. Hispanic or Latino of any race were 0.32% of the population.

There were 124 households, out of which 28.2% had children under the age of 18 living with them, 59.7% were married couples living together, 5.6% had a female householder with no husband present, and 33.9% were non-families. 30.6% of all households were made up of individuals, and 16.9% had someone living alone who was 65 years of age or older. The average household size was 2.52 and the average family size was 3.18.

In the town, the population was spread out, with 24.7% under the age of 18, 4.8% from 18 to 24, 30.8% from 25 to 44, 24.4% from 45 to 64, and 15.4% who were 65 years of age or older. The median age was 40 years. For every 100 females, there were 89.1 males. For every 100 females age 18 and over, there were 86.5 males.

The median income for a household in the town was $34,464, and the median income for a family was $43,750. Males had a median income of $30,750 versus $22,083 for females. The per capita income for the town was $12,147. About 3.3% of families and 5.2% of the population were below the poverty line, including 4.3% of those under age 18 and 7.9% of those age 65 or over.
