= Columbia Township, Gibson County, Indiana =

Columbia Township Gibson County
- Township
- Location in Gibson County
- Coordinates: 38°20′07″N 87°21′42″W
- Country: United States
- State: Indiana
- County: Gibson
- Township Seat: Oakland City
- School District: East Gibson School Corporation

Government
  - Type: Indiana township
  - Trustee: Shannon Green

Area
  - Total: 31.03 sq mi (80.4 km^{2})
  - Land: 30.49 sq mi (79.0 km^{2})
  - Water: 0.55 sq mi (1.4 km^{2})
- Elevation: 489 ft (149 m)

Population (2020)
  - Total: 3,539
  - Density: 116.1/sq mi (44.82/km^{2})
- Time zone: UTC-6 (CST)
  - Summer (DST): UTC-5 (CDT)
- ZIP code: 47660
- Area code: 812
- FIPS code: 18-14662
- GNIS feature ID: 453240

Columbia Township is one of ten townships in Gibson County, Indiana. As of the 2020 census, its population was 3,539 (down from 3,830 at 2010) and it contained 1,757 housing units. Oakland City is the township seat.

Columbia Township was established in 1825.

Historical population
Census	Pop.	Note	%±
1890	3,014		—
1900	3,465		15.0%
1910	3,588		3.5%
1920	3,296		−8.1%
1930	3,908		18.6%
1940	4,154		6.3%
1950	4,766		14.7%
1960	4,158		−12.8%
1970	4,603		10.7%
1980	4,717		2.5%
1990	4,244		−10.0%
2000	4,149		−2.2%
2010	3,830		−7.7%
2020	3,539		−7.6%
Source: US Decennial Census

== Geography ==
According to the 2010 census, the township has a total area of 31.03 square miles (80.4 km^{2}), of which 30.49 square miles (79.0 km^{2}) (or 98.26%) is land and 0.55 square miles (1.4 km^{2}) (or 1.77%) is water.

=== Cities and towns ===
- Oakland City

=== Unincorporated towns ===
- Dongola
- Gray Junction
- Oak Hill

(This list is based on USGS data and may include former settlements.)

=== Adjacent townships ===
Gibson County

- Barton Township (south)
- Center Township (west)

Pike County

- Logan Township (north)
- Patoka Township (east)
- Monroe Township (southeast)

=== Cemeteries ===
The township contains one cemetery, Montgomery.

=== Major highways ===
- I-69
- SR 57
- SR 64
- SR 357

== Education ==
Columbia Township is the center of the East Gibson School Corporation.

=== Primary and secondary schools ===
- Oakland City Elementary
- Waldo J. Wood Memorial Jr/Sr High School

=== Higher education ===
- Oakland City University - Main Campus

=== Public library ===
Columbia Township residents may request a free library card at the Oakland City-Columbia Township Public Library in Oakland City.
