= Port Gibson, Indiana =

Coordinates: 38.3701°N 87.5106°W

Port Gibson is a former community in Gibson County, Indiana, in the United States located northeast of present-day Fort Branch in Union Township. The present site is a collection of farm houses located just southeast of Toyota Motor Manufacturing Indiana.

== History ==
Port Gibson was platted in 1852 when the Wabash and Erie Canal was extended to that point. It declined shortly thereafter with the advent of the railroad.

A post office was established at Port Gibson in 1852, and remained in operation until it was discontinued in 1863. Many older maps show the settlement in Patoka Township, prior to the establishment of Union Township in 1890.
