= Southern Indiana Career & Technical Center =

Coordinates: 38°00′42″N 87°31′45″W

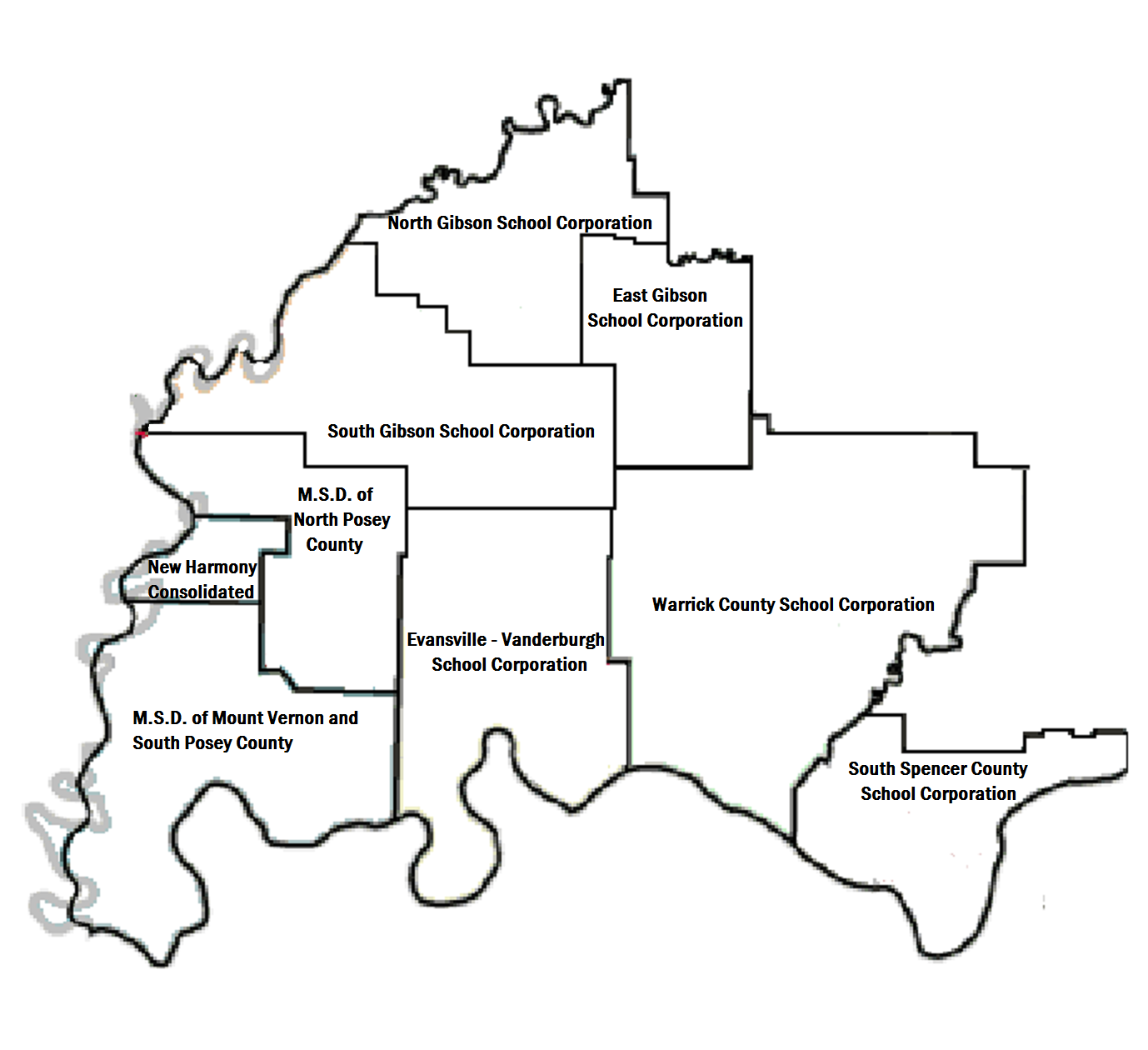
- Indiana's Area Career & Technical District #46 the area served by the Southern Indiana Career & Technical Center.

Location
- 1901 Lynch Road; Evansville, Indiana 47711; USA

Information
- Type: High School Career and Technical Education
- Established: 2006
- Director: Kevin Williams
- Faculty: 32
- Grades: 11-12
- Enrollment: 1000
- Counties Served: Gibson, Posey, Spencer (part), Vanderburgh, and Warrick

The Southern Indiana Career & Technical Center is a high school-level institution that provides advanced education to meet the demand in the areas of agriculture, business and marketing, family and consumer sciences, health careers, and trade and industry arts to the students in Indiana's Area Career & Technical District #46 (ACTD-46) consisting of nine school district and corporations in Gibson, Posey, Spencer, Vanderburgh and Warrick Counties in Southwestern Indiana. 90.7 FM WPSR, which used to broadcast from Central High School, now broadcasts from the center.

To provide easier access to these services to the Evansville Vanderburgh School Corporation along with the other eight districts the facility was constructed outside the city of Evansville. In terms of enrollment, the EVSC has one of the largest CTE programs in the State of Indiana. Other than the EVSC the Southern Indiana Career and Technical Center draws Students from the following School Districts in Southwestern Indiana.

Gibson County

- East Gibson
- North Gibson
- South Gibson

Posey County

- MSD of Mt. Vernon
- MSD of North Posey

Spencer County

- South Spencer

Warrick County

- Warrick County

The new facility is located on Lynch Road just east of U.S. 41. The Southern Indiana Career & Technical Center also draws students from schools such as Mater Dei High School, Reitz Memorial High School, Evansville Christian High School, and many more.

The Southern Indiana Career & Technical Center offers classes within 6 career pathways: Communications, Construction, Transportation, Manufacturing, Public Service, and Architecture, Engineering & Computer Technology.

== Resources ==
- The Southern Indiana Career and Technical Center
