= Dongola (disambiguation) =

Dongola is a city in Sudan.

Dongola may also refer to:

== Places ==
- Dongola, Illinois, a village in Union County
- Dongola, Indiana, an unincorporated community in Gibson County
- Dongola, Missouri, an unincorporated community in Bollinger County
- Dongola, Ontario, an unincorporated community
- Old Dongola, a deserted town in Sudan

== Other ==
- SS Dongola, a P&O liner launched in 1905
- Dongola (horse), a riding horse native to Africa
- Dongola racing, a popular event in traditional local regattas
- A type of kidskin
