= Union Township, Gibson County, Indiana =

Union Township Gibson County
- Township
- Location of Union Township within Gibson County
- Coordinates: 38°14′47″N 87°33′19″W
- Country: United States
- State: Indiana
- County: Gibson
- Township Seat: Fort Branch
- School District: South Gibson School Corporation
- Named for: The Union

Government
  - Type: Indiana township
  - Trustee: Jessica Kramer

Area
  - Total: 50.43 sq mi (130.6 km^{2})
  - Land: 50.31 sq mi (130.3 km^{2})
  - Water: 0.12 sq mi (0.31 km^{2})
- Elevation: 456 ft (139 m)

Population (2020)
  - Total: 4,399
  - Density: 87.44/sq mi (33.76/km^{2})
- Time zone: UTC-6 (CST)
  - Summer (DST): UTC-5 (CDT)
- ZIP code: 47648
- Area code: 812
- FIPS code: 18-77300
- GNIS feature ID: 453916

Union Township is one of ten townships in Gibson County, Indiana. As of the 2020 census, its population was 4,399 (up from 4,197 at 2010) and it contained 1,938 housing units, more than 90% of which live either within or in areas adjacent to the town of Fort Branch. Fort Branch is the township seat. Nearly all of the Toyota Motor Manufacturing Indiana Complex is located within Union Township.

Union Township was established in 1890.

Historical population
Census	Pop.	Note	%±
1900	2,149		—
1910	2,507		16.7%
1920	2,519		0.5%
1930	2,378		−5.6%
1940	2,707		13.8%
1950	3,192		17.9%
1960	3,529		10.6%
1970	3,788		7.3%
1980	4,197		10.8%
1990	4,031		−4.0%
2000	3,954		−1.9%
2010	4,197		6.1%
2020	4,399		4.8%
Source: US Decennial Census

== Geography ==
According to the 2010 census, the township has a total area of 50.43 square miles (130.6 km^{2}), of which 50.31 square miles (130.3 km^{2}) (or 99.76%) is land and 0.12 square miles (0.31 km^{2}) (or 0.24%) is water.

=== Cities and towns ===
- Fort Branch

=== Unincorporated towns ===
- Durham (extinct)
- Port Gibson (extinct)
- Snake Run

=== Adjacent townships ===
- Patoka Township (north)
- Center Township (northeast)
- Barton Township (east)
- Johnson Township (south)
- Montgomery Township (west)

=== Cemeteries ===
The township contains three cemeteries: Durham, Mount Mariah and Walnut Hill.

=== Major highways ===
- Interstate 69; Traverses the southeastern corner of the township
- U.S. Route 41; Bisects the township from south to north
- State Road 168; bisects the township from west to east.

== Education ==
Union Township is the center of the South Gibson School Corporation.

=== Public schools ===
- Fort Branch Community School
- Gibson Southern High School

=== Higher Education ===
- Vincennes University Advanced Manufacturing Campus

=== Private schools ===
- Holy Cross Catholic Academy - Fort Branch
