= North Gibson School Corporation =

School district in Indiana

Location
- Princeton, Indiana Southwestern Indiana; Gibson County United States

District information
- Grades: K-12
- Superintendent: Dr. Eric Goggins
- Asst. superintendent(s): Mr. Noah Velthouse

Students and staff
- Students: 2,023
- Athletic conference: Pocket Athletic
- District mascot: Tigers, Tiger Cubs
- Colors: All are Red & White

Other information
- Graduation Rate: 82.1%
- 2008 Graduates: 121
- Website: www.ngsc.k12.in.us

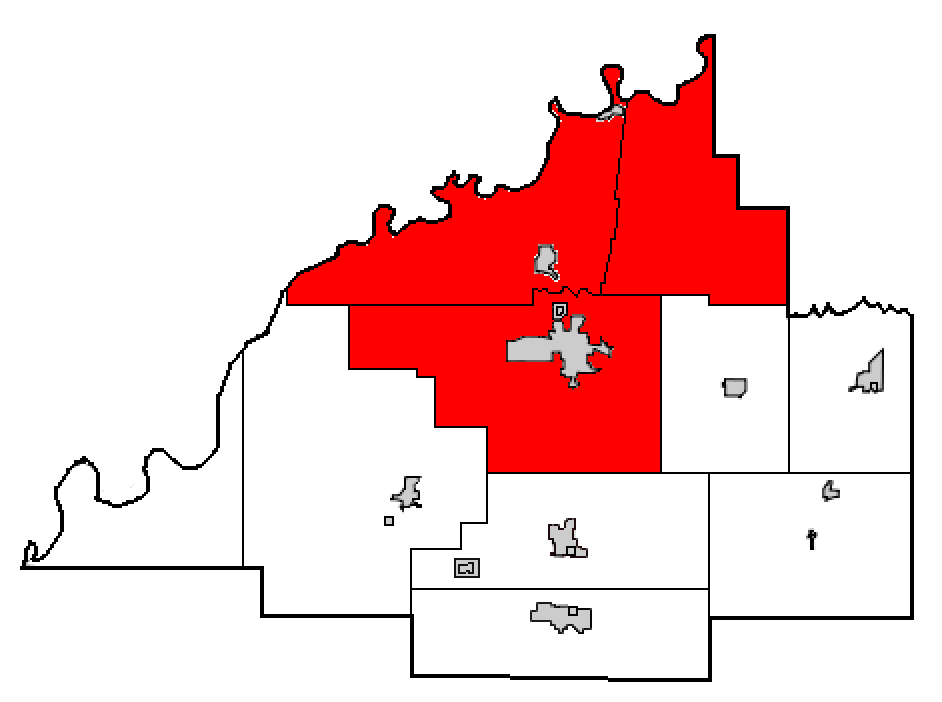
The area of Gibson County served by the North Gibson School Corporation

Location of Gibson County within Indiana

The North Gibson School Corporation is the second largest of the three public school governing institutions in Gibson County, Indiana, United States as well as one of the twenty largest in enrollment in Southwestern Indiana. The NGSC is responsible for a district including three townships of northern and northeastern Gibson County; Patoka, Washington, and White River. However, the Gibson-Pike-Warrick Special Education Cooperative sends the majority of the students in special education from Pike and Gibson Counties to Princeton Community High School, the high school of the district.

== Schools ==
- Princeton Community High School
- Princeton Community Middle School
- Princeton Community Intermediate School
- Princeton Community Primary School

== Museum ==
- Lyles Consolidated School

== Other facilities ==
- North Gibson GED Program
- Southern Indiana Career & Technical Center

== Bordering districts ==
- East Gibson School Corporation
- Pike County School Corporation
- South Gibson School Corporation
- South Knox School Corporation
