= Indiana State Road 168 =

State highway in Indiana, United States

State Road 168
- SR 168 highlighted in red

Route information
- Maintained by INDOT
- Length: 17.179 mi (27.647 km)

Major junctions
- West end: SR 65 at Owensville
- US 41 at Fort Branch; I-69 near Mackey
- East end: SR 57 at Mackey

Location
- Country: United States
- State: Indiana
- Counties: Gibson

Highway system
- Indiana State Highway System; Interstate; US; State; Scenic
← SR 167	→ SR 201

State Road 168 is a 17-mile-long (27 km) east–west two-lane highway that exists entirely within Gibson County in the far southwestern portion of the state, spanning Barton, Montgomery, and Union townships.

== Route description ==
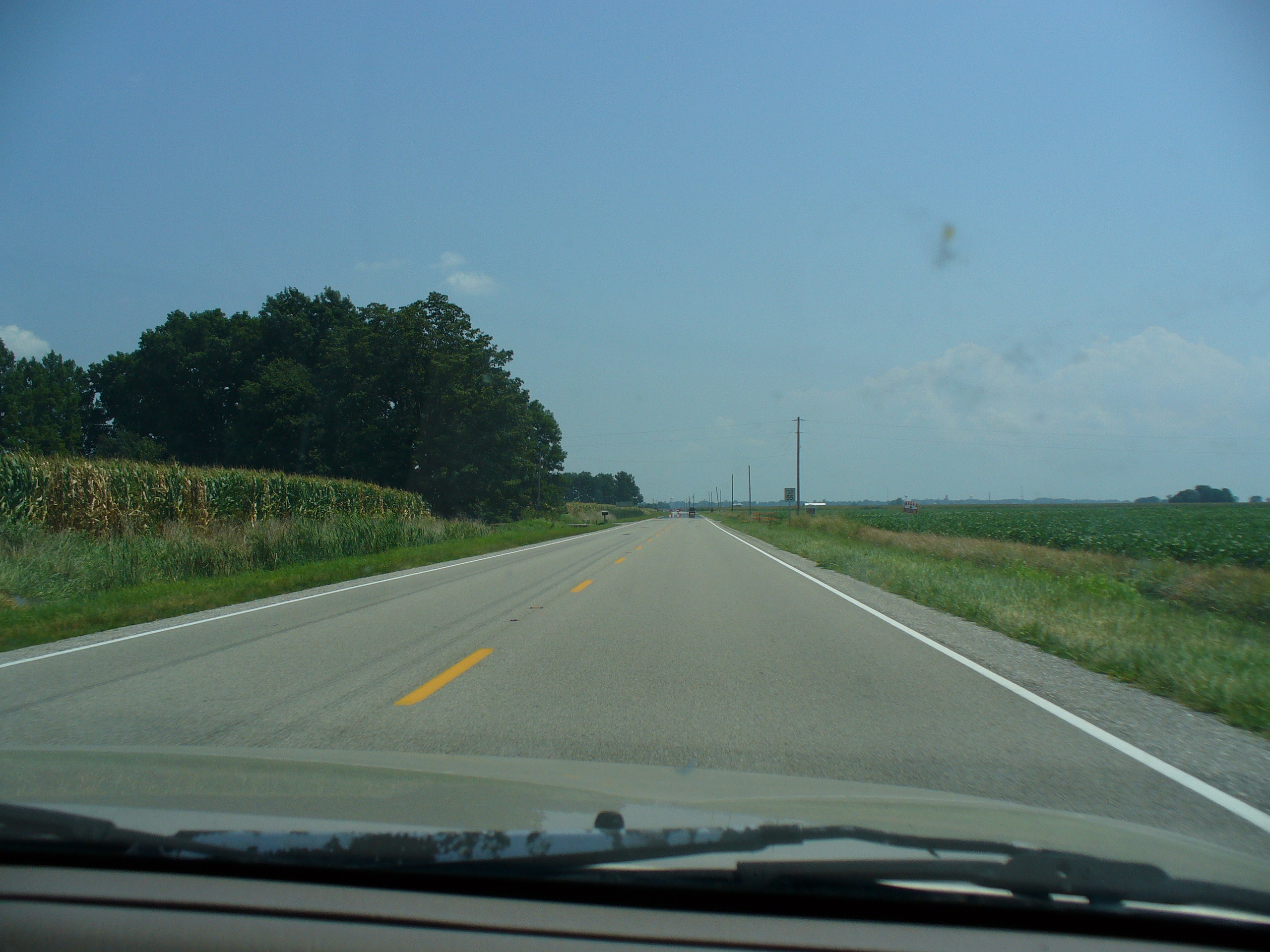
Indiana 168 seen from a Toyota's dash in 2007, near Gibson Southern High School and Owensville, Indiana. Fort Branch, Indiana can be seen in the distance.

State Road 168 runs from State Road 65 in Owensville, through the north side of Fort Branch, to State Road 57 in Mackey. Its route runs about 3 miles (4.8 km) north of, and parallel to, its parent highway, State Road 68.

State Road 168 intersects with U.S. Route 41 and Interstate 69; the latter opened on November 15, 2012.

== Major intersections ==
The entire route is in Gibson County.

Location	mi	km	Destinations	Notes
Owensville	0.000	0.000	SR 65 to SR 165	Western terminus of SR 168
Fort Branch	7.672	12.347	US 41 – Evansville, Vincennes	
Barton Township	14.886– 15.082	23.957– 24.272	I-69 – Evansville, Indianapolis	
Mackey	17.179	27.647	SR 57 – Evansville, Petersburg	Eastern terminus of SR 168
1.000 mi = 1.609 km; 1.000 km = 0.621 mi
