= Mackey, Indiana =

- Town
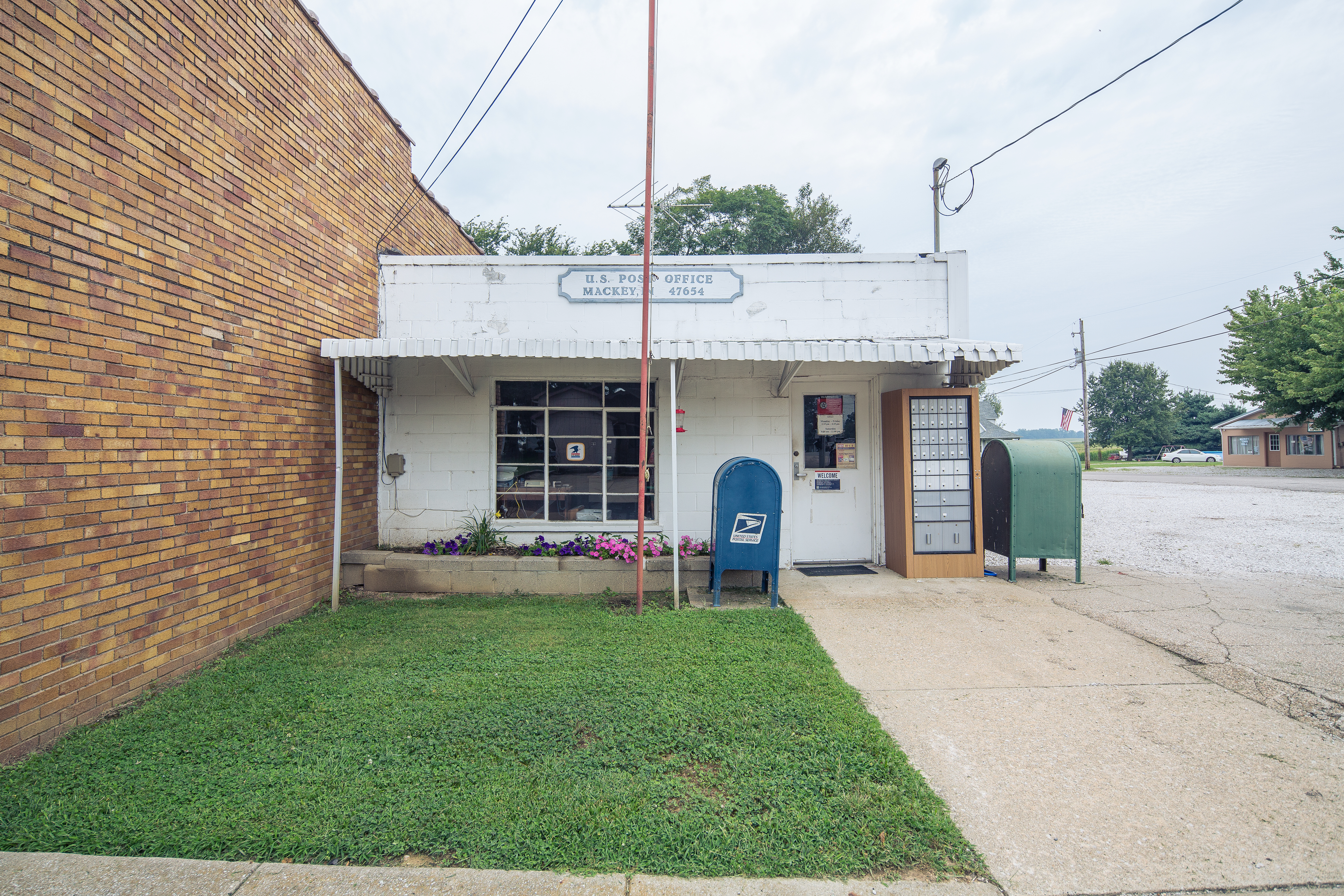

- Location of Mackey in Gibson County, Indiana.
- Coordinates: 38°15′07″N 87°23′28″W
- Country: United States
- State: Indiana
- County: Gibson
- Township: Barton

Area
  - Total: 0.089 sq mi (0.23 km^{2})
  - Land: 0.089 sq mi (0.23 km^{2})
  - Water: 0 sq mi (0.00 km^{2})
- Elevation: 449 ft (137 m)

Population (2020)
  - Total: 131
  - Density: 1,444.5/sq mi (557.74/km^{2})
- Time zone: UTC-6 (Central (CST))
  - Summer (DST): UTC-5 (CDT)
- ZIP code: 47654
- Area code: 812
- FIPS code: 18-45774
- GNIS feature ID: 2396732

Mackey is a town in Barton Township, Gibson County, Indiana, United States. As of the 2020 census, Mackey had a population of 131. It is the smallest incorporated community in Gibson County and one of the smallest incorporated communities in the state.

== History ==
A post office was established at Mackey in 1885. The town was likely named for O. J. Mackey, a railroad official.

== Geography ==
According to the 2010 census, Mackey has a total area of 0.09 square miles (0.23 km^{2}), all land.

== Demographics ==
Historical population
Census	Pop.	Note	%±
1960	98		—
1970	121		23.5%
1980	165		36.4%
1990	89		−46.1%
2000	142		59.6%
2010	106		−25.4%
2020	131		23.6%
U.S. Decennial Census

=== 2010 census ===
As of the census of 2010, there were 106 people, 45 households, and 28 families living in the town. The population density was 1,177.8 inhabitants per square mile (454.8/km^{2}). There were 50 housing units at an average density of 555.6 per square mile (214.5/km^{2}). The racial makeup of the town was 98.1% White and 1.9% from two or more races.

There were 45 households, of which 28.9% had children under the age of 18 living with them, 46.7% were married couples living together, 8.9% had a female householder with no husband present, 6.7% had a male householder with no wife present, and 37.8% were non-families. 31.1% of all households were made up of individuals, and 11.1% had someone living alone who was 65 years of age or older. The average household size was 2.36 and the average family size was 2.86.

The median age in the town was 37.5 years. 19.8% of residents were under the age of 18; 12.2% were between the ages of 18 and 24; 22.6% were from 25 to 44; 31.1% were from 45 to 64; and 14.2% were 65 years of age or older. The gender makeup of the town was 50.9% male and 49.1% female.

=== 2000 census ===
As of the census of 2000, there were 142 people, 60 households, and 40 families living in the town. The population density was 1,721.8 inhabitants per square mile (664.8/km^{2}). There were 61 housing units at an average density of 739.7 per square mile (285.6/km^{2}). The racial makeup of the town was 97.89% White, 2.11% from other races. Hispanic or Latino of any race were 2.11% of the population.

There were 60 households, out of which 30.0% had children under the age of 18 living with them, 58.3% were married couples living together, 8.3% had a female householder with no husband present, and 31.7% were non-families. 28.3% of all households were made up of individuals, and 13.3% had someone living alone who was 65 years of age or older. The average household size was 2.37 and the average family size was 2.95.

In the town, the population was spread out, with 24.6% under the age of 18, 3.5% from 18 to 24, 30.3% from 25 to 44, 19.7% from 45 to 64, and 21.8% who were 65 years of age or older. The median age was 38 years. For every 100 females, there were 79.7 males. For every 100 females age 18 and over, there were 84.5 males.

The median income for a household in the town was $33,750, and the median income for a family was $44,375. Males had a median income of $38,750 versus $21,875 for females. The per capita income for the town was $14,282. There were 6.5% of families and 8.0% of the population living below the poverty line, including 10.0% of under eighteens and none of those over 64.

== Schools ==
Mackey and the easternmost half of Gibson County is served by the East Gibson School Corporation which currently operates five schools:

- Wood Memorial High School (9–12)
- Wood Memorial Junior High School (7–8)
- Oakland City Elementary School (PK–6)
- Francisco Elementary School (K–6)
- Barton Township Elementary School (K–6)

== Former schools ==
In 1968 Mackey High School consolidated with Francisco and Oakland City High Schools to form Waldo J. Wood Memorial Jr/Sr High School located in Oakland City.

== Major highways ==
- Interstate 69
- State Road 57
- State Road 168
