= Indiana State Road 357 =

State highway in Indiana, United States

State Road 357
- SR 357 highlighted in red

Route information
- Maintained by INDOT
- Length: 1.238 mi (1.992 km)

Major junctions
- South end: SR 64 in Oakland City
- North end: SR 57 in Oakland City

Location
- Country: United States
- State: Indiana
- Counties: Gibson

Highway system
- Indiana State Highway System; Interstate; US; State; Scenic
← SR 356	→ SR 358

State Road 357 in the U.S. state of Indiana is a very short north–south state highway in Gibson County, entirely within the city of Oakland City.

== Route description ==
State Road 357 starts at State Road 64, which is also Morton Street, on the south side of town. It runs north for about 200 feet, then veers to the north-northeast and runs parallel with the railroad track about 100 feet to the east. Upon reaching Mill Street, the road veers back to the north and proceeds to its northern terminus at State Road 57 at the north edge of town. It is concurrent with Main Street over its entire length.

== Major intersections ==
The entire route is in Oakland City, Gibson County.

mi	km	Destinations	Notes
0.000	0.000	SR 64	Southern terminus of SR 357
1.238	1.992	SR 57	Northern terminus of SR 357
1.000 mi = 1.609 km; 1.000 km = 0.621 mi
