= Center Township, Gibson County, Indiana =

Center Township Gibson County
- Township
- Coordinates: 38°20′32″N 87°27′17″W
- Country: United States
- State: Indiana
- County: Gibson
- Township Seat: Francisco
- School District: East Gibson School Corporation

Government
  - Type: Indiana township
  - Trustee: Ruth Ann Hurt

Area
  - Total: 37.76 sq mi (97.8 km^{2})
  - Land: 37.62 sq mi (97.4 km^{2})
  - Water: 0.14 sq mi (0.36 km^{2})
- Elevation: 463 ft (141 m)

Population (2020)
  - Total: 1,317
  - Density: 35.01/sq mi (13.52/km^{2})
- Time zone: UTC-6 (CST)
  - Summer (DST): UTC-5 (CDT)
- ZIP code: 47649
- Area code: 812
- FIPS code: 18-11314
- GNIS feature ID: 453177

Center Township is one of ten townships in Gibson County, Indiana. As of the 2020 census, its population was 1,317 (slightly down from 1,341 at 2010) and it contained 566 housing units. Francisco is the township seat.

Historical population
Census	Pop.	Note	%±
1890	1,608		—
1900	1,646		2.4%
1910	1,549		−5.9%
1920	1,687		8.9%
1930	1,733		2.7%
1940	1,607		−7.3%
1950	1,495		−7.0%
1960	1,416		−5.3%
1970	1,473		4.0%
1980	1,563		6.1%
1990	1,503		−3.8%
2000	1,478		−1.7%
2010	1,341		−9.3%
2020	1,317		−1.8%
Source: US Decennial Census

== Geography ==
According to the 2010 census, the township has a total area of 37.76 square miles (97.8 km^{2}), of which 37.62 square miles (97.4 km^{2}) (or 99.63%) is land and 0.14 square miles (0.36 km^{2}) (or 0.37%) is water.

=== Cities and towns ===
- Francisco

=== Adjacent townships ===
Gibson County

- Washington Township (north)
- Columbia Township (east)
- Barton Township (southeast)
- Union Township (southwest)
- Patoka Township (west)

Pike County

- Logan Township (northeast)

=== Cemeteries ===
The township trustee manages three cemeteries: Lawrence, Page, and Meade.

=== Major highways ===
- Indiana State Road 64

== Education ==
Center Township is served by the East Gibson School Corporation.

=== Schools ===
- Francisco Elementary
