= Dongola, Indiana =

Unincorporated community in Indiana, U.S.

Coordinates: 38°22′19″N 87°20′25″W

Dongola is an unincorporated community in Gibson County, Indiana, in the United States. The community is on Indiana State Road 57 two miles north of Oakland City.

== History ==
Dongola was laid out in 1851. It was likely named after Dongola, in Sudan. A post office was established at Dongola in 1851, and remained in operation until it was discontinued in 1862.
