= Barton Township, Gibson County, Indiana =

Barton Township Gibson County
- Township
- Location in Gibson County
- Coordinates: 38°14′47″N 87°23′26″W
- Country: United States
- State: Indiana
- County: Gibson
- Township Seat: Somerville
- School District: East Gibson School Corporation

Government
  - Type: Indiana township
  - Trustee: Wilma Miley

Area
  - Total: 49.38 sq mi (127.9 km^{2})
  - Land: 49.17 sq mi (127.3 km^{2})
  - Water: 0.2 sq mi (0.52 km^{2})
- Elevation: 430 ft (131 m)

Population (2020)
  - Total: 1,487
  - Density: 30.24/sq mi (11.68/km^{2})
- Time zone: UTC-6 (CST)
  - Summer (DST): UTC-5 (CDT)
- ZIP codes: 47646, 47654, 47683
- Area code: 812
- FIPS code: 18-03556
- GNIS feature ID: 453097

Barton Township is one of ten townships in Gibson County, Indiana. As of the 2020 census, its population was 1,487 (down from 1,677 at 2010) and it contained 663 housing units. Somerville is the township seat.

Barton Township was organized in 1843.

Historical population
Census	Pop.	Note	%±
1890	2,007		—
1900	2,151		7.2%
1910	1,866		−13.2%
1920	1,655		−11.3%
1930	1,734		4.8%
1940	1,922		10.8%
1950	1,842		−4.2%
1960	1,718		−6.7%
1970	1,736		1.0%
1980	1,921		10.7%
1990	1,650		−14.1%
2000	1,796		8.8%
2010	1,677		−6.6%
2020	1,487		−11.3%
Source: US Decennial Census

== Geography ==
According to the 2010 census, the township has a total area of 49.38 square miles (127.9 km^{2}), of which 49.17 square miles (127.3 km^{2}) (or 99.57%) is land and 0.2 square miles (0.52 km^{2}) (or 0.41%) is water.

=== Cities and towns ===
- Mackey
- Somerville

=== Unincorporated towns ===
- Buckskin

=== Adjacent townships ===
Gibson County

- Columbia Township (north)
- Johnson Township (southwest)
- Union Township (west)
- Center Township (northwest)

Pike County

- Monroe Township (east)

Warrick County

- Greer Township (south)
- Hart Township (southeast)

=== Cemeteries ===
The township contains seven cemeteries: Albright, Eden, Kilpatrick, Providence, St John's, Somerville and Townsley.

=== Major highways ===
- I-69
- SR 57
- SR 168

== Education ==
Barton Township is part of the East Gibson School Corporation.

=== Schools ===
- Barton Township School - Mackey
