= East Gibson School Corporation =

School district in Indiana

Location
- Oakland City, Indiana Southwestern Indiana; Gibson County United States

District information
- Grades: K-12
- Superintendent: Mr. Jay Wilson

Students and staff
- Students: 1,019
- Athletic conference: Blue Chip Conference; Southwest Seven Football Conference
- District mascot: Trojans

Other information
- Graduation Rate: 84.9%
- 2008 Graduates: 74
- Website: www.egsc.k12.in.us

The East Gibson School Corporation is the smallest of the three public school governing institutions in Gibson County in both land area and student body with just over 1,000 students. The EGSC is responsible for a district including three townships of easternmost Gibson County; Barton, Center, and Columbia. Wood Memorial Primary School & Wood Memorial Intermediate School make up the facilities of the district. Buckskin, Francisco, Mackey, Oakland City, and Somerville are the towns served by the East Gibson School Corporation.

== Facilities ==
- Waldo J. Wood Memorial Jr/Sr High School
- Barton Township Elementary School
- Francisco Elementary School
- Oakland City Elementary School

== Other Facilities ==
- Southern Indiana Career & Technical Center

== Neighboring School Districts ==
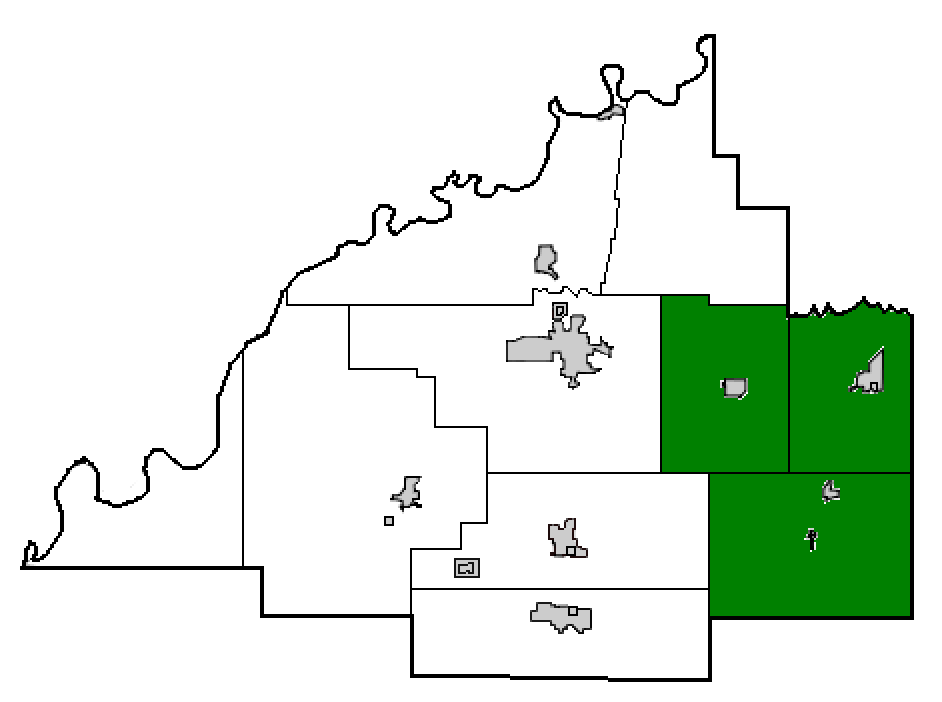
The area of Gibson County served by the East Gibson School Corporation

Location of Gibson County within Indiana

- North Gibson School Corporation
- Pike County School Corporation
- South Gibson School Corporation
- Warrick County School Corporation

== Resources ==
- Southern Indiana Education Center website
- Public School Review - Wood Memorial HS
- School Tree.org - Wood Memorial HS
- Wood Memorial's Indiana Department of Education Profile
- East Gibson School Corporation Website
- East Gibson School Corporation Schools
