= Fort Branch, Indiana =

- Town
- Town of Fort Branch
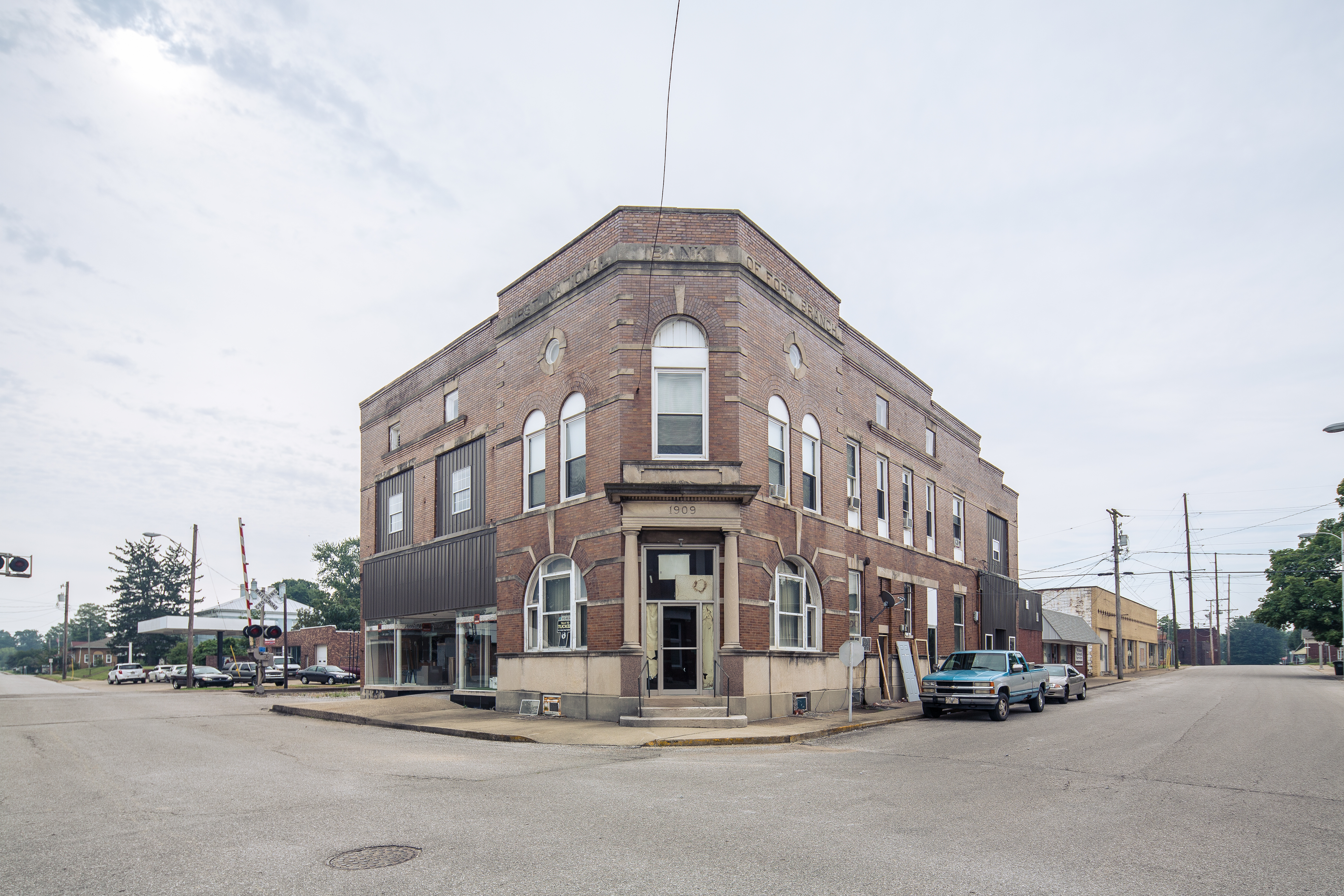

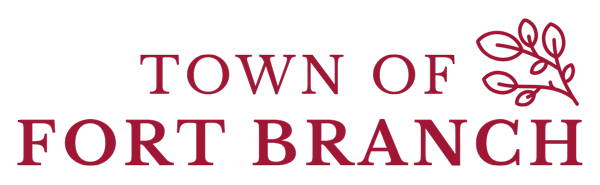
- Logo

- Location of Fort Branch in Gibson County, Indiana.
- Coordinates: 38°14′49″N 87°34′24″W
- Country: United States
- State: Indiana
- County: Gibson
- Township: Union

Area
  - Total: 1.10 sq mi (2.85 km^{2})
  - Land: 1.09 sq mi (2.82 km^{2})
  - Water: 0.012 sq mi (0.03 km^{2})
- Elevation: 456 ft (139 m)

Population (2020)
  - Total: 2,965
  - Density: 2,725.0/sq mi (1,052.14/km^{2})
- Time zone: UTC-6 (CST)
  - Summer (DST): UTC-5 (CDT)
- ZIP code: 47648
- Area codes: 812, 930
- FIPS code: 18-24250
- GNIS feature ID: 2396941
- Website: fortbranch.org

Fort Branch is the largest town and 2nd largest community in Gibson County, Indiana after Princeton. The population was 2,965 at the 2020 census. It is part of the Evansville, Indiana, Metropolitan Area.

== History ==
Fort Branch had its start in the year 1852 by the building of the railroad through that territory. The town was originally called LaGrange, for the original owner of the site, but as there was another post office of that same name in Indiana, the town was renamed in commemoration of an old fort.

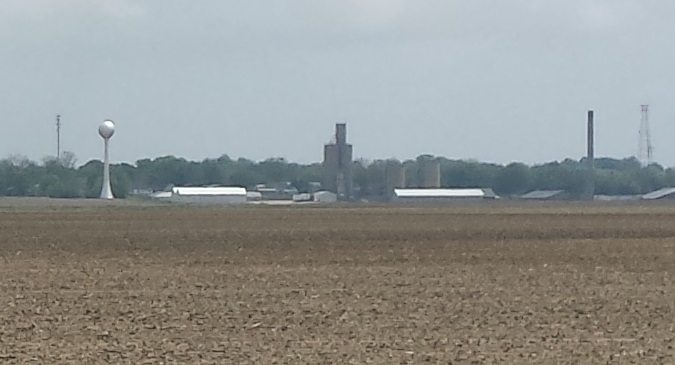
Former Emge Foods Processing plant along the town's west side

On April 3, 1989, an F3 tornado passed through the town causing between 5 and 50 million dollars in damage.

On February 28, 2017, an EF3 wedge tornado, originating in Crossville, Illinois, passed to the north of the town, destroying or heavily damaging several structures along Indiana 168.

== Geography ==
Fort Branch is located at 38°14′49″N 87°34′34″W (38.246872, -87.576003).

According to the 2010 census, Fort Branch has a total area of 1.11 square miles (2.87 km^{2}), of which 1.1 square miles (2.85 km^{2}) (or 99.1%) is land and 0.01 square miles (0.03 km^{2}) (or 0.9%) is water.

== Demographics ==
Historical population
Census	Pop.	Note	%±
1880	778		—
1890	748		−3.9%
1900	849		13.5%
1910	1,182		39.2%
1920	1,389		17.5%
1930	1,341		−3.5%
1940	1,552		15.7%
1950	1,944		25.3%
1960	1,983		2.0%
1970	2,535		27.8%
1980	2,504		−1.2%
1990	2,447		−2.3%
2000	2,320		−5.2%
2010	2,771		19.4%
2020	2,965		7.0%
U.S. Decennial Census

=== 2020 census ===
As of the 2020 census, Fort Branch had a population of 2,965. The median age was 37.2 years. 24.3% of residents were under the age of 18 and 14.3% of residents were 65 years of age or older. For every 100 females there were 100.2 males, and for every 100 females age 18 and over there were 98.6 males age 18 and over.

0.0% of residents lived in urban areas, while 100.0% lived in rural areas.

There were 1,279 households in Fort Branch, of which 31.4% had children under the age of 18 living in them. Of all households, 45.8% were married-couple households, 22.8% were households with a male householder and no spouse or partner present, and 24.6% were households with a female householder and no spouse or partner present. About 33.4% of all households were made up of individuals and 10.9% had someone living alone who was 65 years of age or older.

There were 1,395 housing units, of which 8.3% were vacant. The homeowner vacancy rate was 0.8% and the rental vacancy rate was 13.7%.

Racial composition as of the 2020 census
Race	Number	Percent
White	2,759	93.1%
Black or African American	16	0.5%
American Indian and Alaska Native	6	0.2%
Asian	21	0.7%
Native Hawaiian and Other Pacific Islander	8	0.3%
Some other race	24	0.8%
Two or more races	131	4.4%
Hispanic or Latino (of any race)	58	2.0%

=== 2010 census ===
As of the census of 2010, there were 2,771 people, 1,162 households, and 774 families living in the town. The population density was 2,519.1 inhabitants per square mile (972.6/km^{2}). There were 1,244 housing units at an average density of 1,130.9 per square mile (436.6/km^{2}). The racial makeup of the town was 96.8% White, 0.3% African American, 0.1% Native American, 1.2% Asian, 0.6% from other races, and 0.9% from two or more races. Hispanic or Latino of any race were 0.9% of the population.

There were 1,162 households, of which 31.7% had children under the age of 18 living with them, 51.3% were married couples living together, 10.8% had a female householder with no husband present, 4.6% had a male householder with no wife present, and 33.4% were non-families. 29.3% of all households were made up of individuals, and 10.7% had someone living alone who was 65 years of age or older. The average household size was 2.38 and the average family size was 2.93.

The median age in the town was 38 years. 24.4% of residents were under the age of 18; 8.2% were between the ages of 18 and 24; 26.2% were from 25 to 44; 26.9% were from 45 to 64; and 14.4% were 65 years of age or older. The gender makeup of the town was 49.8% male and 50.2% female.

=== 2000 census ===
As of the census of 2000, there were 2,320 people, 985 households, and 647 families living in the town. The population density was 3,131.0 inhabitants per square mile (1,208.9/km^{2}). There were 1,051 housing units at an average density of 1,418.4 per square mile (547.6/km^{2}). The racial makeup of the town was 98.53% White, 0.26% African American, 0.26% Native American, 0.26% Asian, 0.30% from other races, and 0.39% from two or more races. Hispanic or Latino of any race were 0.69% of the population.

There were 985 households, out of which 31.2% had children under the age of 18 living with them, 54.2% were married couples living together, 8.3% had a female householder with no husband present, and 34.3% were non-families. 30.4% of all households were made up of individuals, and 13.7% had someone living alone who was 65 years of age or older. The average household size was 2.35 and the average family size was 2.95.

In the town, the population was spread out, with 24.5% under the age of 18, 8.3% from 18 to 24, 30.5% from 25 to 44, 20.3% from 45 to 64, and 16.4% who were 65 years of age or older. The median age was 37 years. For every 100 females, there were 92.4 males. For every 100 females age 18 and over, there were 92.1 males.

The median income for a household in the town was $35,964, and the median income for a family was $46,397. Males had a median income of $34,125 versus $21,314 for females. The per capita income for the town was $17,180. About 1.6% of families and 4.4% of the population were below the poverty line, including 3.1% of those under age 18 and 3.2% of those age 65 or over.

== Education ==
South Gibson School Corporation

K-8: Fort Branch Community School

9-12: Gibson Southern High School

College: Vincennes University Center for Advanced Manufacturing

=== Former Schools ===
Fort Branch High School (merged into Gibson Southern High School in 1974)

Marlette School

=== Public library ===
Fort Branch has a public library, a branch of the Fort Branch-Johnson Township Public Library system.

== Economy ==
Like Princeton, Fort Branch is also largely a blue-collar town although of somewhat smaller size. For a long time the town's largest employer was the Emge Foods processing and packing plant, still located along the southwest portion of the town. When the plant closed in May 1999, it had been in operation for nearly 90 years.

As the Emge plant was starting to close, Toyota announced that it would be building a manufacturing facility on a patch of farmland located halfway between Fort Branch and nearby Princeton. While most of the suppliers for the new Toyota plant are located closer to Princeton, most of the population gains from employees moving closer to work moved into either Fort Branch, or into Haubstadt or Owensville.

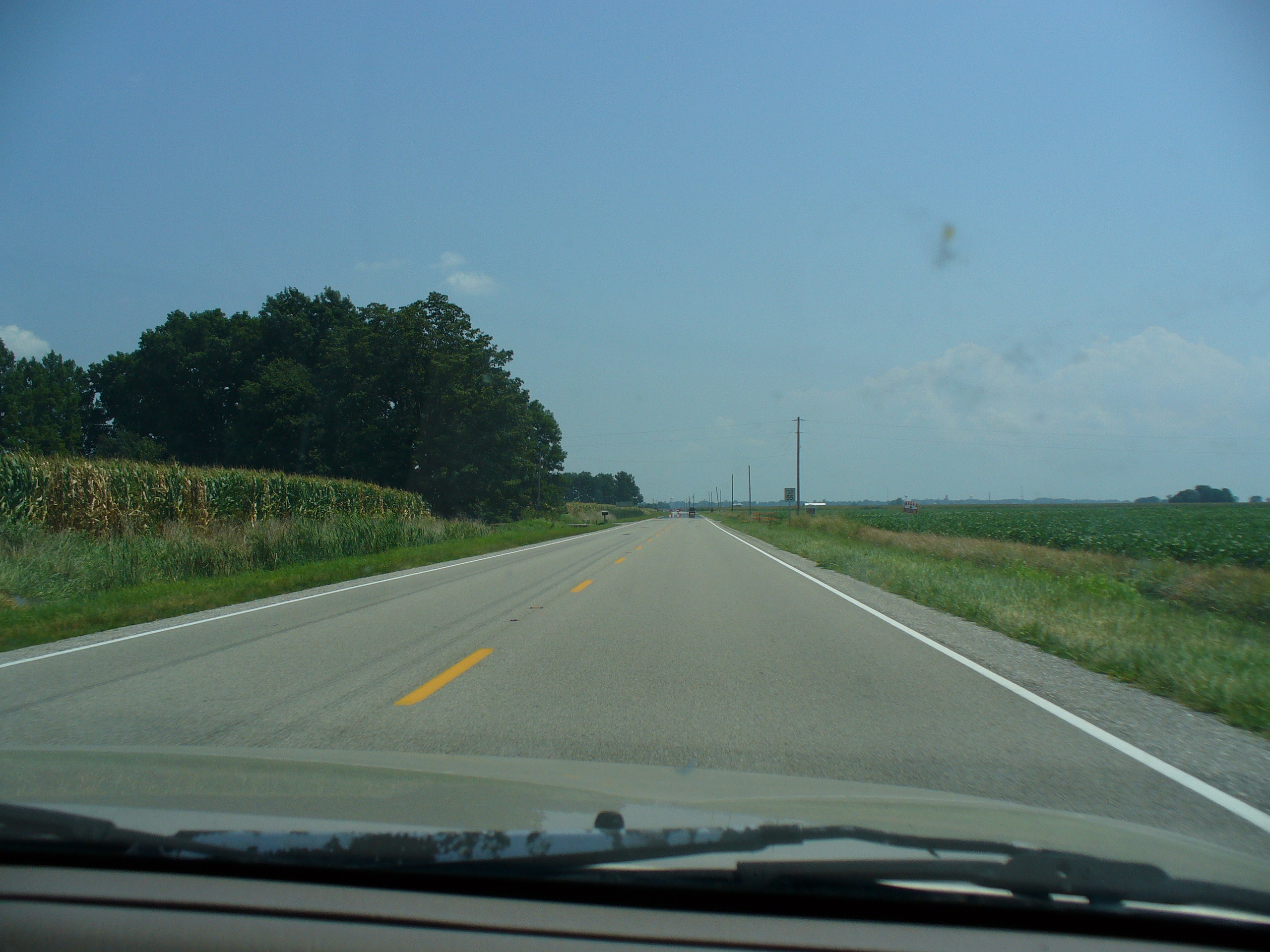
Indiana 168 between Owensville and Fort Branch. The Emge plant is visible in the distance as it looked in 2007.

Recently, Vincennes University announced plans to build an advanced manufacturing education facility just south of Fort Branch along U.S. 41 to provide such education to an area becoming more diverse in manufacturing methods. This is expected to provide a major boost to lifestyle in the Fort Branch-Haubstadt Area. Ground Broke on the new facility on October 23, 2009. The facility opened in August 2011.

On June 18, 2010, a fire started at the former Emge Foods plant. By June 22, the fire had destroyed the vacant meat processing plant portion of the complex but was put out. Fire departments from three counties battled to control the fire, dealing with the unstable structure of the 100+-year-old building and the 95+-degree temperatures that occurred during the five-day period the fire burned. As of February 2014, only the smokestack remains of the plant, with the remains being demolished along with the original water tower between September 2013 and January 2014. As of December 2014, there are no known plans for the future of the property.

== Notable person ==
Sheriff Thomas Beloat, noted for his bravery in stopping a lynching in Gibson County, mentioned in an essay by Mark Twain, The United States of Lyncherdom.

== Panorama ==
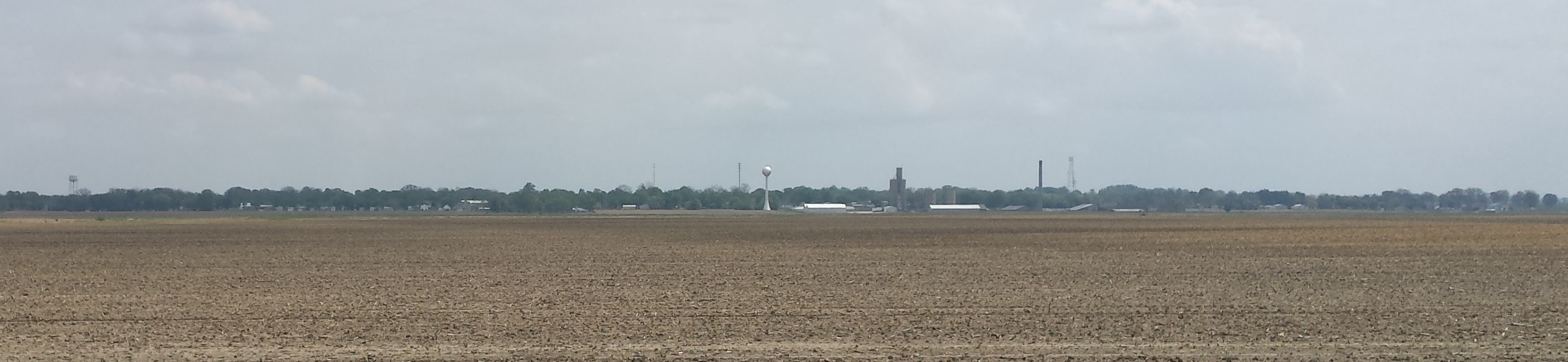
Panorama of Fort Branch from County Road 225W.

== Highways ==
- U.S. Route 41
- State Road 168 (Park Street)
