= Oakland City, Indiana =

- City
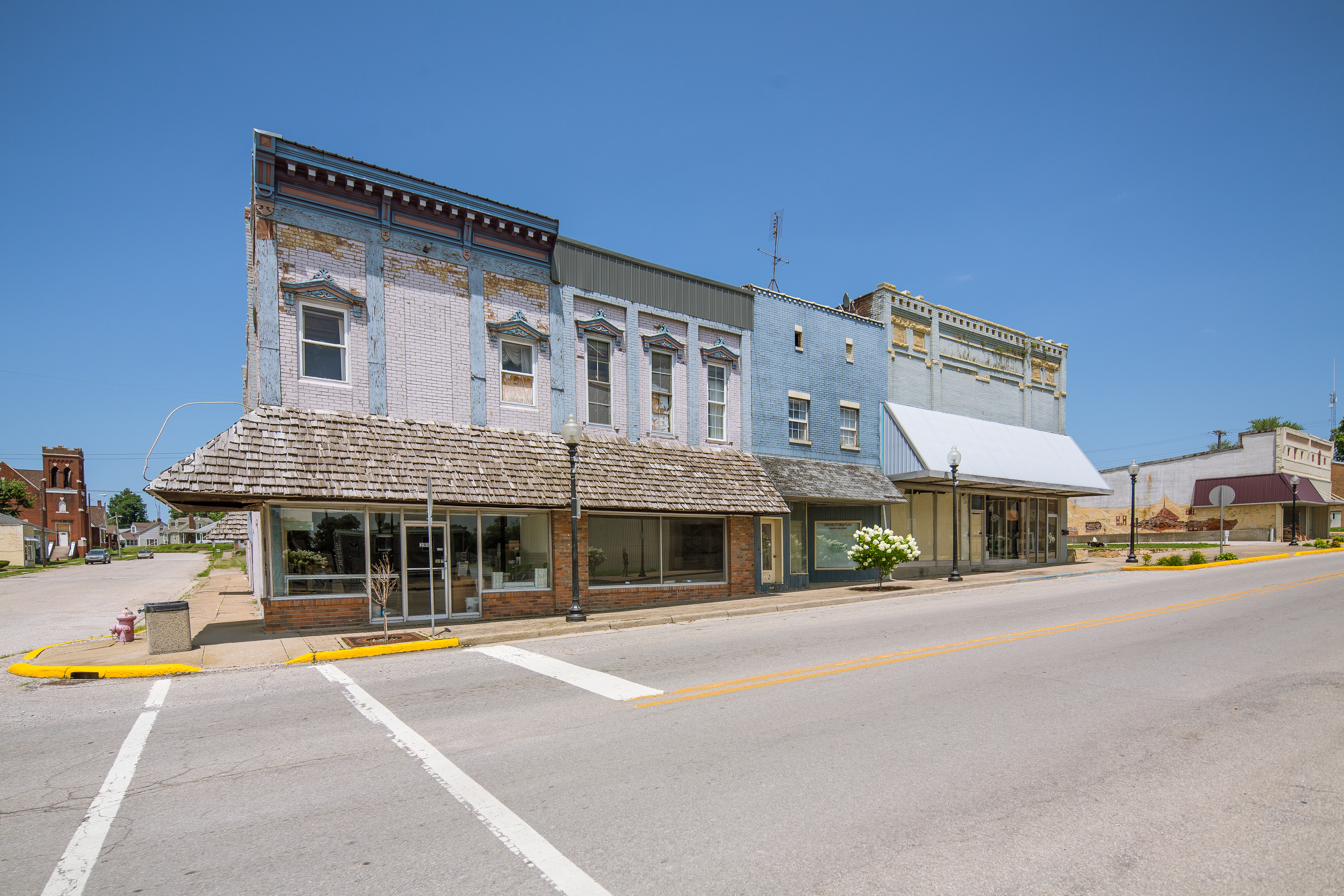
- Main Street (Indiana 357) at the town center.

- Location of Oakland City in Gibson County, Indiana.
- Coordinates: 38°20′16″N 87°20′58″W
- Country: United States
- State: Indiana
- County: Gibson
- Township: Columbia

Government
  - Mayor: James (Jimmy) Deffendall

Area
  - Total: 1.02 sq mi (2.64 km^{2})
  - Land: 1.02 sq mi (2.64 km^{2})
  - Water: 0 sq mi (0.00 km^{2})
- Elevation: 472 ft (144 m)

Population (2020)
  - Total: 2,279
  - Density: 2,232.4/sq mi (861.94/km^{2})
- Time zone: UTC-6 (CST)
  - Summer (DST): UTC-5 (CDT)
- ZIP code: 47660
- Area codes: 812, 930
- FIPS code: 18-55710
- GNIS feature ID: 2395292
- Website: www.ocindiana.com

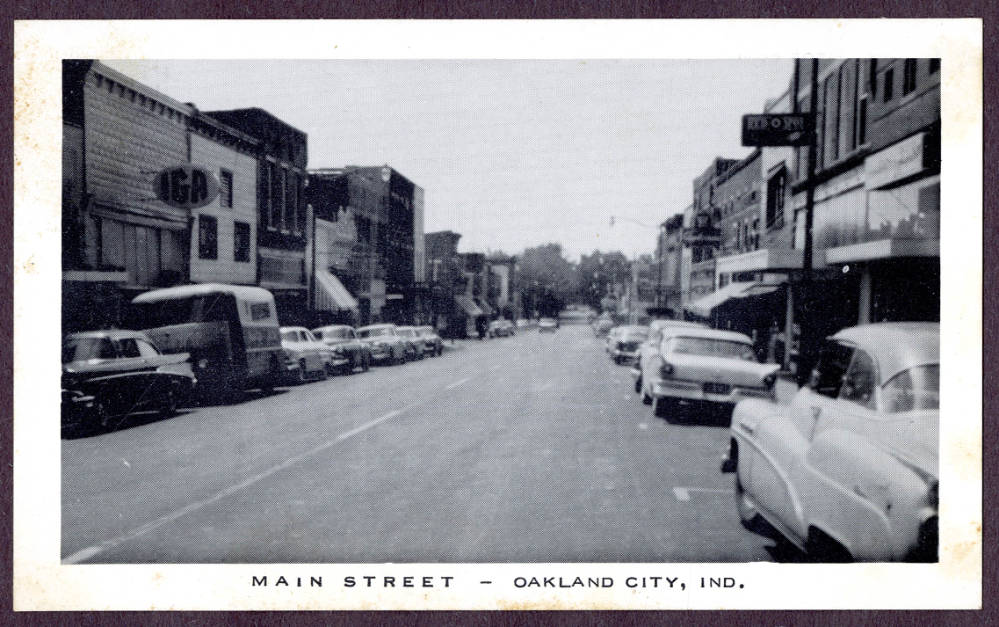
Oakland City postcard circa 1950

Oakland City is the second-largest city, but third largest community in Gibson County, Indiana, United States, after Princeton and the town of Fort Branch. It is the site of the main campus of Oakland City University. The population was 2,279 at the 2020 census.

== History ==
Oakland City was laid out and platted in 1856. It was probably named for the presence of oak trees. The Oakland City post office was established in 1860.

The William M. Cockrum House was listed on the National Register of Historic Places in 1978.

== Geography ==
According to the 2010 census, Oakland City has a total area of 1.132 square miles (2.93 km^{2}), of which 1.13 square miles (2.93 km^{2}) (or 99.82%) is land and 0.002 square miles (0.01 km^{2}) (or 0.18%) is water.

== Demographics ==
Historical population
Census	Pop.	Note	%±
1880	731		—
1890	1,524		108.5%
1900	1,991		30.6%
1910	2,370		19.0%
1920	2,270		−4.2%
1930	2,842		25.2%
1940	3,068		8.0%
1950	3,539		15.4%
1960	3,016		−14.8%
1970	3,289		9.1%
1980	3,301		0.4%
1990	2,810		−14.9%
2000	2,588		−7.9%
2010	2,429		−6.1%
2020	2,279		−6.2%
U.S. Decennial Census

=== 2020 census ===
As of the 2020 census, Oakland City had a population of 2,279. The median age was 34.9 years. 21.6% of residents were under the age of 18 and 17.9% of residents were 65 years of age or older. For every 100 females there were 95.0 males, and for every 100 females age 18 and over there were 90.3 males age 18 and over.

0.0% of residents lived in urban areas, while 100.0% lived in rural areas.

There were 848 households in Oakland City, of which 29.6% had children under the age of 18 living in them. Of all households, 37.9% were married-couple households, 21.8% were households with a male householder and no spouse or partner present, and 30.4% were households with a female householder and no spouse or partner present. About 33.1% of all households were made up of individuals and 15.7% had someone living alone who was 65 years of age or older.

There were 1,003 housing units, of which 15.5% were vacant. The homeowner vacancy rate was 4.6% and the rental vacancy rate was 7.8%.

Racial composition as of the 2020 census
Race	Number	Percent
White	2,071	90.9%
Black or African American	49	2.2%
American Indian and Alaska Native	8	0.4%
Asian	7	0.3%
Native Hawaiian and Other Pacific Islander	1	0.0%
Some other race	53	2.3%
Two or more races	90	3.9%
Hispanic or Latino (of any race)	58	2.5%

=== 2010 census ===
At the 2010 census, there were 2,429 people, 973 households and 568 families living in the city. The population density was 2,149.6 per square mile (830.0/km^{2}). There were 1,157 housing units at an average density of 1,023.9 per square mile (395.3/km^{2}). The racial make-up was 97.2% White, 0.4% African American, 0.2% Native American, 0.6% Asian, 0.5% from other races, and 1.1% from two or more races. Hispanic or Latino of any race were 2.0% of the population.

There were 973 households, of which 28.9% had children under the age of 18 living with them, 39.4% were married couples living together, 12.6% had a female householder with no husband present, 6.4% had a male householder with no wife present, and 41.6% were non-families. 37.0% of all households were made up of individuals, and 17.5% had someone living alone who was 65 years of age or older. The average household size was 2.22 and the average family size was 2.86.

The median age was 36.1 years. 20.6% of residents were under the age of 18, 16.3% were between the ages of 18 and 24, 21.7% were from 25 to 44, 23.8% were from 45 to 64 and 17.5% were 65 years of age or older. The sex make-up of the city was 47.2% male and 52.8% female.

=== 2000 census ===
At the 2000 census, there were 2,588 people, 1,031 households and 642 families living in the city. The population density was 2,352.6 per square mile (908.3/km^{2}). There were 1,176 housing units at an average density of 1,069.0 per square mile (412.7/km^{2}). The racial make-up was 97.60% White, 0.73% African American, 0.19% Native American, 0.50% Asian, 0.43% from other races, and 0.54% from two or more races. Hispanic or Latino of any race were 1.55% of the population.

There were 1,031 households, of which 27.2% had children under the age of 18 living with them, 46.8% were married couples living together, 11.3% had a female householder with no husband present, and 37.7% were non-families. 35.0% of all households were made up of individuals, and 19.0% had someone living alone who was 65 years of age or older. The average household size was 2.23 and the average family size was 2.86.

20.6% of the population were under the age of 18, 16.3% from 18 to 24, 24.1% from 25 to 44, 19.2% from 45 to 64 and 19.8% were 65 years of age or older. The median age was 37 years. For every 100 females, there were 85.1 males. For every 100 females age 18 and over, there were 81.2 males.

The median household income was $28,532 and the median family income was $37,440. Males had a median income of $30,500 and females $24,602. The per capita income was $13,806. About 7.6% of families and 11.9% of the population were below the poverty line, including 14.1% of those under age 18 and 10.4% of those age 65 or over.

== Education ==
=== Higher education ===
Oakland City is the site of Oakland City University, the only General Baptist-affiliated university, with a global campus providing over 40 degrees from associate, bachelor, master and doctorate studies and Oakland City University School of Adult and Extended Learning with programs that specialize in busy adult students. Oakland City University was established in 1885 as Oakland City College. It attained university status and changed its name in the latter part of the 20th century. Oakland City University sports teams are the Mighty Oaks.

=== K-12 education ===
Oakland City is headquarters of the East Gibson School Corporation. Oakland City Elementary School, Waldo J. Wood Memorial Junior High School and Waldo J. Wood Memorial High School are all located on South Franklin Street. The Oakland City Elementary sports teams are the Acorns (relating to the Oaks above). The Waldo J. Wood Memorial Junior High teams and Waldo J. Wood Memorial High School teams are the Trojans. The other school in the East Gibson School Corporation is Barton Township Elementary School, located in Mackey.

=== Public library ===
The town has a lending library, the Oakland City-Columbia Township Public Library.

== Notable people ==
- Gil Hodges, Brooklyn Dodgers first baseman, attended college at Oakland City College
- Edd Roush, Cincinnati Reds outfielder in Baseball Hall of Fame, was born in Oakland City.
- Jeremy Spencer, Five Finger Death Punch drummer, was born in Oakland City.
