= Gibson County, Indiana =

County in Indiana, United States

- County
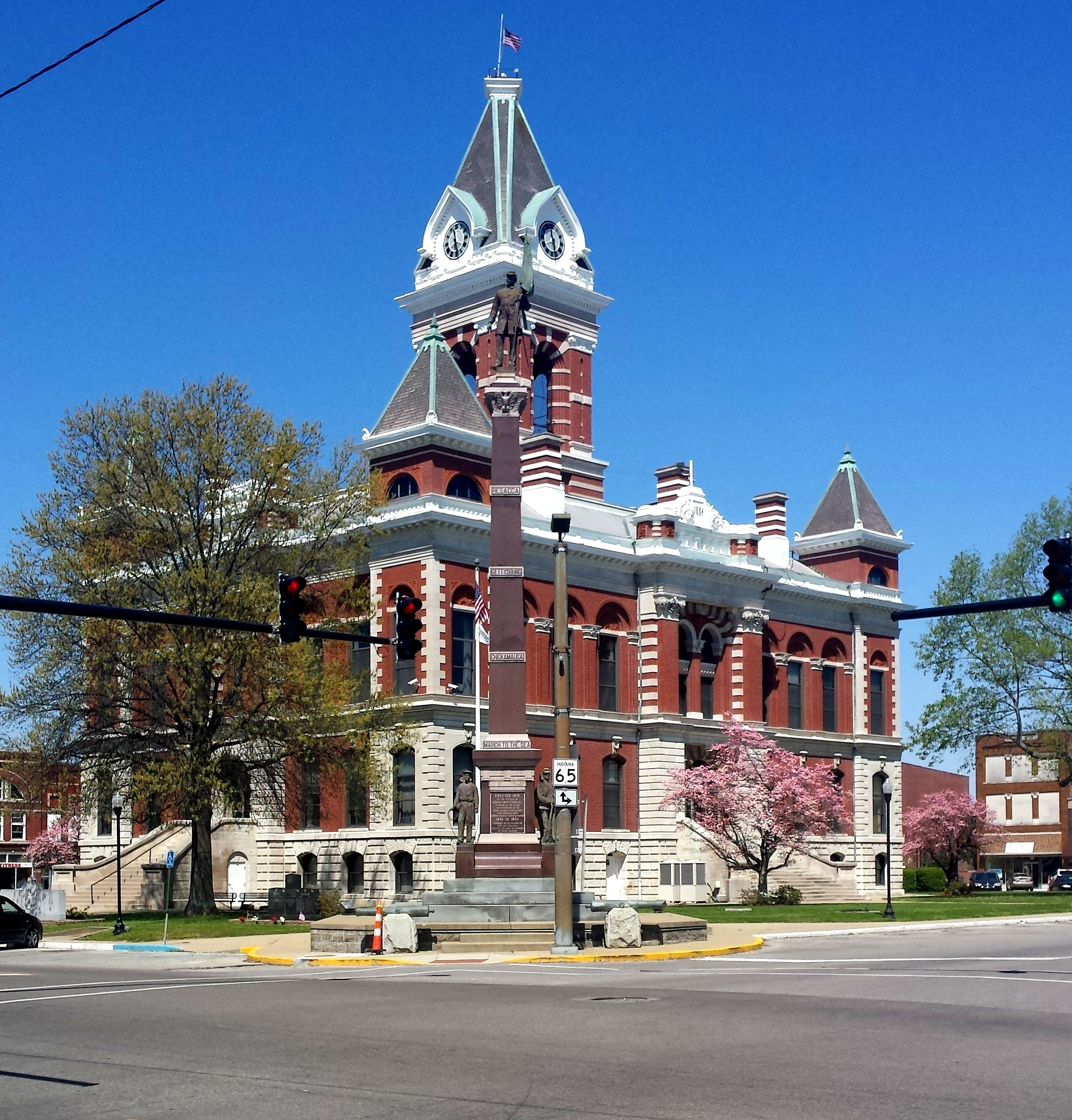
- SE face of the Gibson County Courthouse in Princeton (built 1884) and the Civil War monument (1912)

- Location within the U.S. state of Indiana
- Coordinates: 38°19′N 87°35′W
- Country: United States
- State: Indiana
- Founded: April 1, 1813
- Named for: John Gibson
- Seat: Princeton
- Largest city: Princeton

Area
  - Total: 499.16 sq mi (1,292.8 km^{2})
  - Land: 487.49 sq mi (1,262.6 km^{2})
  - Water: 11.68 sq mi (30.3 km^{2}) 2.34%

Population (2020)
  - Total: 33,011
  - Estimate (2025): 33,091 ▲
  - Density: 67.716/sq mi (26.145/km^{2})
- Time zone: UTC−6 (Central)
  - Summer (DST): UTC−5 (CDT)
- ZIP Codes: 47639, 47640, 47647, 47648, 47649, 47654, 47660, 47665, 47666, 47670, 47683
- Congressional district: 8th
- Website: Gibson County, Indiana
- Indiana county number 26; Seventh largest county in Indiana; Seventh oldest county in Indiana

Gibson County is a county in the southwestern part of the U.S. state of Indiana. As of the 2020 United States census, the population was 33,011. The county seat is Princeton.

== History ==
In 1787, the fledgling United States defined the Northwest Territory, which included the area of present-day Indiana. In 1800, Congress separated Ohio from the Northwest Territory, designating the rest of the land as the Indiana Territory. President Thomas Jefferson chose William Henry Harrison as the territory's first governor, and Vincennes was established as the territorial capital. After the Michigan Territory was separated and the Illinois Territory was formed, Indiana was reduced to its current size and geography. By December 1816 the Indiana Territory was admitted to the Union as a state.

Starting in 1794, Native American titles to Indiana lands were extinguished by usurpation, purchase, or war and treaty. The United States acquired land from the Native Americans in the 1804 Treaty of Vincennes, which included the future Gibson County. Settlers had been pouring into the extreme southwest part of the Indiana Territory starting in 1789, and by 1813 there was sufficient population to form a local governing body. The area included in present-day Gibson County had been first placed under the jurisdiction of Knox County, formed in 1790. Parts of that extremely large county were partitioned off in 1801 to create Clark, in 1808 to create Harrison, in 1810 to create Jefferson and Wayne, and in 1811 to create Franklin counties. On April 1, 1813, the Territorial legislature authorized partitioning a further large section of Knox to create Gibson County. The boundaries of this new county were reduced that same month (April 30, 1813) to create Warrick; in 1814 to create Perry and Posey; in 1816 to create Pike; and finally in 1818 to create Vanderburgh counties.

The first white settler of the future Gibson County was John Severns, a native of Wales who had come with his parents to North America several years before the Revolutionary War. He settled in Gibson County in 1789–90 on the south bank of the Patoka River at a place now known as Severns Bridge. Another early Gibson County settler was William Hargrove, who came from Kentucky by pack mule in 1803; Captain Hargrove commanded a company of militia from Gibson County at the Battle of Tippecanoe in 1811.

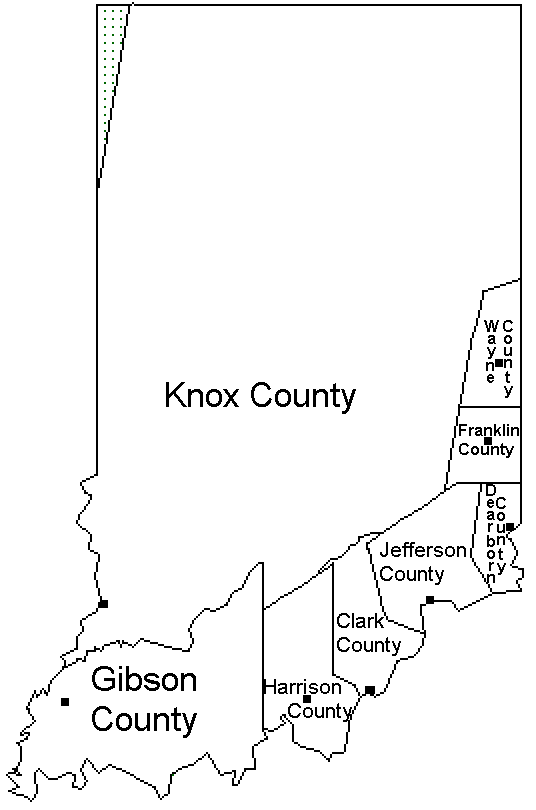
Indiana map of counties, April 1, 1813

The Rev. Joseph Milburn and his son Robert also arrived in 1803. They settled near Princeton, between the Patoka and White Rivers. The Milburns were from the area of Washington County, Kentucky. Rev. Milburn, a Baptist, established the first church; Robert established the first distillery in Indiana.

In 1805, Jacob Warrick arrived, along with his father-in-law, Thomas Montgomery. They burned out the last Native American village in 1807, chasing the inhabitants into the Illinois Territory. Captain Warrick was killed at the Battle of Tippecanoe in 1811.

Gibson County was named for John Gibson, an officer in the French and Indian War and the Revolutionary War. Gibson was Secretary of the Indiana Territory, serving as acting Governor on two occasions. The two counties of Gibson County and Warrick County, separated by Rector's Base Line, were formed March 9, 1813. Gibson County was organized on April 1, 1813, while Warrick County was organized on April 30, meaning that both territories fell under Gibson County for that nearly month-long period. Gibson County occupied everything from the Wabash River and from the White River's extension to the Paoli Base Line down the 2d Principal Meridian to the Rector's Base Line. The area south of this line became Warrick County, which covered the area from the 2d Principal Meridian west to the Wabash River and down the Wabash River and with meanders up the Ohio River back to the 2d Principal Meridian (which had separated Knox County from Harrison County, Indiana Territory). Orange County, Spencer County, Pike County, Dubois County, and Crawford County all came from the roughly 2,000-square-mile (5,200 km^{2}) area occupied by the original Gibson County, as well as small portions of Lawrence County, Perry County, Posey County, the current Warrick County, and Vanderburgh County.

When the county was organized, Patoka was intended to be the county seat. However, Patoka's low-lying location along the Patoka River gave rise to a malaria epidemic; to avoid this, the commissioners chose to establish a new town, eventually known as Princeton, on higher ground approximately 4 miles (6 km) south. However, although Princeton contends it was the only county seat, some contend county records indicate Owensville was a temporary county seat since Princeton was not laid out until late 1814, at least a year after Gibson County's organization.

=== Abolitionists ===
Although Indiana was technically a "free state," those assisting runaway slaves were guilty of breaking the law and could be prosecuted and jailed. Despite the legal threats, the Abolitionist movement was strong in Gibson County where many were active in the Underground Railroad, some openly known as Abolitionists such as David Stormont and his wife who maintained a station at their home three miles northwest of Princeton, along with John Carithers who aided runaway slaves at his home east of Princeton, Sarah Merrick, Princeton, was jailed (after she was unable or unwilling to pay her $500 bail) in Gibson County for helping a runaway slave and her children from nearby Henderson, Kentucky (where slavery was legal), to escape to free territory. Reverend Thomas B. McCormick, a Presbyterian minister, was so well known as an Abolitionist that he fled to Canada after the Kentucky governor requested his extradition. Joseph Hartin of Princeton politically identified himself as an Abolitionist. James Washington Cockrum, originally from North Carolina, maintained a station at his home in Oakland City, first hiding runaways in a root cellar at his log cabin. His son William, who later authored History of the Underground railroad as it was conducted by the Anti-slavery league; including many thrilling encounters between those aiding the slaves to escape and those trying to recapture them, aided him helping the runaway slaves. Their family home in Oakland City, now known as Cockrum Hall, is located on the grounds of present-day Oakland City University and is recognized as a prominent station on the Underground Railroad.

== Geography ==
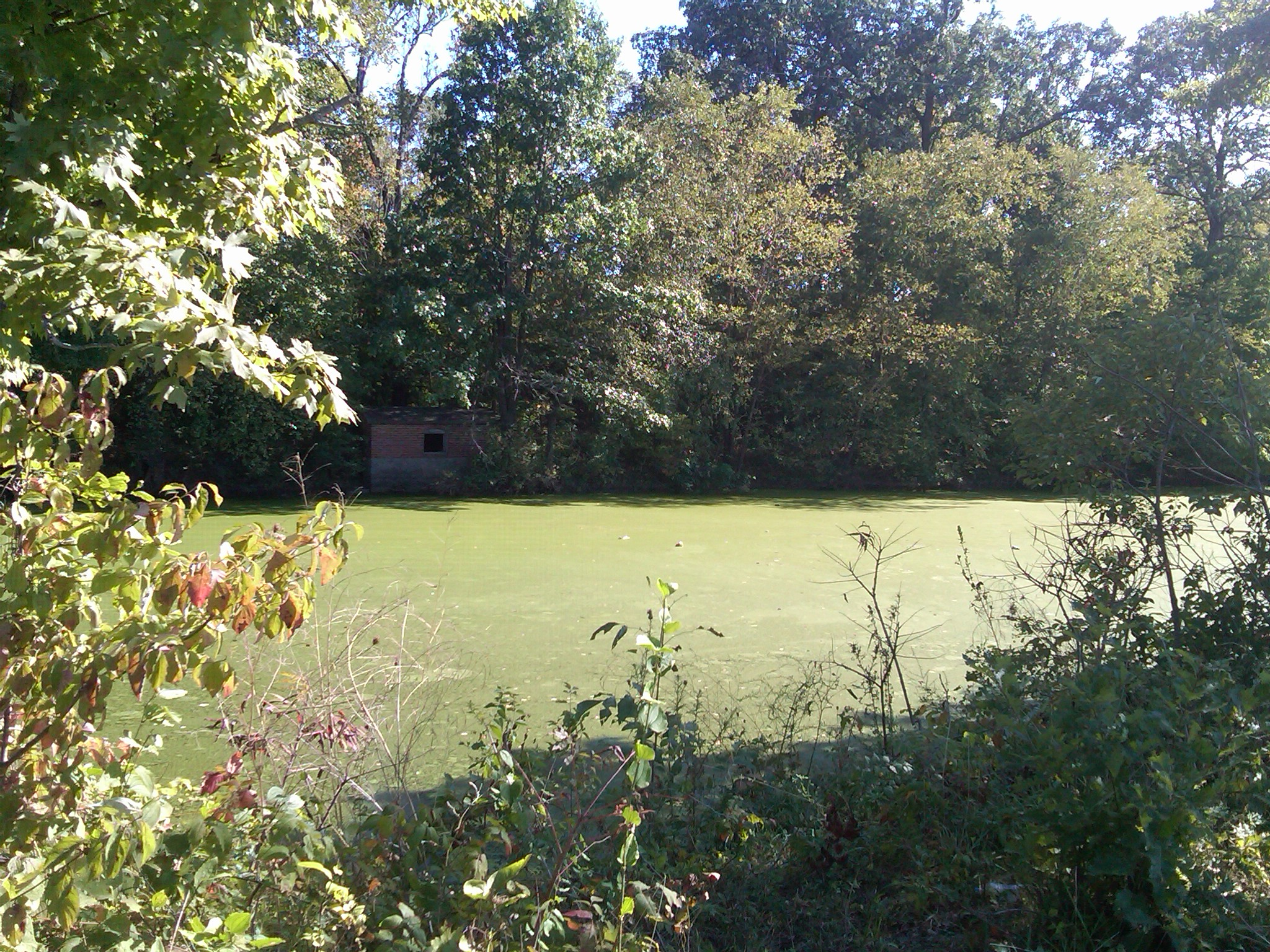
Wabash Erie Canal near Francisco

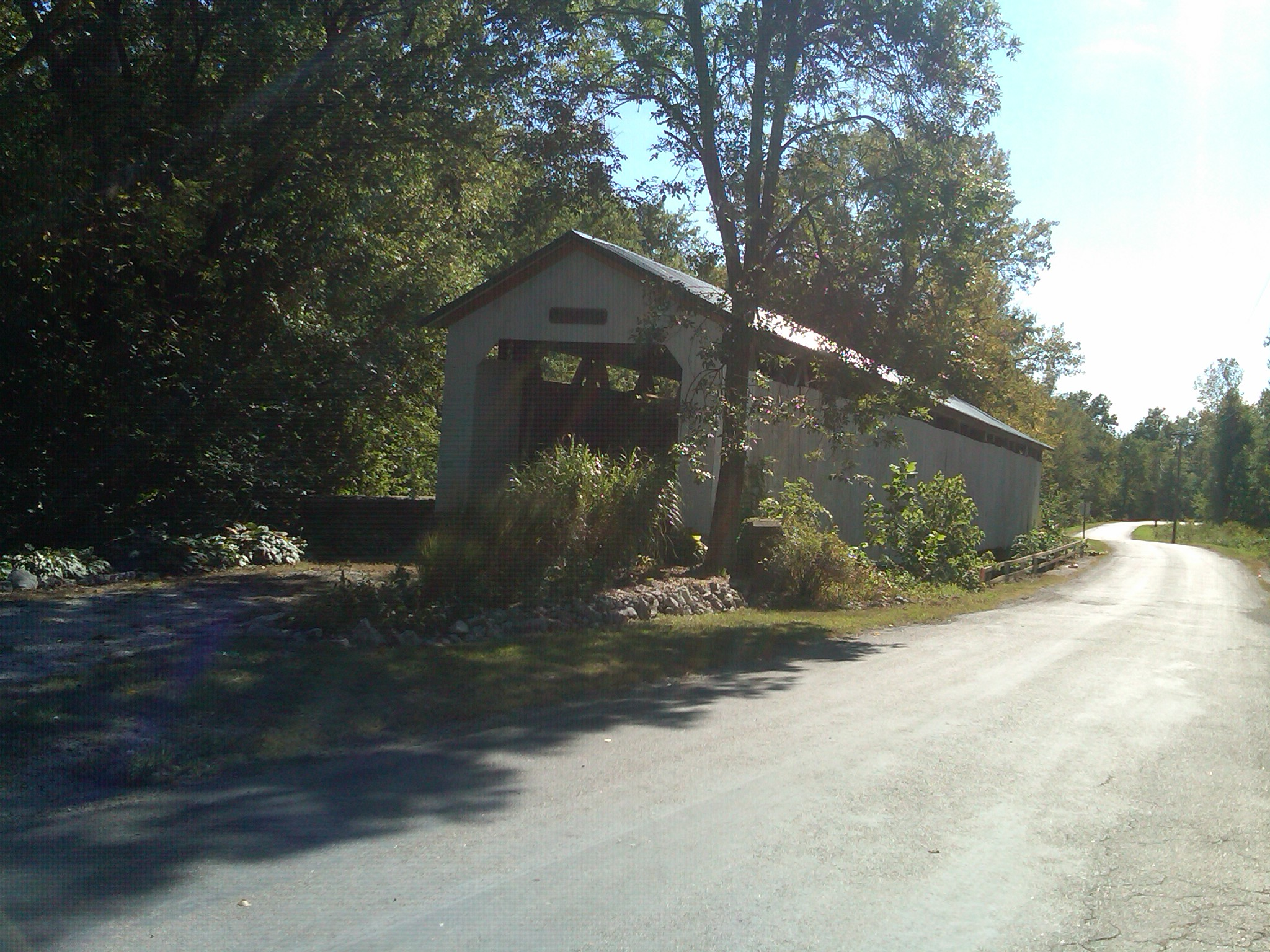
Wheeling Covered Bridge

Nearly 90% of the county exists within the Ohio River Valley American Viticultural Area along with all of neighboring Posey, Vanderburgh and Warrick counties and a portion of Pike County. Despite being close to Evansville and experiencing a large growth of population in the central areas, Gibson County still remains a largely rural county with half of its townships having populations less than 2,000. Less than 7 percent of the county's 500 square miles (1,300 km^{2}) lies within incorporated settlements, or 10 percent if subdivisions are included.

The western part of the county consists largely of spread-out flood-prone farms with spotty marshes along the Wabash and White Rivers. There are rolling hills around Owensville, and large forest and marshland tracts lie near the Gibson Generating Station and the three river settlements of Crawleyville, East Mount Carmel, and Skelton. The northern part is near the White River and is more given to hills and forest. The eastern part contains many hills and is also dotted with strip pits and active coal mines. The southern part is more given to valley and marshland, drained by the Pigeon Creek which flows south through Evansville. The highest point on the terrain (640 feet/200 meters ASL) is a hill two miles (3.2 km) north of Princeton.

Even without Interstate 69, the county is within a day's drive of Chicago, Cincinnati, Chattanooga, Columbus, Indianapolis, Louisville, Memphis, Nashville, Springfield, St. Louis, even South Bend, and Fort Wayne despite the lack of freeway connection. There are two major intersections in the southern extremes of the county: the intersection of Interstate 64 and US 41; and the intersection of Interstates 64 and 69, which will eventually link the county and Evansville to Indianapolis and Memphis and make a day trip to even Detroit possible.

The western half of the Patoka River National Wildlife Refuge and Management Area lies within Gibson County.

According to the 2010 census, the county has a total area of 499.16 square miles (1,292.8 km^{2}), of which 487.49 square miles (1,262.6 km^{2}) (or 97.66%) is land and 11.68 square miles (30.3 km^{2}) (or 2.34%) is water.

=== Adjacent counties ===
  - West • Wabash, IL
  - North • Knox (EST Boundary)
  - East • Pike (EST Boundary)
  - Southeast • Warrick
  - South • Vanderburgh
  - Southwest • Posey and White, IL

=== Cities (with ZIP codes) ===
- Oakland City
  (47660)(3)
- Princeton
  (47670)(1)

=== Towns (with ZIP codes) ===
- Fort Branch
  (47648)(2)
- Francisco
  (47649)(7)
- Haubstadt
  (47639)(4)
- Hazleton
  (47640)(9)
- Mackey
  (47654)(10)
- Owensville
  (47665)(5)
- Patoka
  (47666)(6)
- Somerville
  (47683)(8)

=== Unincorporated communities ===
- Baldwin Heights *
- Buckskin
- Buena Vista (Giro)
- Crawleyville
- Calamity
- Dongola
- East Mount Carmel
- Gray Junction
- Hickory Ridge (Hickory)
- Johnson
- Kings Station (Kings)
- Lyles Station
- Mount Olympus
- Northbrook Hills *
- Oak Hill
- Oatsville
- Port Gibson
- Saint James
- Skelton (now under Gibson Lake)
- Snake Run
- Warrenton
- Wheeling (Kirkville)

* Baldwin Heights and Northbrook Hills are within the city limits of Princeton.

=== Townships ===
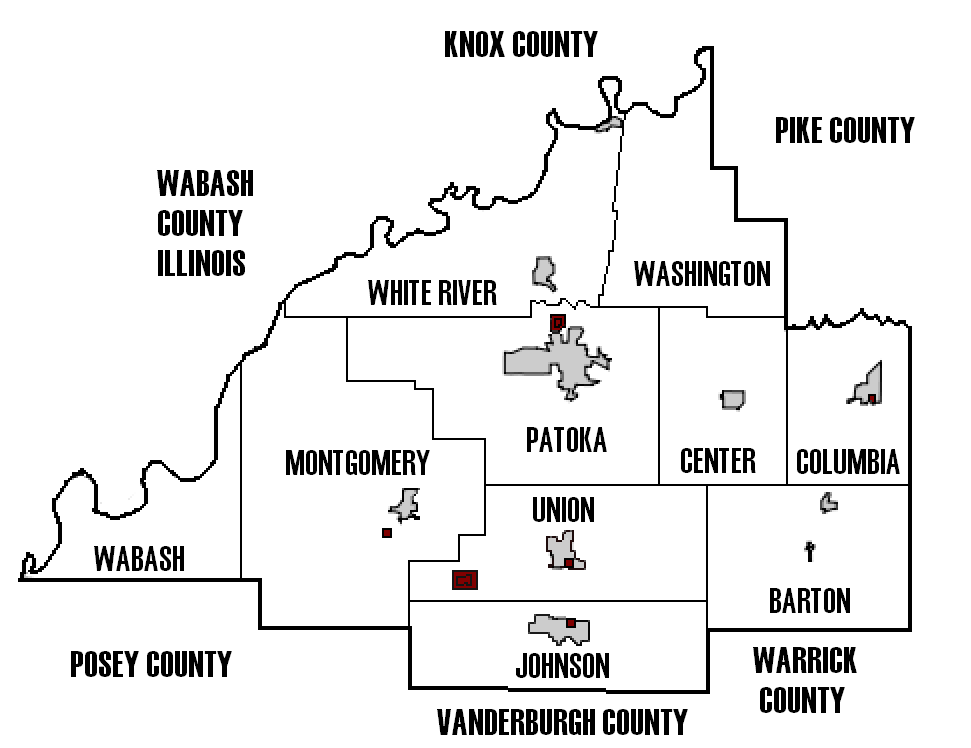
The townships of Gibson County

Gibson County consists of ten townships:

- Barton
- Johnson
- Union
- White River
- Center
- Montgomery
- Wabash
- Columbia
- Patoka
- Washington

=== Climate and weather ===
Princeton, Indiana

Climate chart (precipitation, max. and min. temperature)
J	F	M	A	M	J	J	A	S	O	N	D
2.9 38 21	3 44 26	4.2 55 35	4.5 66 45	5.1 76 55	3.9 84 64	3.9 88 67	4.1 86 65	3.2 79 58	3.2 68 46	4.4 54 36	3.6 42 26
- █ Average max. and min. temperatures in °F
- █ Precipitation totals in inches
- Source: The Weather Channel
Metric conversion
J	F	M	A	M	J	J	A	S	O	N	D
74 3 −6	76 7 −3	107 13 2	113 19 7	130 24 13	100 29 18	100 31 19	104 30 18	81 26 14	82 20 8	113 12 2	91 6 −3
- █ Average max. and min. temperatures in °C
- █ Precipitation totals in mm

In recent years, average temperatures in Princeton have ranged from a low of 21 °F (−6 °C) in January to a high of 88 °F (31 °C) in July, although a record low of −19 °F (−28 °C) was recorded in January 1985 and a record high of 113 °F (45 °C) was recorded in July 1936. Average monthly precipitation ranged from 2.90 inches (74 mm) in January to 5.11 inches (130 mm) in May.

== Demographics ==
Historical population
Census	Pop.	Note	%±
1830	6,192		—
1840	6,280		1.4%
1850	6,403		2.0%
1860	7,855		22.7%
1870	7,939		1.1%
1880	8,282		4.3%
1890	11,156		34.7%
1900	11,227		0.6%
1910	13,661		21.7%
1920	18,061		32.2%
1930	19,666		8.9%
1940	23,926		21.7%
1950	27,777		16.1%
1960	28,567		2.8%
1970	28,799		0.8%
1980	33,156		15.1%
1990	31,913		−3.7%
2000	32,500		1.8%
2010	33,503		3.1%
2020	33,011		−1.5%
2025 (est.)	33,091	▲	0.2%
US Decennial Census; 1790–1960 1900–1990; 1990–2000 2010

=== Racial and ethnic composition ===
Gibson County, Indiana – Racial and ethnic composition Note: the US Census treats Hispanic/Latino as an ethnic category. This table excludes Latinos from the racial categories and assigns them to a separate category. Hispanics/Latinos may be of any race.
Race / Ethnicity (NH = Non-Hispanic)	Pop 1980	Pop 1990	Pop 2000	Pop 2010	Pop 2020	% 1980	% 1990	% 2000	% 2010	% 2020
White alone (NH)	32,310	31,047	31,208	31,752	30,159	97.45%	97.29%	96.02%	94.77%	91.36%
Black or African American alone (NH)	612	588	621	589	637	1.85%	1.84%	1.91%	1.76%	1.93%
Native American or Alaska Native alone (NH)	19	37	57	59	61	0.06%	0.12%	0.18%	0.18%	0.18%
Asian alone (NH)	51	94	167	155	214	0.15%	0.29%	0.51%	0.46%	0.65%
Native Hawaiian or Pacific Islander alone (NH)	x	x	1	2	16	x	x	0.00%	0.01%	0.05%
Other race alone (NH)	22	14	12	31	115	0.07%	0.04%	0.04%	0.09%	0.35%
Mixed race or Multiracial (NH)	x	x	205	474	1,129	x	x	0.63%	1.41%	3.42%
Hispanic or Latino (any race)	142	133	229	441	680	0.43%	0.42%	0.70%	1.32%	2.06%
Total	33,156	31,913	32,500	33,503	33,011	100.00%	100.00%	100.00%	100.00%	100.00%

=== 2020 census ===
As of the 2020 census, the county had a population of 33,011. The median age was 40.6 years. 23.8% of residents were under the age of 18 and 18.4% of residents were 65 years of age or older. For every 100 females there were 99.2 males, and for every 100 females age 18 and over there were 97.6 males age 18 and over.

The racial makeup of the county was 92.0% White, 1.9% Black or African American, 0.2% American Indian and Alaska Native, 0.6% Asian, 0.1% Native Hawaiian and Pacific Islander, 1.0% from some other race, and 4.1% from two or more races. Hispanic or Latino residents of any race comprised 2.1% of the population.

25.3% of residents lived in urban areas, while 74.7% lived in rural areas.

There were 13,271 households in the county, of which 30.7% had children under the age of 18 living in them. Of all households, 51.8% were married-couple households, 18.5% were households with a male householder and no spouse or partner present, and 23.4% were households with a female householder and no spouse or partner present. About 27.7% of all households were made up of individuals and 12.3% had someone living alone who was 65 years of age or older.

There were 14,539 housing units, of which 8.7% were vacant. Among occupied housing units, 76.0% were owner-occupied and 24.0% were renter-occupied. The homeowner vacancy rate was 1.1% and the rental vacancy rate was 8.2%.

=== 2010 census ===
As of the 2010 United States census, there were 33,503 people, 13,255 households, and 9,168 families in the county. The population density was 68.7 inhabitants per square mile (26.5/km^{2}). There were 14,645 housing units at an average density of 30.0 per square mile (11.6/km^{2}). The racial makeup of the county was 95.5% white, 1.8% black or African American, 0.5% Asian, 0.2% American Indian, 0.5% from other races, and 1.6% from two or more races. Those of Hispanic or Latino origin made up 1.3% of the population. In terms of ancestry, 28.3% were German, 24.3% were American, 13.1% were Irish, and 11.7% were English.

Of the 13,255 households, 32.3% had children under the age of 18 living with them, 55.0% were married couples living together, 9.7% had a female householder with no husband present, 30.8% were non-families, and 26.5% of all households were made up of individuals. The average household size was 2.47 and the average family size was 2.98. The median age was 39.9 years.

The median income for a household in the county was $47,697 and the median income for a family was $61,652. Males had a median income of $43,271 versus $28,424 for females. The per capita income for the county was $22,542. About 7.6% of families and 12.2% of the population were below the poverty line, including 16.1% of those under age 18 and 9.8% of those age 65 or over.

== Government and politics ==
Gibson County Sheriff's Department

Jurisdictional structure
- Operations jurisdiction: Gibson, Indiana, United States
- Area: 499 sq mi
- Legal jurisdiction: As per operations jurisdiction
- General nature: Local civilian police

Operational structure
- Agency executive: Bruce Vanoven (R), Sheriff

Facilities
- Stations: 1
- Jails: 1
- Cars: 24

The county government is a constitutional body granted specific powers by the Constitution of Indiana, and by the Indiana Code.

The county council is the fiscal branch of the county government and controls spending and revenue collection in the county. Representatives are elected to four-year terms from county districts. They set salaries, the annual budget, and special spending. The council has limited authority to impose local taxes, including income and property taxes (which are subject to state-level approval), excise taxes, and service taxes.

The Board of Commissioners is the legislative and executive body of the county government. The commissioners are elected county-wide, in staggered four-year terms. One commissioner serves as president. The commissioners execute acts legislated by the council, collect revenue, and manage the county government.

The county maintains two court systems, Circuit Court and Superior Court. Judges are elected to a term of six years and must be a member of the Indiana Bar Association. In some cases, court decisions can be appealed to the state level circuit court.

The county has other elected offices, including Sheriff, Coroner, Auditor, Treasurer, Recorder, Surveyor, Assessor, and Circuit Court Clerk. These officers are elected to four-year terms. Members elected to county government positions are required to declare party affiliations and to be residents of the county.

Gibson County is part of Indiana's 8th congressional district; Indiana Senate districts 48 and 49; and Indiana House of Representatives districts 64, 75 and 76.

United States presidential election results for Gibson County, Indiana
Year	Republican		Democratic		Third party(ies)	
Year	No.	%	No.	%	No.	%
1888	2,953	49.74%	2,721	45.83%	263	4.43%
1892	2,738	45.34%	2,460	40.74%	841	13.93%
1896	3,471	48.38%	3,622	50.48%	82	1.14%
1900	3,648	49.14%	3,509	47.27%	267	3.60%
1904	3,871	51.27%	3,221	42.66%	458	6.07%
1908	3,753	48.44%	3,656	47.19%	338	4.36%
1912	2,266	30.98%	3,250	44.44%	1,798	24.58%
1916	3,576	45.84%	3,765	48.26%	460	5.90%
1920	7,498	51.32%	6,384	43.70%	728	4.98%
1924	7,100	49.62%	6,149	42.98%	1,059	7.40%
1928	8,137	57.07%	5,882	41.25%	240	1.68%
1932	6,237	39.32%	9,162	57.76%	464	2.93%
1936	7,078	42.36%	9,392	56.21%	240	1.44%
1940	8,326	48.34%	8,709	50.57%	188	1.09%
1944	7,895	50.85%	7,462	48.06%	168	1.08%
1948	7,431	47.30%	7,988	50.85%	290	1.85%
1952	9,171	53.99%	7,617	44.84%	198	1.17%
1956	9,256	55.58%	7,318	43.94%	79	0.47%
1960	8,838	53.89%	7,479	45.61%	82	0.50%
1964	5,865	35.64%	10,507	63.84%	86	0.52%
1968	7,645	47.91%	6,777	42.47%	1,535	9.62%
1972	9,115	61.51%	5,633	38.01%	71	0.48%
1976	7,105	45.55%	8,430	54.04%	64	0.41%
1980	7,643	50.32%	6,834	44.99%	712	4.69%
1984	8,618	54.62%	7,082	44.89%	77	0.49%
1988	7,610	51.83%	7,031	47.88%	43	0.29%
1992	5,172	34.95%	6,909	46.68%	2,719	18.37%
1996	5,392	39.86%	6,488	47.96%	1,648	12.18%
2000	7,734	56.16%	5,802	42.13%	236	1.71%
2004	9,133	62.49%	5,378	36.80%	103	0.70%
2008	8,449	55.72%	6,455	42.57%	260	1.71%
2012	9,487	64.45%	4,928	33.48%	306	2.08%
2016	11,081	71.56%	3,721	24.03%	682	4.40%
2020	11,817	73.12%	4,023	24.89%	321	1.99%
2024	11,896	74.81%	3,722	23.41%	283	1.78%

Overall Gibson County has been a Republican stronghold in national politics. In contrast, Democrats tend to be strong on county-level politics. Princeton accounts for the majority of consistent Democratic support within the county, whereas outside of Princeton, particularly South Gibson is where the consistent Republican support is found.

== Recent disasters ==
=== 2004 snowstorm ===
In December 2004, a crippling snowstorm dumped over twice the normal annual snowfall in three days. Accumulations averaged 20 inches in Gibson County, with snow drifts reaching over 4 feet (1.2 m) in spots and some spots of Gibson County receiving as much as 32 inches (0.81 m). Interstate 64 was closed. The Indiana National Guard was dispatched and local farmers were recruited to help stranded motorists.

=== 2005 flood ===
The White River at Hazleton got as high as 31 feet (9.4 m), almost high enough to overtake US 41, while the Wabash River at Mount Carmel, Illinois rose to 33.95 feet (10.35 m). Extreme flooding occurred throughout the county and high school students from many counties assisted the Indiana National Guard in shoring up levees and sandbagging towns. Hazleton was evacuated because its levee was showing signs of fatigue; however, the levees held. By the end of January 2005, the rivers had receded enough to allow people to return to their homes. Over 100 homes were lost in the flood, which was considered the second-worst flood in the area's history (after the Great Flood of 1913).

=== 2008 earthquake ===
With a moment magnitude of 5.2 and a maximum Mercalli intensity of VII, the 2008 Illinois earthquake was one of the largest instrumentally recorded earthquakes in Illinois. It occurred at 4:37:00 a.m. CDT (9:37:00 UTC) on April 18 within the Wabash Valley seismic zone at a depth of 11.6 km. It was centered near West Salem, Illinois and Mount Carmel, Illinois, specifically at 38.45° N, 87.89° W.

=== 2008 flood ===
A major flood occurred in June 2008, caused by intense rainfall upstream. Both the Wabash and White Rivers were severely flooded and nearly all of Gibson County's levees held the flood back, while many levees upstream were failing.

=== 2017 tornado ===
On the evening of February 28, 2017, a powerful EF3 tornado struck areas of southern Illinois and Southwest Indiana. It began near Crossville, Illinois where it caused one death, then continued northeast, crossing the Wabash River into Posey County where it caused mainly tree and relatively minor structure damage, the tornado then continued its track east-northeast into southern Gibson County where the most intense damage occurred between Owensville and Cynthiana. Two people received minor injuries there. The tornado continued, causing damage along the way, with severe damage being concentrated along Indiana 168 and to several facilities along the southern end of the TMMI complex until ending south of Oakland City, after tracking 44 miles.

== Transportation ==
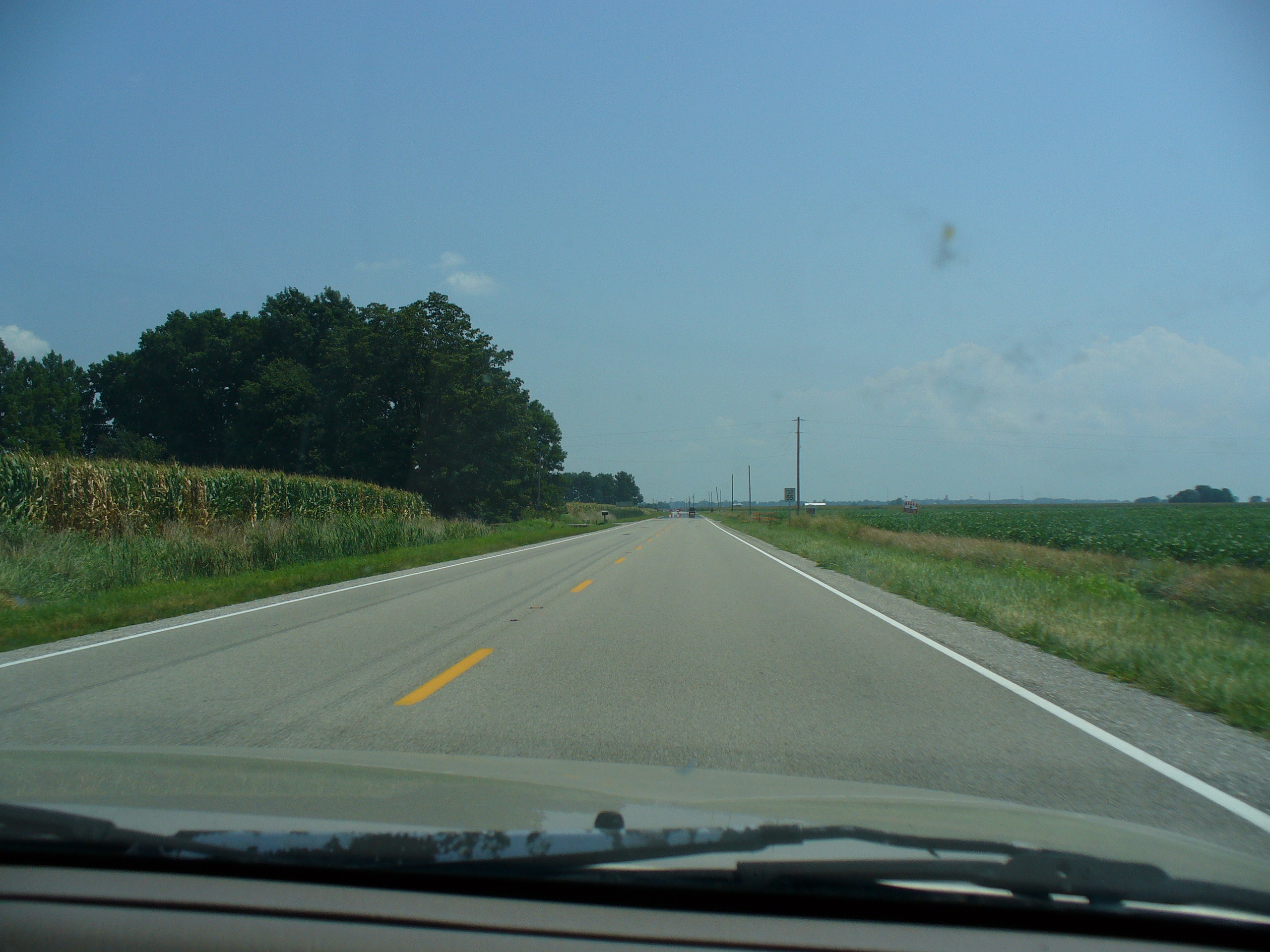
Indiana 168 between Owensville and Fort Branch

=== County roads ===
Gibson County has over 1,700 miles (2,700 km) of county roads, one of the largest amounts of county-maintained roads outside of an urban county. Like most Indiana counties, Gibson County uses the Indiana county road system to identify its roads. U.S. Route 41 (a north–south road) and State Road 64 (an east–west road) are near the meridian and division lines for the county, respectively.

=== Major highways ===
- I-64
- I-69
- US 41
- SR 56
- SR 57
- SR 64
- SR 65
- SR 68
- SR 165
- SR 168
- SR 357

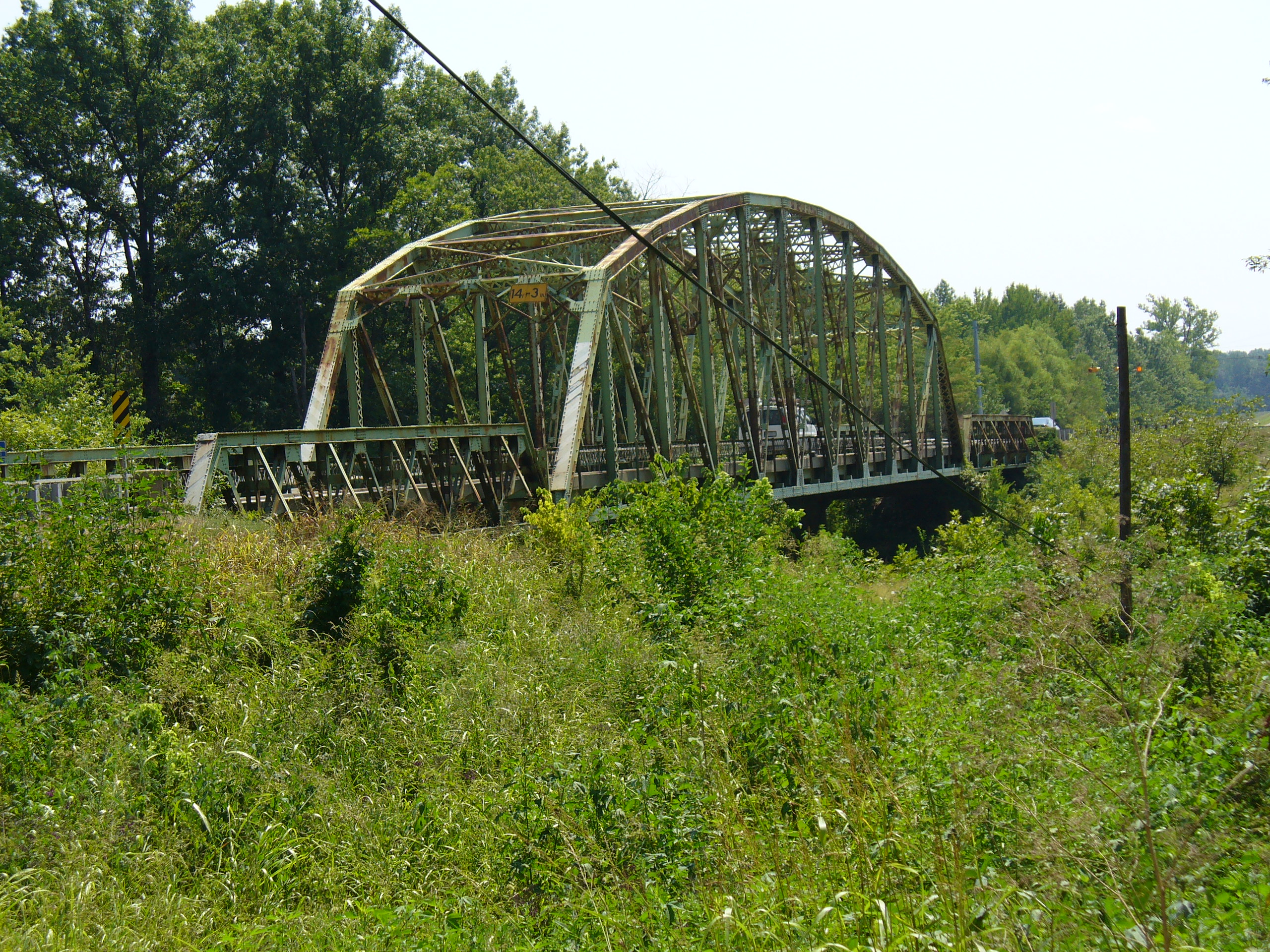
Little Bridge near east Mount Carmel at the western terminus of SR 64. Also known as "The Little Monster" because of the many accidents there, it, like the main bridge, was built to the width standards of the 1930s. It was replaced by a new bridge in 2010. The grassy area in the foreground is now occupied by the new road and bridge.

=== Interstate 69 ===
A section of Interstate 69's construction groundbreaking occurred on July 16, 2008, at the Centre in Evansville. This project has its controversy, highlighted by a group of protesters in attendance. A portion of the first segment opened in September 2009. The entire stretch of highway in Gibson County was open to traffic on November 15, 2012.

=== Railroads ===
Three railroad lines pass through the county. CSX Transportation operates a north–south line, and Norfolk Southern Railway operates an east–west line; they intersect in Princeton. The north–south Indiana Southern Railroad main line intersects the Norfolk Southern line at Oakland City.

== Sports ==
Major League Baseball players and announcers associated with Gibson County include Gary Denbo, Dave Niehaus, and MLB hall of famer Edd Roush. Gil Hodges is the namesake of Gil Hodges Field, a Little League field in Princeton.

Gibson County made its mark on the High School scene with two softball titles by Gibson Southern and a double overtime boys' basketball state title by Princeton in 2009, completing a 29–0 season as well as PCHS now holding the all-time points record with Jackie Young as of 2016 and a 2015 girls' basketball state title. In addition there are three state runner-up titles. All of these titles have been acquired since Gibson Southern's softball runner-up title in 2001.

== Education ==
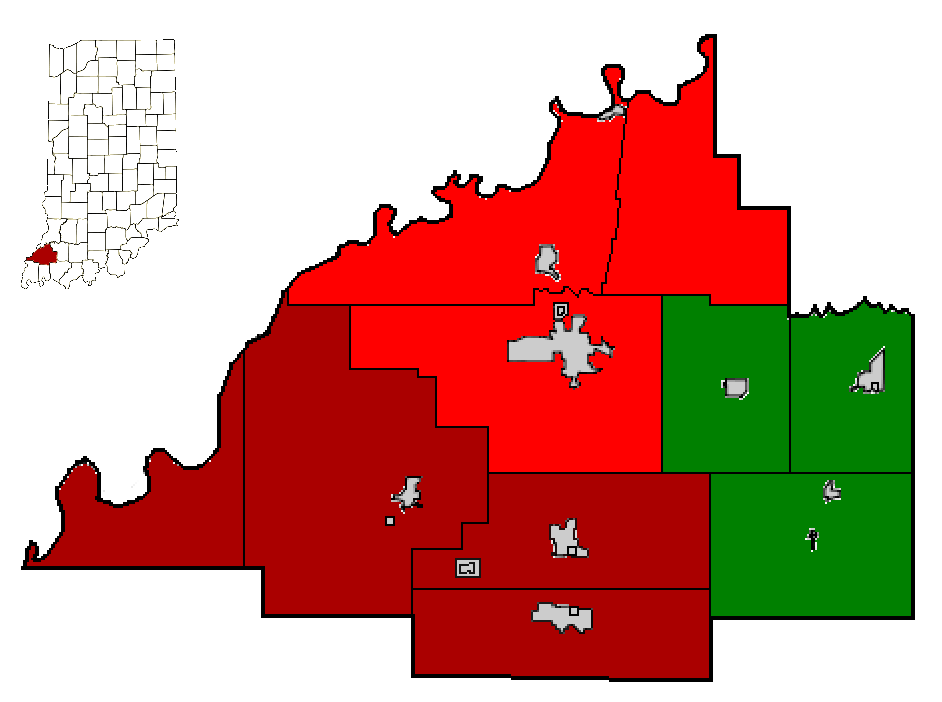
Gibson County's three school districts in their HS primary colors East Gibson in green North Gibson in red South Gibson in Maroon

=== Public school districts ===
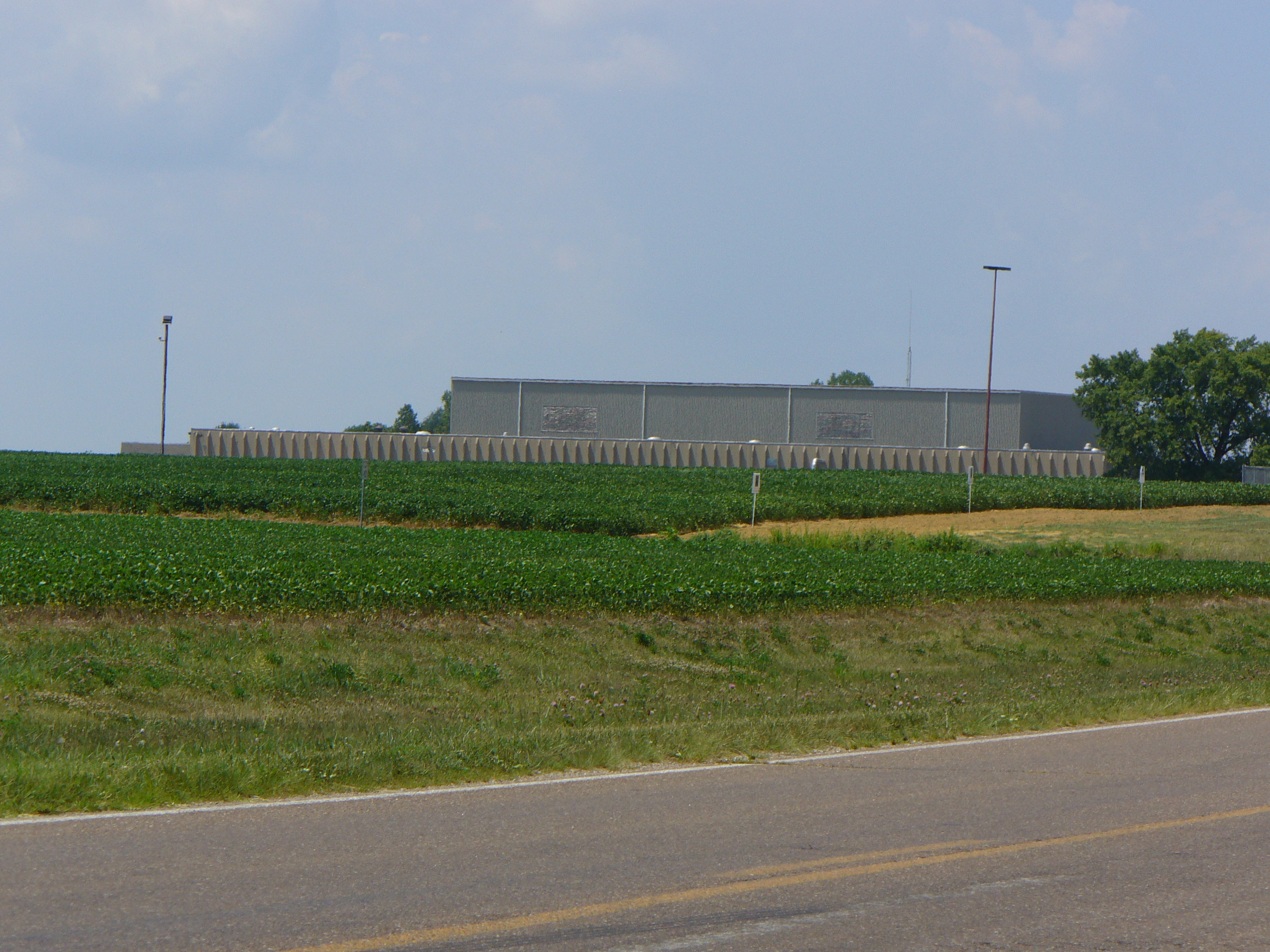
The eastern wall of Gibson Southern High School, near Fort Branch, Indiana as it looked before 2008. Gibson Southern, which services several nearby towns, underwent extensive renovation from 2008 to 2010.

East Gibson School Corporation – Oakland City:

- Waldo J. Wood Memorial Jr/Sr High School – Oakland City (Trojans)
- Oakland City Elementary School – Oakland City (Acorns)
- Barton Township School – Mackey (Aces)

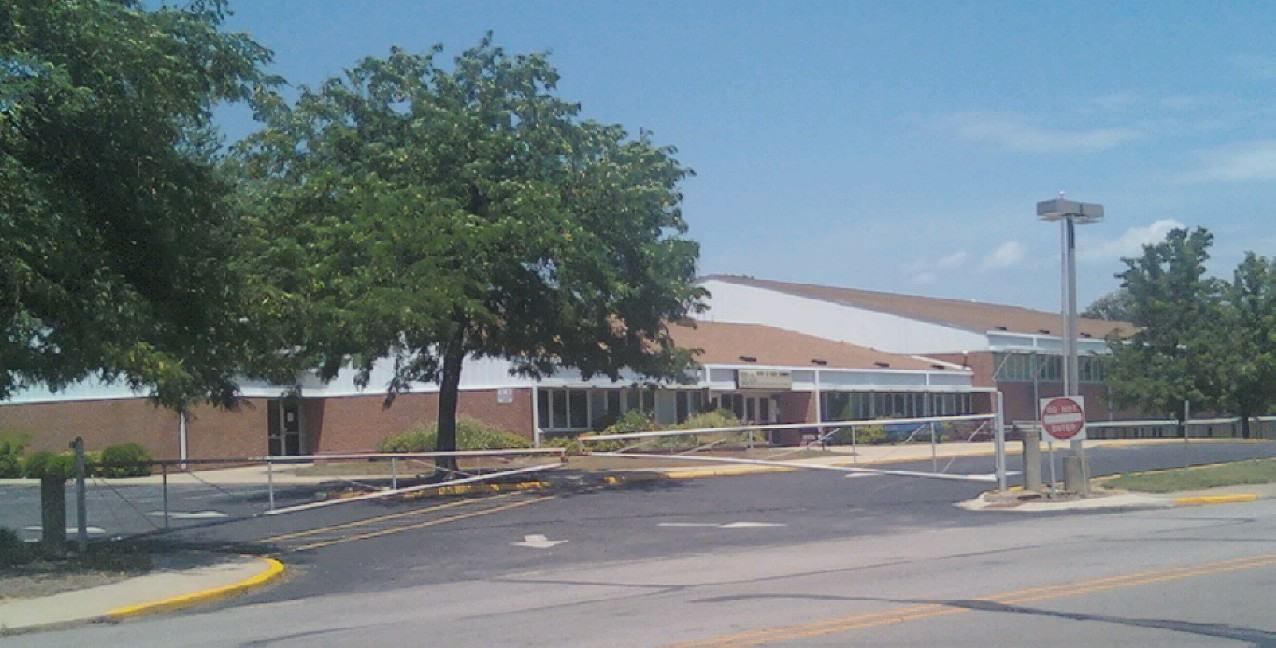
Francisco Elem. School 2010

North Gibson School Corporation – Princeton:

- Princeton Community High School – Princeton (Tigers)
- Princeton Community Middle School – Princeton (Tigers)
- Brumfield Elementary School (formerly the "Early Learning Center") – Princeton (Tiger Cubs)

South Gibson School Corporation – Fort Branch:

- Gibson Southern High School – Fort Branch (Titans)
- Fort Branch Community School (K-8) – Fort Branch (Twigs)
- Haubstadt Community School (K-8) – Haubstadt (Elites)
- Owensville Community School (K-8) – Owensville (Kickapoos)

=== Private education ===
Gibson County's private education facilities consist of four Catholic schools run by the Roman Catholic Diocese of Evansville and one non-Catholic Christian school. Holy Cross, St. James, and Bethel field basketball teams. Enrollment and grades are in the first parentheses. Mascot (I/A) is in 2nd parentheses.

- Bethel Christian School – Princeton (K3-8:112) (Crusaders)
- Holy Cross Catholic School – Fort Branch (K-5:111) (Crusaders)
- St. James Catholic School – St. James/Haubstadt (K-8:185) (Cougars)
- St. Joseph Catholic School – Princeton (K-5:185)
- Sts. Peter & Paul Catholic School – Haubstadt (K-5:200)

=== Higher education ===
- Oakland City University – Oakland City, private university
- Vincennes University Workforce Training Center – Princeton Branch – on southwest corner of Gibson County Courthouse
- Ivy Tech Campus – 2 miles (3.2 km) south of Princeton, soon to be within city limits in upcoming annexation
- Vincennes University Center for Advanced Manufacturing – located near Fort Branch Community School at U.S. 41 and Coal Mine Road (CR 800 South). Groundbreaking was on October 23, 2009, with construction starting on November 3, 2009. Workforce programs offered at the Gibson County Center include certified miner safety training and heavy equipment operator training. In February 2016, in cooperation with North American Crane Certifications (NACC), this facility became an official training and testing site for Crane Institute Certification (CIC).

== Businesses ==
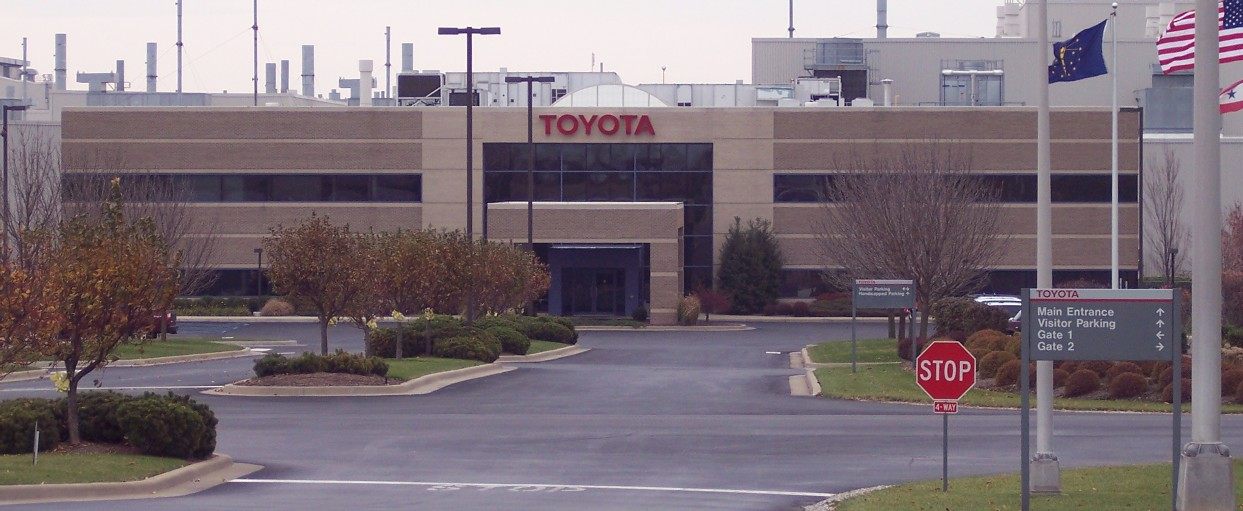
Toyota Motor Manufacturing Indiana is Gibson County's largest employer.

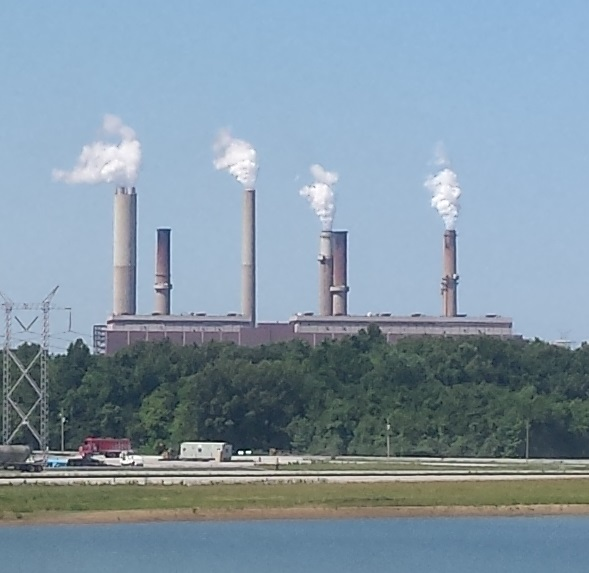
Duke Energy's Gibson Generating Station. Although it is the largest coal power plant in the US, GGS is often still referred to by locals as PSI, in reference to its original and long−time owner, Public Service Indiana.

=== Industry ===
- Gibson Generating Station (coal), Owensville, located across IN-64 from East Mount Carmel and across the Wabash River from Mount Carmel, Illinois, 7 miles (11 km) northwest of Owensville and 10 miles (16 km) west of Princeton)
- Toyota Motor Manufacturing Indiana (TMMI), Princeton, located almost exactly halfway between Princeton and Fort Branch and largely in Union Township but addressed to Princeton. Produces the Toyota Highlander, Toyota Sienna, Toyota Grand Highlander, and the Lexus TX.
- Hansen Corporation, Princeton, located on the south side
- Millennium Steel, Princeton, located Immediately north of Toyota. Visited by President Barack Obama on October 3, 2014.
- Vuteq, Princeton, located at north east corner of Toyota Plant Complex
- Gibson County Quality Assurance, Princeton, located in Gibson County Warehousing Complex, 1 mile (2 km) north of the Toyota plant. Also has a warehouse complex southeast of the Toyota plant.
- Toyota Tsusho, Princeton, located in Gibson County Warehousing complex, 1 mile (2 km) north of Toyota plant
- Toyota Boshoku Indiana (TBIN), formerly TISA (Total Interior Systems of America), Princeton, located at north end of the Industrial Park on Gach Road
- Peabody Energy, Francisco Mine, formerly Black Beauty Coal Company, located north of Francisco.
- Gibson County Coal operates a large mine northwest of Princeton, a service mine 7 miles (11 km) west of Princeton, and a mine north of Owensville
- Norfolk Southern Railway
- CSX Transportation

=== Broadcast media ===
- FM 98.1 WRAY-FM – Princeton – Country Music
- FM 101.5 WBGW-FM – Fort Branch – Religious Music/Talk
- AM 1250 WRAY – Princeton – News/Talk

=== Newspapers ===
- The Princeton Clarion – Princeton
- South Gibson Bulletin – Owensville, Fort Branch, and Haubstadt
- South Gibson Star-Times – Owensville, Fort Branch, and Haubstadt

== Recreation ==
- Gibson County Fairgrounds – Princeton – site of Indiana's oldest county fair, started in 1852
- Azalea Path Arboretum and Botanical Gardens (south of Mt. Olympus on the Gibson/Pike county line)
- Oakland City New Lake – Oakland City
- Lafayette Park – Princeton
- Gil Hodges Field – Princeton
- Camp Carson YMCA Campground – Princeton
- Haubstadt Old School Park and Old Gym – Haubstadt
- Tri-State Speedway – Haubstadt
- Weather Rock Campground – Warrenton
- Montgomery Park – Owensville
- REH Center (Old Owensville Gym) – Owensville
- Gibson Lake – Owensville
- Marlette Park – Fort Branch
- Old Gym – Fort Branch
- City Park of Fort Branch
- Gibson Southern High School Grounds – Fort Branch
- Patoka River National Wildlife Refuge and Management Area – Francisco and Oakland City
- Hemmer Woods State Nature Preserve – southeast of Mackey

== See also ==
- National Register of Historic Places listings in Gibson County, Indiana
- Grand Rapids Hotel
- Grand Rapids Dam
- Thomas S. Hinde
- Charles T. Hinde
