= Waldo J. Wood Memorial High School =

Location
- 943 South Franklin Street; Oakland City, Indiana 47660; United States; 38°19′49″N 87°21′3″W

Information
- Established: 1967
- School district: East Gibson School Corporation
- Principal: James Wilson
- Teaching staff: 22.50 (on an FTE basis)
- Grades: 9–12
- Enrollment: 200 (2023-2024)
- Student to teacher ratio: 8.89
- Colors: Green, gold, white
- Athletics conference: Blue Chip Conference; Southwest Seven Football Conference
- Nickname: Trojans
- Website: www.egsc.k12.in.us/schools/wood_memorial_high_school

The Waldo J. Wood Memorial High School, formerly referred to as Oakland City Wood Memorial High School by the IHSAA, now simply as Wood Memorial High School is a public education institution located in Oakland City, Indiana, USA, serving the East Gibson School Corporation and drawing students from Barton, Center and Columbia Townships in the much more sparsely populated eastern third of Gibson County, Indiana. As such, Wood Memorial is the smallest high school in county, being roughly half the sizes of either Gibson Southern or Princeton Community.

== Athletics ==
The school is in the Indiana High School Athletic Association class A with around 400 students in grades 9–12. The school colors are green, white and gold and the mascots are the Trojans and Lady Trojans. Since 2002, the school has been a member of the Blue Chip Conference, and more recently, the Southwest Seven Football Conference, although previously it was a member of the Pocket Athletic Conference (Two of its predecessor schools, Oakland City High School and Francisco High School were early members of the conference) along with its county rival Gibson Southern (Two of GS's predecessors were also members). Sports offered at Wood Memorial include:

=== Boys ===
- Soccer
- Tennis
- Basketball
- Wrestling
- Track
- Golf
- Baseball

=== Girls ===
- Soccer
- Tennis
- Volleyball
- Basketball
- Swimming
- Track
- Softball
- Cheerleading
- Cross Country

== See also ==
- List of high schools in Indiana
