= The Log Inn =

Family-style restaurant in Johnson Township, Indiana, United States

Coordinates: 38.1735845°N 87.5313699°W

The Log Inn is a family-style restaurant located in Southeastern Johnson Township in Gibson County, Indiana. It was founded around 1825 by Mr. Henry Haub, the namesake of nearby Haubstadt. During its lifetime it has been used as a host to Abraham Lincoln; a stop on the Underground Railroad; a stop on the Dixie Highway, the main road between Chicago and Florida, which eventually became US 41. A dance hall was later built above the tavern and store and the complex would later become known as The Log Inn. The Log Inn is officially recognized as the oldest restaurant in Indiana. In recent years, The Log Inn was featured in Food Network's Best of Viewer's Choice Program.

The Log Inn is located one mile east of U.S. 41 in Warrenton, Indiana, at the intersection of County Road 1250 South and County Road 200 East or 2.5 miles southeast of Haubstadt and less than 1/4 mile north of Interstate 64. or theloginn.net
