= Owensville High School (Indiana) =

Coordinates: 38.269132°N 87.69344°W

Owensville Montgomery Township High School
- Kickapoos
- Owensville, Indiana; United States

Information
- Type: Public High School
- Closed: 1974 Consolidated into Gibson Southern.
- School district: South Gibson
- Grades: K-12
- Enrollment: 226 (1973)
- Color
- Athletics conference: Pocket
- Mascot: The Chief Kick

Owensville High School, sometimes referred to as Owensville Montgomery High School or Owensville Montgomery Township School was a K-12 Public learning facility located in Owensville, Indiana.

== History ==
Owensville High School was one of the three high schools under South Gibson School Corporation that merged into Gibson Southern High School in 1974. Like the current Owensville Community School, the mascot is the Kickapoos and school colors were Black and Gold. Owensville High School was one of the nine founding members of the Pocket Athletic Conference in 1938 and its membership was transferred to Gibson Southern High School along with Fort Branch High School and Haubstadt High School.

Owensville High School had the first high school gymnasium in Indiana with a glass backboard. One of those backboards is now in the Indiana High School Basketball Hall of Fame proudly located in New Castle, Indiana. The school continued to be used as Owensville Community School until the current building was completed in 1992. The School was subsequently demolished.

Owensville High School's gym still exists as the REH Center. The school was located on the southwest corner of Walnut and Mill Streets in Owensville.
