= Gibson County Fairgrounds (Indiana) =

Coordinates: 38.36203°N 87.57670°W

The Gibson County Fairgrounds are located along Embree Street across from Lafayette Park and across an intersection from Princeton Community High School in Princeton, Indiana, the county seat of Gibson County, Indiana.

The fairgrounds are the site of Indiana's oldest continuously running county fair, started in 1852, the same year as the Indiana State Fair.
