= W06BD =

Television station in Princeton, Indiana (1988–2016)

Princeton, Indiana; United States
- Channels: Analog: 6 (VHF)

Programming
- Affiliations: Independent

Ownership
- Owner: North Gibson School Corporation

History
- Founded: September 1, 1988
- Last air date: May 8, 2016; (27 years, 250 days); (license cancellation)

Technical information
- Facility ID: 49243
- Class: TX
- ERP: 0.014 kW
- HAAT: 89 m (292 ft)
- Transmitter coordinates: 38°21′57.59″N 87°34′55.2″W

W06BD (channel 6) was a low-power television station at Princeton Community High School in Princeton, Indiana, United States, broadcasting over the air and on local cable systems. It was owned by the North Gibson School Corporation and run as an educational program at the school.

The station began broadcasting on September 1, 1988, and combined local programming with national programs from The Learning Channel, The Travel Channel, and the Tempo and RFD-TV networks. Local cable systems had been carrying the Princeton Community High School channel even before it began over-the-air broadcasting.

The 200-foot (61 m) tower used to broadcast W06BD collapsed in 2006 after a lawnmower clipped a guy wire.
