= Haubstadt High School =

Coordinates: 38.204492°N 87.578223°W

Haubstadt Johnson Township High School
- Elites
- Haubstadt, Indiana; United States

Information
- Type: Public High School
- Closed: 1974 Consolidated into Gibson Southern.
- School district: South Gibson
- Grades: K-12 (now K-8)
- Enrollment: 170 (1973)
- Color
- Athletics conference: Independent (Although Briefly a member of the Pocket Athletic Conference)
- Mascot: Ol' Man Elite (Pronounced "E-Light"

Haubstadt High School, sometimes referred to as Haubstadt Johnson High School was a K-12 learning facility, located in Haubstadt, Indiana.

== History ==
Haubstadt High School was one of the three high schools under South Gibson School Corporation that merged into Gibson Southern High School in 1974. Like the current Haubstadt Community School, the mascot is the Elites (Ēlītes) and school colors were Blue and White.

Unlike Fort Branch Marlette and Owensville High Schools, Haubstadt High School was independent in athletics, mainly competing with the other schools of Gibson County. When the schools were consolidated in 1974, Haubstadt student athletes had to participate in the Pocket Athletic Conference. Haubstadt High School also had a marching band.

Haubstadt High School Continued to function as Haubstadt Community School until 1993, when the new facility was completed. Haubstadt High School was subsequently demolished. However, Like Owensville High School, Haubstadt High School's old gymnasium also still exists.
