= Haubstadt, Indiana =

- Town
- Town of Haubstadt
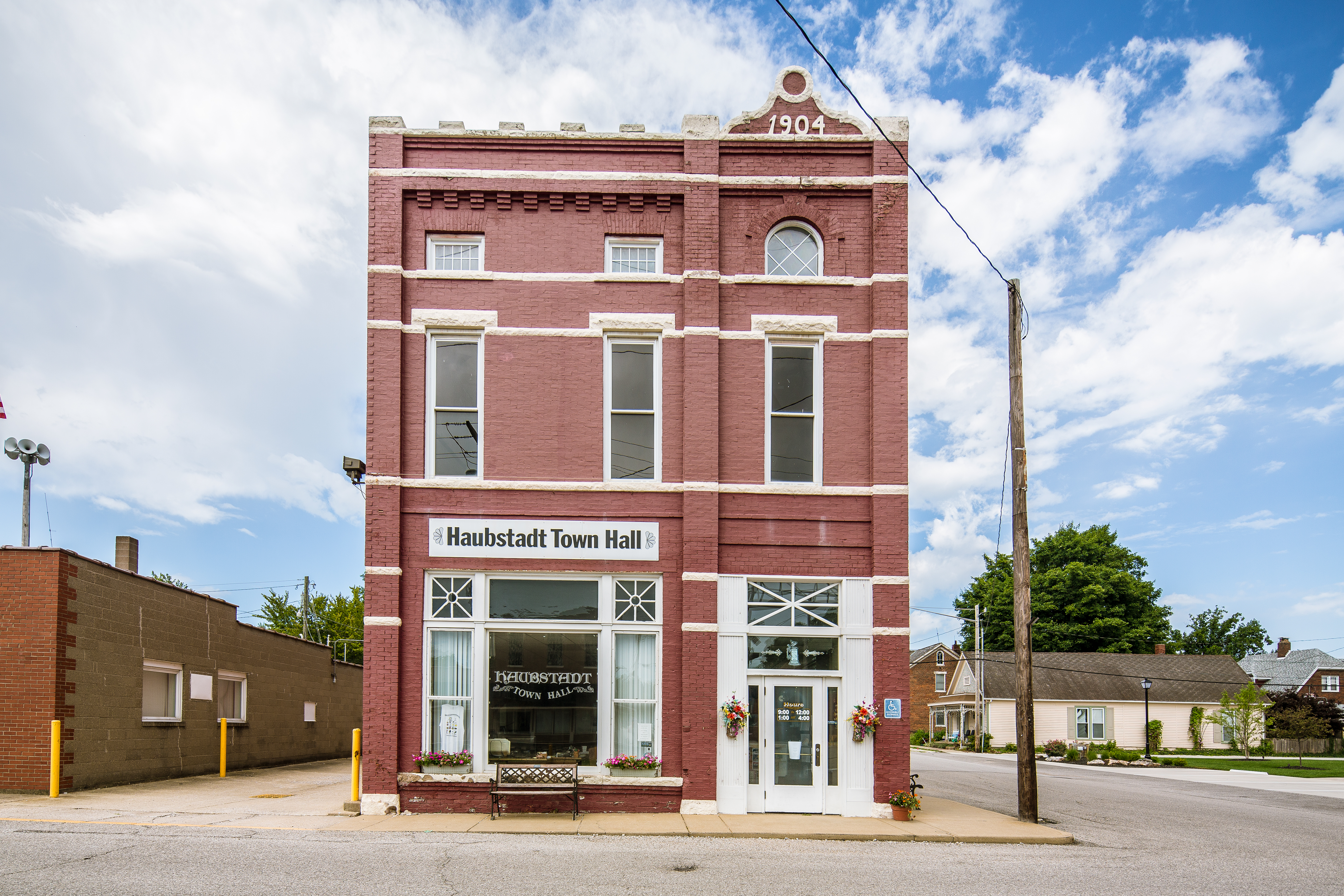
- Haubstadt's town hall
- Motto(s): "Preserving Our Past, Planning Our Future"
- Location of Haubstadt in Gibson County, Indiana.
- Coordinates: 38°12′14″N 87°34′31″W
- Country: United States
- State: Indiana
- County: Gibson
- Township: Johnson
- Named after: Henry Haub

Area
  - Total: 0.72 sq mi (1.87 km^{2})
  - Land: 0.71 sq mi (1.85 km^{2})
  - Water: 0.0077 sq mi (0.02 km^{2})
- Elevation: 479 ft (146 m)

Population (2020)
  - Total: 1,638
  - Density: 2,296.9/sq mi (886.83/km^{2})
- Time zone: UTC-6 (CST)
  - Summer (DST): UTC-5 (CDT)
- ZIP code: 47639
- Area codes: 812, 930
- FIPS code: 18-32512
- GNIS feature ID: 2396991
- Website: www.haubstadt.net

Haubstadt is the second-largest town, after Fort Branch, and fourth-largest community in Gibson County, Indiana, United States. The population was 1,638 at the 2020 census. Haubstadt has recently become a bedroom community of Evansville and such, is part of the Evansville, Indiana, Metropolitan Area.

== History ==
Haubstadt was originally called Haub's Station, and under the latter name, meaning "Haub town" in German, was laid out in 1855. Named after an early settler, Henry Haub, the town was incorporated in 1913.

Haub built the community's first home, combining a stagecoach shop, general store, and trading post to accommodate travelers on the Noon Day Stage Coach route running to Vincennes. A dance hall was later also built above Mr. Haub's tavern and store.

The Haubstadt State Bank (now Town Hall) was listed on the National Register of Historic Places in 1984.

=== Haubstadt Train Wreck of 1990 ===
On June 14, 1990, a train, operated by Jacksonville, Florida-based CSX Transportation, was coming into Haubstadt from the south and around 7:00pm suddenly there was a large crash followed by a lightning-like flash from an electric pole accompanied by a thunderclap and a town-wide power failure. It did not take long for people to realize that a train had de-railed. In the derailment, at least five buildings, most of downtown and much of Haubstadt's history was destroyed in about ten seconds. When it was later learned the train was possibly carrying ammonia, Haubstadt was mostly evacuated, mainly by people with respiratory illnesses such as asthma. It was later found that the ammonia cars were empty and that the smell was residue that was released into the air. It was also discovered that the tracks had not been maintained properly and that a couple of loose ties coupled with the speed at which the trains move through Haubstadt and neighboring Fort Branch (between 55 - 65 mph) were to blame for the accident. There is fear among many in Haubstadt and nearby Fort Branch and Princeton that a worse train wreck may occur as the track's speed limit was increased to 70 mph from Princeton to Darmstadt in 2000.

== Geography ==
According to the 2010 census, Haubstadt has a total area of 0.71 square miles (1.84 km^{2}), of which 0.7 square miles (1.81 km^{2}) (or 98.59%) is land and 0.01 square miles (0.03 km^{2}) (or 1.41%) is water.

Haubstadt has several schools, including Haubstadt Community School (or HCS), Saints Peter and Paul (or Sts. P&P), and Saint James, located approximately 2 miles south of town.

The Haubstadt area has two catholic churches, Saint James and Saints Peter & Paul, both having their own K-8 schools, plus several smaller churches scattered in town or around the surrounding Johnson Township.

== Demographics ==
Historical population
Census	Pop.	Note	%±
1880	278		—
1930	674		—
1940	762		13.1%
1950	894		17.3%
1960	1,029		15.1%
1970	1,171		13.8%
1980	1,389		18.6%
1990	1,455		4.8%
2000	1,529		5.1%
2010	1,577		3.1%
2020	1,638		3.9%
U.S. Decennial Census

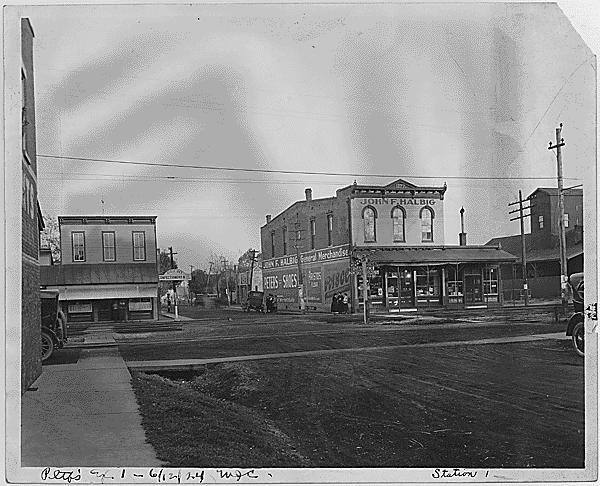
Town of Haubstadt, Indiana, 1924

=== 2020 census ===
As of the 2020 census, Haubstadt had a population of 1,638. The median age was 42.2 years. 22.0% of residents were under the age of 18 and 21.6% of residents were 65 years of age or older. For every 100 females there were 96.2 males, and for every 100 females age 18 and over there were 88.8 males age 18 and over.

0.0% of residents lived in urban areas, while 100.0% lived in rural areas.

There were 737 households in Haubstadt, of which 26.1% had children under the age of 18 living in them. Of all households, 49.1% were married-couple households, 17.1% were households with a male householder and no spouse or partner present, and 30.3% were households with a female householder and no spouse or partner present. About 37.9% of all households were made up of individuals and 19.9% had someone living alone who was 65 years of age or older.

There were 780 housing units, of which 5.5% were vacant. The homeowner vacancy rate was 0.7% and the rental vacancy rate was 8.3%.

Racial composition as of the 2020 census
Race	Number	Percent
White	1,601	97.7%
Black or African American	1	0.1%
American Indian and Alaska Native	4	0.2%
Asian	2	0.1%
Native Hawaiian and Other Pacific Islander	0	0.0%
Some other race	1	0.1%
Two or more races	29	1.8%
Hispanic or Latino (of any race)	21	1.3%

=== 2010 census ===
As of the census of 2010, there were 1,577 people, 667 households, and 431 families living in the town. The population density was 2,252.9 inhabitants per square mile (869.8/km^{2}). There were 701 housing units at an average density of 1,001.4 per square mile (386.6/km^{2}). The racial makeup of the town was 98.2% White, 0.6% African American, 0.2% Native American, 0.2% Asian, 0.2% from other races, and 0.6% from two or more races. Hispanic or Latino of any race were 0.6% of the population.

There were 667 households, of which 29.1% had children under the age of 18 living with them, 52.5% were married couples living together, 6.9% had a female householder with no husband present, 5.2% had a male householder with no wife present, and 35.4% were non-families. 31.3% of all households were made up of individuals, and 13.2% had someone living alone who was 65 years of age or older. The average household size was 2.35 and the average family size was 2.96.

The median age in the town was 41.1 years. 23% of residents were under the age of 18; 7.2% were between the ages of 18 and 24; 25.1% were from 25 to 44; 27.9% were from 45 to 64; and 16.7% were 65 years of age or older. The gender makeup of the town was 50.3% male and 49.7% female.

=== 2000 census ===
As of the census of 2000, there were 1,529 people, 613 households, and 424 families living in the town. The population density was 2,232.1 inhabitants per square mile (861.8/km^{2}). There were 640 housing units at an average density of 934.3 per square mile (360.7/km^{2}). The racial makeup of the town was 99.67% White, 0.07% African American, 0.07% Asian, 0.07% from other races, and 0.13% from two or more races. Hispanic or Latino of any race were 0.13% of the population.

There were 613 households, of which 34.6% had children under the age of 18 living with them, 59.7% were married couples living together, 7.5% had a female householder with no husband present, and 30.7% were non-families. 28.7% of all households were made up of individuals, and 12.9% had someone living alone who was 65 years of age or older. The average household size was 2.48 and the average family size was 3.08.

In the town, the population was spread out, with 26.8% under the age of 18, 5.6% from 18 to 24, 30.3% from 25 to 44, 21.1% from 45 to 64, and 16.3% who were 65 years of age or older. The median age was 38 years. For every 100 females, there were 99.1 males. For every 100 females age 18 and over, there were 95.6 males.

The median income for a household in the town was $42,837, and the median income for a family was $54,000. Males had a median income of $37,098 versus $24,750 for females. The per capita income for the town was $22,482. About 4.0% of families and 5.7% of the population were below the poverty line, including 4.3% of those under age 18 and 9.6% of those age 65 or over.

== Education ==
- South Gibson School Corporation
- K-8: Haubstadt Community School
  Sts. Peter and Paul Catholic School
  Saint James Catholic School
- 9-12: Gibson Southern High School

=== Former Schools ===
Haubstadt Johnson High School (merged into Gibson Southern High School in 1974)

=== Public library ===
Haubstadt has a public library, a branch of the Fort Branch-Johnson Township Public Library system.

== Sports ==
Tri-State Speedway, a 1/4 mile dirt oval racing track, was opened in 1957, roughly 1 mile east of town, next to US 41. and is host to World of Outlaws and USAC National Sprint Car Championship racing.
