= Leslie Irvin =

Leslie Irvin may refer to:

- Leslie L. Irvin (1895–1966), parachutist who made the first free-fall parachute jump
- Leslie Irvin (serial killer) (1924–1983), serial killer active in the Midwest in the early 1950s

== See also ==
- Les Irwin (1898–1985), Australian politician
