= Gibson County Courthouse (Indiana) =

- U.S. National Register of Historic Places
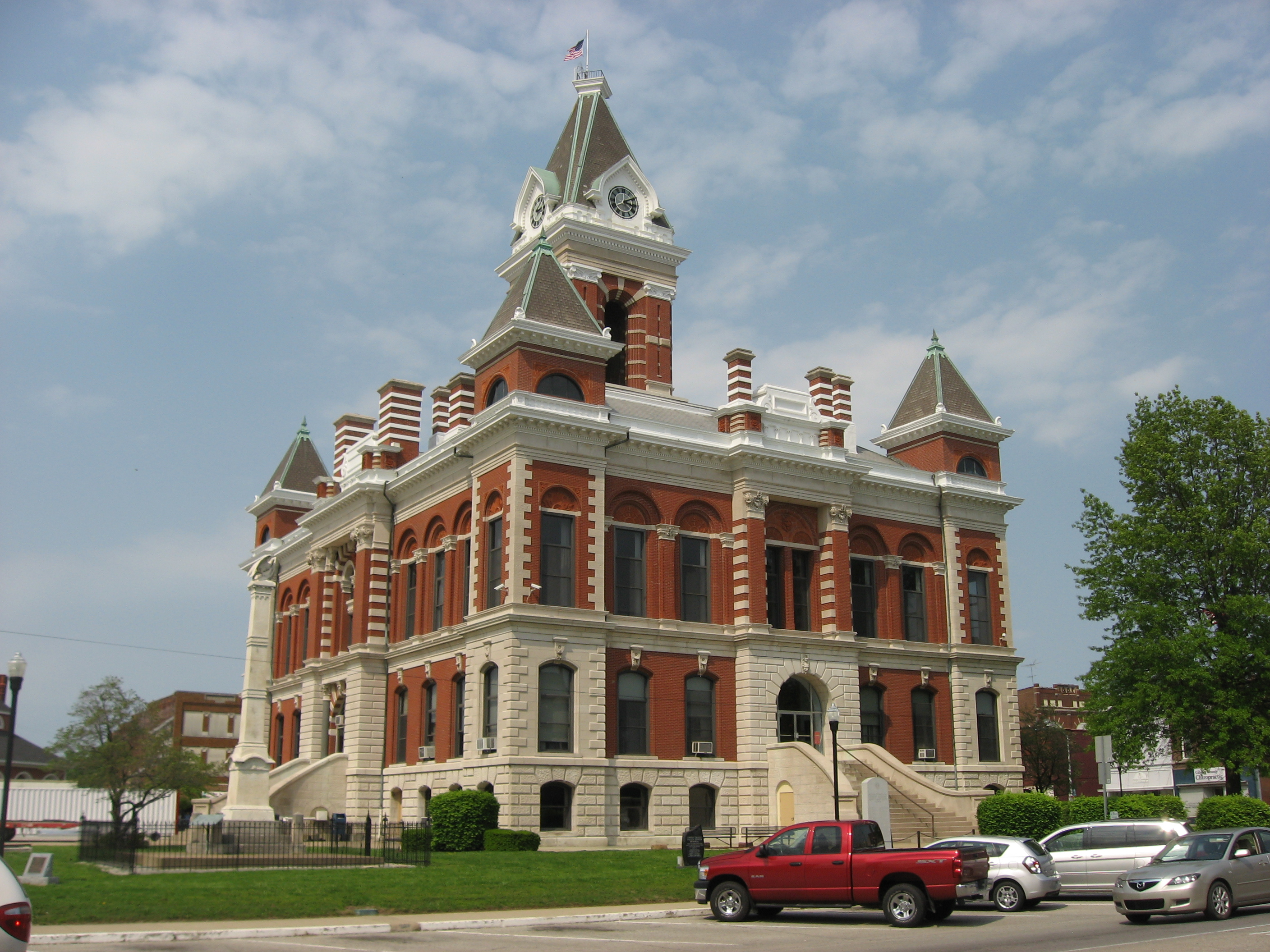
- Southern and Western fronts of the courthouse

- Location within Indiana Location within the United States
- Location: Town Square, Princeton, Indiana
- Coordinates: 38°21′19.93″N 87°34′5.27″W
- Area: 2 acres (0.81 ha)
- Built: 1883
- Architect: McDonald Brothers
- Architectural style: Romanesque Revival
- NRHP reference No.: 84001038
- Added to NRHP: September 27, 1984

Since 1815, three separate buildings have served as the Gibson County Courthouse in Princeton, Indiana, United States. The current building was constructed in 1884 and is located at the intersection of Indiana State Road 64 and Indiana State Road 65. It is an example of Romanesque Revival architecture and was the model for Department 56's Original Snow Village Courthouse. Gibson County's Courthouse is of very similar design to the Johnson County Courthouse in Franklin, Indiana.

== History ==
The residence of Judge William Harrington was first used to conduct court business. Work on the first courthouse began on September 1, 1814. The building was constructed of bricks which were made nearby on the public square. It had two floors and measured 33 feet by 40 feet. It was first occupied in June 1815.

The second courthouse was also made of brick and was completed in 1843 at a cost of about $9,000. (Note: A $9,000 capital expense in 1843 would be roughly equivalent to $5,000,000 in 2010.)

The third (and current) courthouse was built on the site of the previous building. The cornerstone was laid on June 17, 1884, accompanied by a Masonic ceremony attended by several thousand people. The McDonald Brothers of Louisville, Kentucky designed the Romanesque Revival building, which was constructed by local contractor Joseph Miller of Washington, Indiana at a cost of $188,661. (Note: A $188,000 capital expense in 1884 would be roughly equivalent to $41,700,000 in 2010.) The two-story building has a full basement and is made of red brick trimmed with stone; the interior is trimmed with black walnut and oak, and has mosaic tile floors.

The trial of Leslie Irvin (also known as "Mad Dog Irvin") was conducted here in 1955.

In 2006 and 2007, an aesthetic renovation project began. The exterior walls and corner towers as well as the central bell tower were repainted, and a gazebo donated by Toyota Motor Manufacturing Indiana was placed on the courthouse lawn.
