= Warrenton, Gibson County, Indiana =

- Unincorporated community
- Location within Indiana Location within the United States
- Coordinates: 38°10′23″N 87°31′58″W
- Country: United States
- State: Indiana
- County: Gibson
- Township: Johnson
- Elevation: 482 ft (147 m)
- ZIP code: 47639
- FIPS code: 18-80252
- GNIS feature ID: 445485

Warrenton is an unincorporated community in Johnson Township, Gibson County, Indiana. Warrenton is home to The Log Inn, the oldest restaurant in Indiana. The community is located immediately northeast of the U.S. 41-I-64 interchange.

== History ==
Warrenton was platted in 1840. It was named in honor of Joseph Warren, a patriot in the American Revolutionary War. A post office was established at Warrenton in 1841, and remained in operation until it was discontinued in 1856.

== Geography ==
Warrenton is located at 38°10′23″N 87°31′58″W.
