= WRAY (AM) =

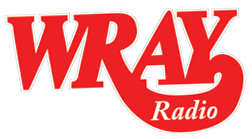
- Princeton, Indiana; United States
- Broadcast area: Evansville, Indiana
- Frequency: 1250 kHz

Programming
- Format: Talk radio

Ownership
- Owner: Princeton Broadcasting Co.
- Sister stations: WRAY-FM

History
- First air date: December 1950

Technical information
- Licensing authority: FCC
- Facility ID: 53566
- Class: D
- Power: 1,000 watts day; 59 watts night
- Transmitter coordinates: 38°21′25″N 87°35′25″W
- Translator: 94.3 W232DP (Princeton)

Links
- Public license information: Public file; LMS
- Website: www.wrayradio.com

WRAY (1250 AM) is a radio station licensed to Princeton, Indiana, United States, the station serves the Evansville area. The station is owned by Princeton Broadcasting Co.

AM and FM studios and transmitters are at 1900 West Broadway, in Princeton.
