= South Gibson School Corporation =

School district in Indiana

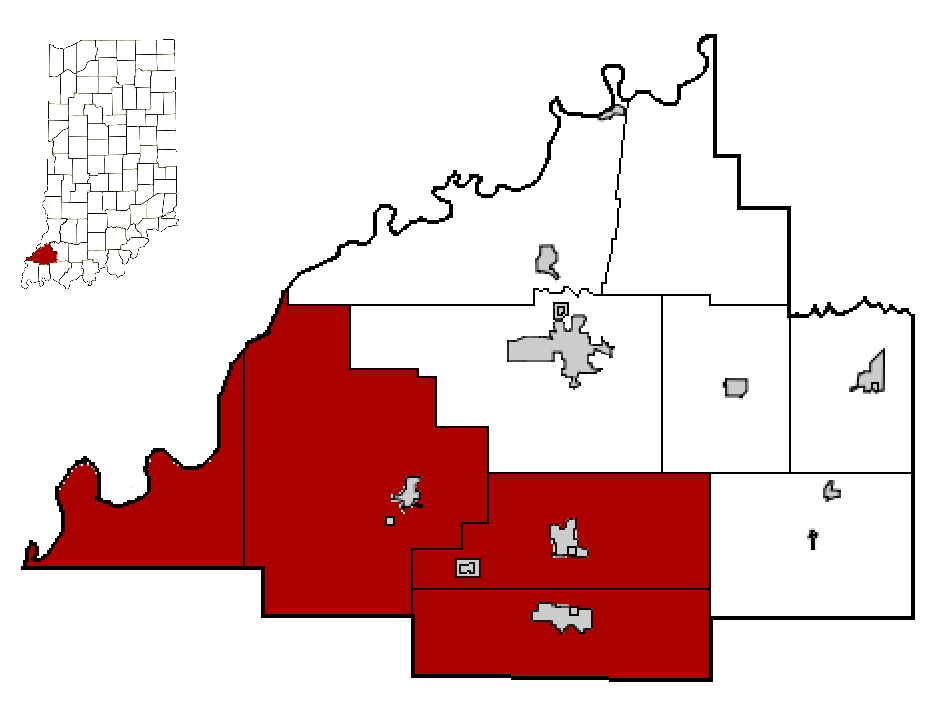
- The area served by the South Gibson School Corporation

Location
- Headquarters; 3321 W 800 S Fort Branch, Indiana, 47648; Towns Served; Fort Branch, Haubstadt, Johnson, Owensville, St. James, and Warrenton, Indiana United States

District information
- Type: Public
- Grades: K-12
- Superintendent: Dr. Stacey Humbaugh

Students and staff
- Students: 2,144
- Athletic conference: Pocket
- District mascot: Titans, Elites, Kickapoos, Twigs
- Colors: See School list below

Other information
- 2009 Graduation Rate: 90.7%
- Website: www.sgibson.k12.in.us

The South Gibson School Corporation is the largest of the three public school governing institutions in both enrollment and territory covered in Gibson County, Indiana as well as one of the ten largest in enrollment in Southwestern Indiana. The SGSC is responsible for a district including four townships of southern and southwestern Gibson County; Johnson, Montgomery, Union, Wabash, and parts of Barton, Center and Patoka Townships within Gibson County as well as drawing in students from Northern Vanderburgh and Posey Counties. It consists of a superintendent, a five-member school board, eight principals and vice principals and employs around 190 teachers and specialists. The SGSC's renovation of the then-35-year-old Gibson Southern High School was complete as of 2010-11 School Year.

== The facilities of the SGSC ==
- South Gibson has no central Middle School
- Note: Coal Mine Road is often signed as both 800S on its east terminus (Fort Branch End) and 400W
  on its north terminus (Indiana 168 or Owensville End) with the curve being about 200 feet west of the
  Gibson Southern High School Campus.

School	Grades	Size	Mascot	Colors	Address	Location
Gibson Southern High School; HomePage; 38.236377°N 87.635407°W	Freshman - Senior	750	Titans; Lady Titans		3499 W CR 800; Fort Branch, IN	3.5 miles west of US 41 on Coal Mine Road (800S) or 1 mile south of Indiana 168 from the other end of Coal Mine Road (400W).
Fort Branch Community School; HomePage; 38.23995°N 87.570369°W	Kindergarten - 8th Grade *	550	Twigs; Lady Twigs		7670 S Eastview ^{St.} Fort Branch, IN	Within newly annexed areas of Fort Branch near the intersection of US 41 and Coal Mine Road (800S)
Haubstadt Community School; HomePage; 38.206336°N 87.566823°W	Kindergarten - 8th Grade *	400	Elites; Lady Elites		609 E Gibson ^{St.} Haubstadt, IN	Within Haubstadt 1 mile from US 41 on Outer Gibson Street (1025S)
Owensville Community School; HomePage; 38.258436°N 87.699249°W	Kindergarten - 8th Grade *	500	Kickapoos; Lady Kickapoos		6965 S. Indiana 65; Owensville, IN	1 mile Southwest of Owensville on Indiana 65

== Other facilities ==
- Southern Indiana Career & Technical Center (Shared with 7 other school corporations)

== Former facilities ==
- Fort Branch Marlette High School*
- Haubstadt Johnson High School*
- Owensville Montgomery High School*
- Merged to form Gibson Southern High School in 1974.

== Neighboring corporations ==
- East Gibson School Corporation
- Evansville Vanderburgh School Corporation
- M.S.D. North Posey
- North Gibson School Corporation
- Warrick County School Corporation
- Wabash County District #348 (Illinois)

== Resources ==
- South Gibson Homepage
- Gibson Southern High School Renovation: Gibson Southern High School Renovation Project
- Schematic Design Report 02-06-07 | Wayback Machine
