= WRAY-FM =

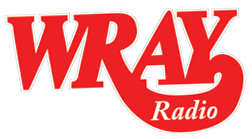
- Princeton, Indiana; United States
- Broadcast area: Evansville
- Frequency: 98.1 MHz

Programming
- Format: Country
- Affiliations: AP News; Compass Media Networks; Premiere Networks; Westwood One

Ownership
- Owner: Princeton Broadcasting Co.
- Sister stations: WRAY

History
- First air date: 1960

Technical information
- Licensing authority: FCC
- Facility ID: 53568
- Class: B
- ERP: 50,000 watts
- HAAT: 133 meters (436 ft)
- Transmitter coordinates: 38°21′25″N 87°35′25″W

Links
- Public license information: Public file; LMS
- Website: wrayradio.com

WRAY-FM (98.1 MHz) is a radio station licensed to Princeton, Indiana, United States, the station serves the Evansville area. The station is owned by Princeton Broadcasting Co.

AM and FM studios and transmitters are at 1900 West Broadway, in Princeton.
