= Gary Denbo =

American baseball executive

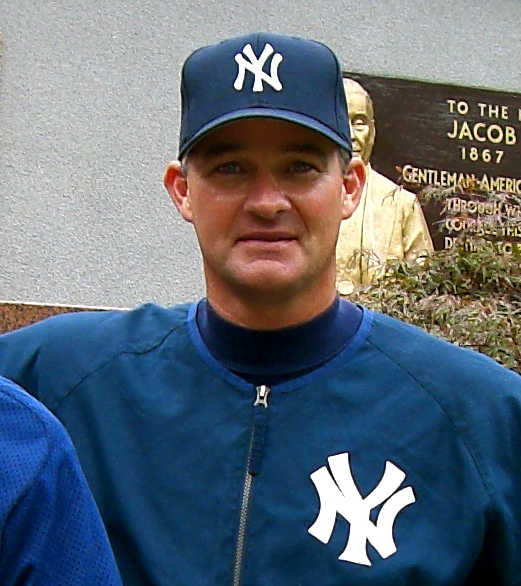
- Hitting coach
- Born: December 9, 1960 (age 65); Princeton, Indiana, U.S.
- Bats: Right Throws: Right
- Stats at Baseball Reference

Teams
- New York Yankees (2001); Toronto Blue Jays (2007–2008)

Gary Brian Denbo (born December 9, 1960) is an American former baseball front office executive and coach. He was the director of player development and scouting for the Miami Marlins of Major League Baseball (MLB). Previously, he served as a hitting coach for the New York Yankees and Toronto Blue Jays of MLB and for the Hokkaido Nippon-Ham Fighters of Nippon Professional Baseball. He has also worked in the Yankees' front office.

== Playing career ==
Denbo attended Princeton Community High School in Princeton, Indiana, and Oakland City University in Oakland City, Indiana. He was drafted as an infielder by the Cincinnati Reds in the 17th round of the 1983 Major League Baseball draft. Denbo played in Minor League Baseball for four years.

== Post-playing career ==
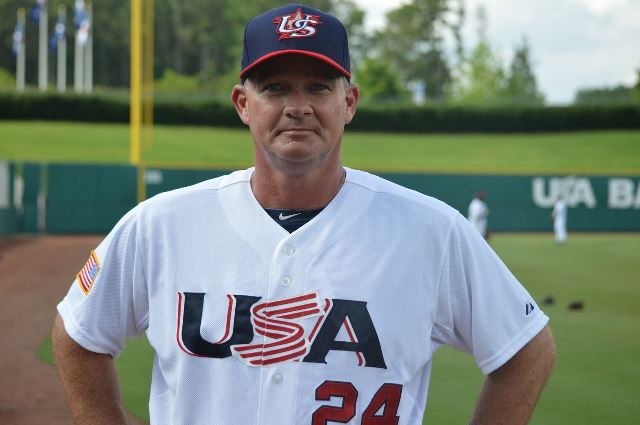
Denbo in 2014 as Hitting Consultant for USA Baseball Collegiate team

After retiring as a player, Denbo became a minor league coach and manager. Denbo took his first coaching position in 1986 as a Player-coach for the Cincinnati Reds Double-A club in Vermont. He remained with the Reds organization through 1989.

In 1990, Denbo joined the Yankees organization. He served as a hitting coach and manager for minor league teams in the Yankees organization through 1996. In 1997, he took over as the hitting coordinator for the entire Yankees organization, and in 2000 was also the Assistant Minor League Director.

In 2001, Denbo was the major league hitting coach for the New York Yankees. He also served as the hitting coach for the American League All-star team in the 2001 All-star game in Seattle.

Denbo was a scout for the Cleveland Indians in 2002. He was a hitting coach for the Hokkaido Nippon-Ham Fighters of the Pacific League in Nippon Professional Baseball from 2003 through 2005. He rejoined the Yankees organization in 2006 as the organization's hitting coordinator.

In 2008, he became the hitting coach for the Toronto Blue Jays.

In 2009, Denbo returned to the Yankees as a player development consultant, and continues in his current position in scouting and player development. While in a slump during the 2011 season, Derek Jeter worked on his swing with Denbo, which Jeter attributed to his improvement later in the season.

In June 2014, Denbo was named hitting consultant for the 2014 USA Baseball Collegiate National Team.

In October 2014 the Yankees named Denbo Vice President of Player Development. Denbo began the "Captain's Camp", an opportunity for the team's best prospects to interact with former players.

In October 2017, Denbo was named the Vice President of Scouting and Player Development for the Miami Marlins. The Marlins fired Denbo in June 2022, months after Jeter had divested from the team's ownership group.

== See also ==
- List of New York Yankees coaches

Sporting positions
Preceded by Mickey Brantley	Toronto Blue Jays Hitting Coach; October 2007 – June 2008	Succeeded by Gene Tenace
Preceded by Chris Chambliss	New York Yankees Hitting Coach; 2001	Succeeded by Rick Down
