= Princeton Daily Clarion =

The Princeton Clarion
- Type: Twice weekly newspaper
- Owner: Paxton Media Group
- Publisher: Courtney Shots
- Editor: Andrea Howe
- Language: English
- Headquarters: North Hart Street, Princeton, Indiana 47670; United States
- Website: pdclarion.com

The Princeton Clarion is a newspaper circulating Tuesday and Saturday mornings, two days a week in Princeton and Gibson County, Indiana, United States. The newspaper was founded in 1846 as a weekly edition, and is considered the oldest continuously operating newspaper in Gibson County. It is one of two newspapers in Gibson County. Previous owner Brehm Communications sold the paper to Paxton in September 2016.
