= Saint James, Indiana =

- Unincorporated community
- Location within Indiana Location within the United States
- Coordinates: 38°10′36″N 87°34′39″W
- Country: United States
- State: Indiana
- County: Gibson
- Township: Johnson
- Elevation: 502 ft (153 m)
- ZIP code: 47639
- FIPS code: 18-66816
- GNIS feature ID: 442547

Saint James is a small hamlet located roughly 1 mile south of Haubstadt, Indiana in Johnson Township, Gibson County, Indiana, United States, and 1/4 mile north of Vanderburgh County.

Saint James took its name from St. James Roman Catholic Church. The church is the oldest Catholic congregation in Gibson County.

It was a stop on the Evansville and Crawfordsville Railroad.

== Geography ==
Saint James is located at 38°10′36″N 87°34′39″W.
