= Haubstadt State Bank =

- U.S. National Register of Historic Places
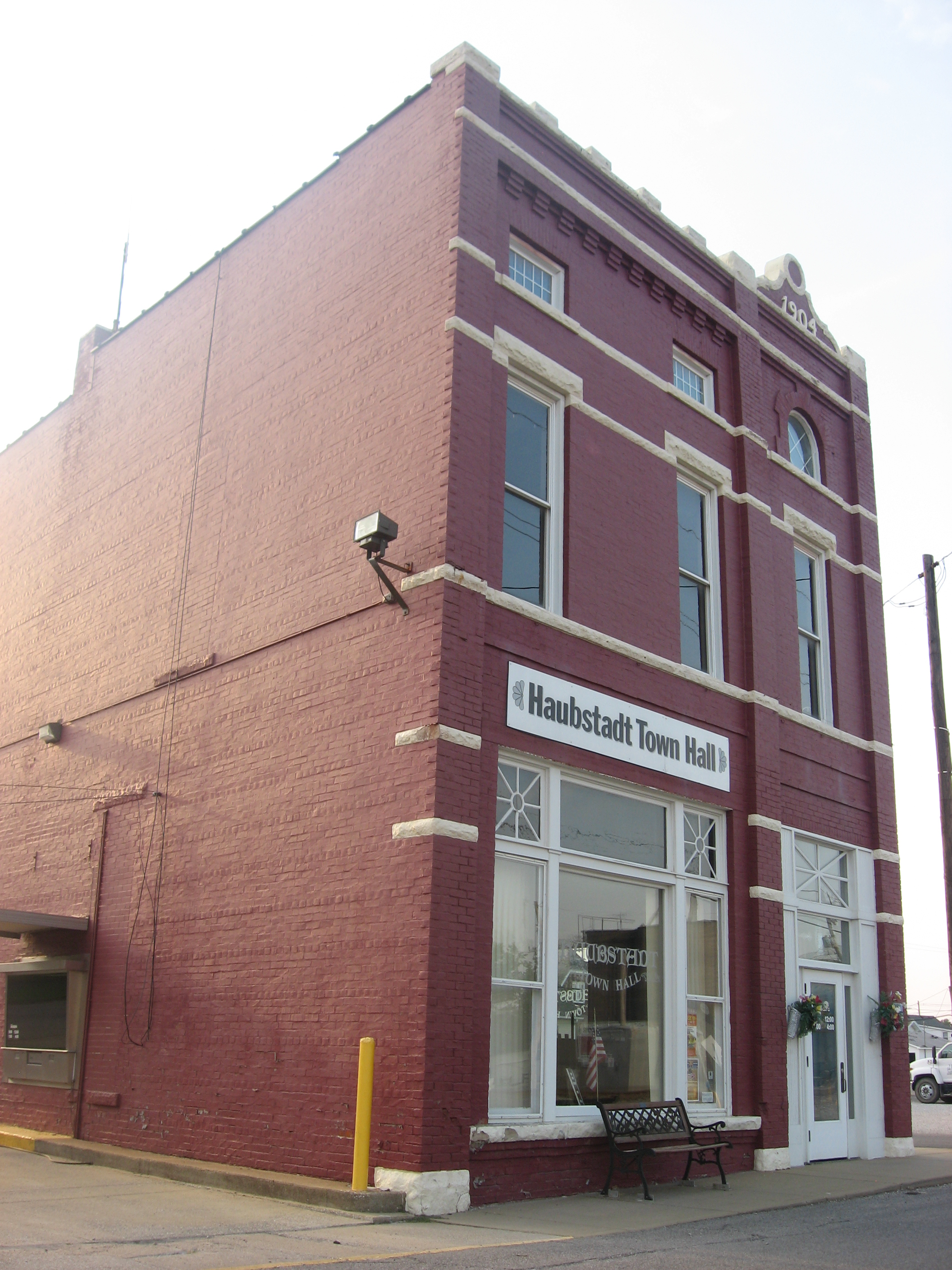
- Haubstadt State Bank, September 2011

- Location within Indiana Location within the United States
- Location: 101 S. Main St., Haubstadt, Indiana
- Coordinates: 38°12′18″N 87°34′28″W
- Area: less than one acre
- Built: 1904
- Built by: Jost, J.
- NRHP reference No.: 84000489
- Added to NRHP: December 27, 1984

Haubstadt State Bank, also known as Old Haubstadt State Bank and New Town Hall, is a historic bank building located at Haubstadt, Indiana. It was built in 1904, and is a 2 1/2-story, brick and Indiana limestone building with two additions. It features Chicago style commercial window openings. The building was remodeled in 1954. The bank became the town hall in 1980.

It was listed on the National Register of Historic Places in 1984.
