= Owensville, Indiana =

- Town
- Town of Owensville
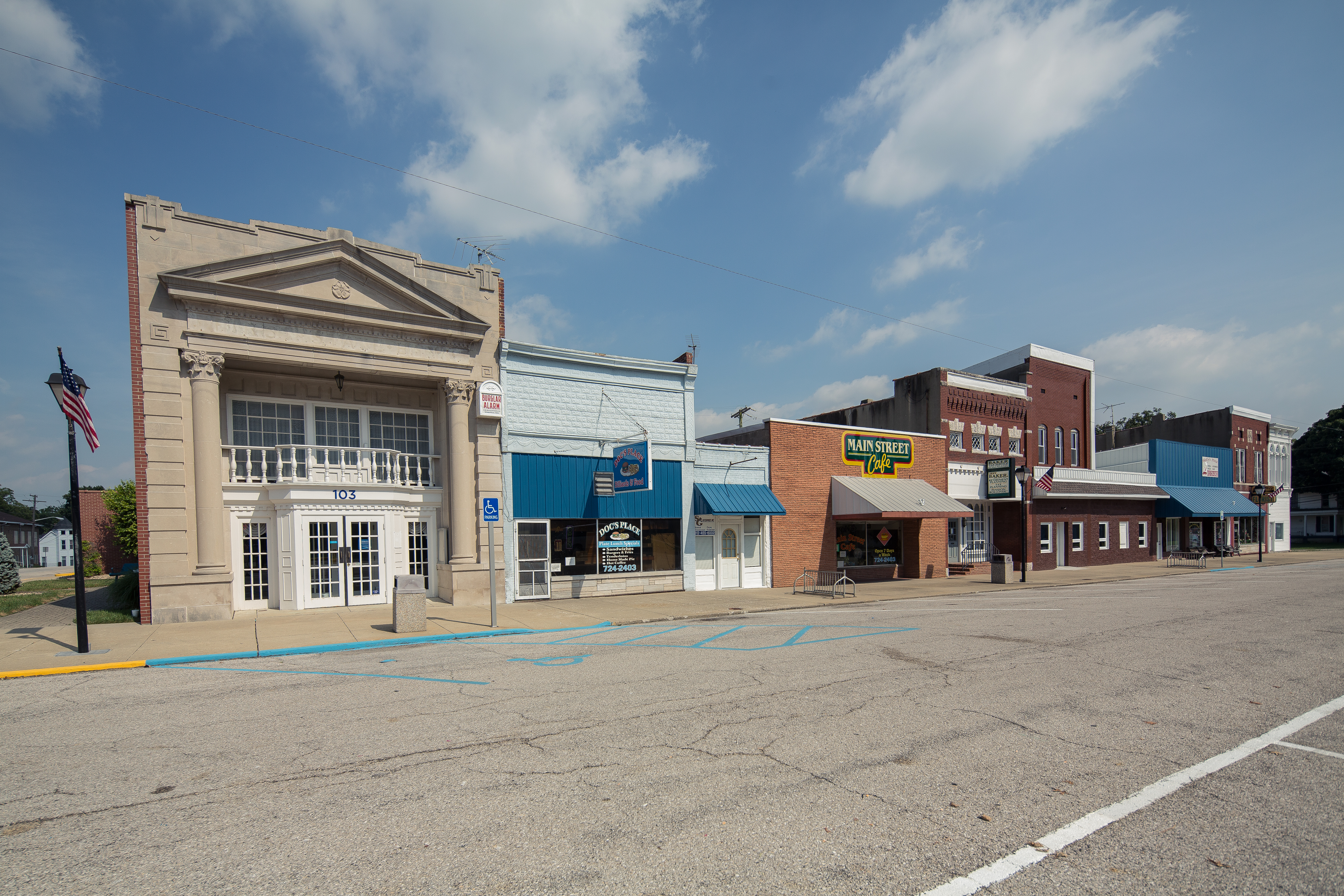
- Row of buildings along east side of town square. Owensville Town Hall is on far left.

- Seal

- Location of Owensville in Gibson County, Indiana
- Coordinates: 38°16′19″N 87°41′30″W
- Country: United States
- State: Indiana
- County: Gibson
- Township: Montgomery
- Founded: 1817

Area
  - Total: 0.57 sq mi (1.47 km^{2})
  - Land: 0.57 sq mi (1.47 km^{2})
  - Water: 0 sq mi (0.00 km^{2})
- Elevation: 525 ft (160 m)

Population (2020)
  - Total: 1,338
  - Density: 2,351.5/sq mi (907.92/km^{2})
- Time zone: UTC-6 (Central (CST))
  - Summer (DST): UTC-5 (CDT)
- ZIP code: 47665
- Area codes: 812, 930
- FIPS code: 18-57528
- GNIS feature ID: 2396843
- Website: owensville.org

Owensville is the third largest town and the smallest of the five larger communities in Gibson County, Indiana, United States. The population was 1,338 in 2020.

== History ==
Owensville was established in 1817 by Phillip Briscoe, when he filed the town plat consisting of 52 parcels and five out-parcels. It is unknown as to whether the town was named for Robert Dale Owen, namesake of nearby Dale, Indiana , Col. Abraham Owen, namesake of Owensboro, Kentucky and both Owen County, Indiana and Owen County, Kentucky. A fire in 1876 destroyed many of the wood framed businesses on the eastern side of the town square.

It was not until 1881 that Owensville incorporated.

On March 18, 1925, the Tri-State Tornado struck just northwest of the town, killing nine people.

On February 28, 2017, an EF3 wedge tornado, originating in Crossville, Illinois, passed to the south of the town, destroying or heavily damaging several structures along Indiana 65 and Indiana 168. The highway was closed for several days as power crews replaced several large power poles.

On April 8, 2024, Owensville, along with most of the rest of Southwestern Indiana, viewed a total solar eclipse, lasting approximately 3 minutes and 55 seconds.

== Geography ==
Owensville is located at 38°16′18″N 87°41′26″W (38.271769, -87.690652).

According to the 2010 census, Owensville has a total area of 0.59 square miles (1.53 km^{2}), all land.

=== Climate ===
The climate in this area is characterized by hot, humid summers and generally mild to cool winters. According to the Köppen Climate Classification system, Owensville has a humid subtropical climate, abbreviated "Cfa" on climate maps, although areas just north of town have a humid continental climate. Local meteorologists often tend to use nearby Interstate 64 for comparison of local weather events.

In relation to climate, in 2004, the National Weather Service installed a NEXRAD Doppler Radar station approximately 2 miles west of the town.

== Demographics ==
Historical population
Census	Pop.	Note	%±
1850	235		—
1860	491		108.9%
1870	522		6.3%
1880	685		31.2%
1890	759		10.8%
1900	1,019		34.3%
1910	1,237		21.4%
1920	1,239		0.2%
1930	1,056		−14.8%
1940	1,188		12.5%
1950	1,110		−6.6%
1960	1,121		1.0%
1970	1,056		−5.8%
1980	1,261		19.4%
1990	1,053		−16.5%
2000	1,322		25.5%
2010	1,284		−2.9%
2020	1,338		4.2%
U.S. Decennial Census

=== 2020 census ===
As of the 2020 census, there were 1,338 people in the town. The median age was 38.8 years. 24.7% of residents were under the age of 18 and 19.2% of residents were 65 years of age or older. For every 100 females there were 92.5 males, and for every 100 females age 18 and over there were 87.9 males age 18 and over.

0.0% of residents lived in urban areas, while 100.0% lived in rural areas.

There were 524 households in the town, of which 33.4% had children under the age of 18 living in them. Of all households, 43.9% were married-couple households, 19.5% were households with a male householder and no spouse or partner present, and 28.8% were households with a female householder and no spouse or partner present. About 33.3% of all households were made up of individuals and 14.9% had someone living alone who was 65 years of age or older.

There were 557 housing units, of which 5.9% were vacant. The homeowner vacancy rate was 0.8% and the rental vacancy rate was 3.7%.

Racial composition as of the 2020 census
Race	Number	Percent
White	1,217	91.0%
Black or African American	16	1.2%
American Indian and Alaska Native	5	0.4%
Asian	5	0.4%
Native Hawaiian and Other Pacific Islander	0	0.0%
Some other race	1	0.1%
Two or more races	94	7.0%
Hispanic or Latino (of any race)	42	3.1%

=== 2010 census ===
As of the census of 2010, there were 1,284 people, 510 households, and 337 families living in the town. The population density was 2,176.3 inhabitants per square mile (840.3/km^{2}). There were 567 housing units at an average density of 961.0 per square mile (371.0/km^{2}). The racial makeup of the town was 97.9% White, 0.2% African American, 0.7% Native American, 0.2% Asian, and 0.9% from two or more races. Hispanic or Latino people of any race were 1.2% of the population.

There were 510 households, of which 33.1% had children under the age of 18 living with them, 48.8% were married couples living together, 12.9% had a female householder with no husband present, 4.3% had a male householder with no wife present, and 33.9% were non-families. 29.0% of all households were made up of individuals, and 15.7% had someone living alone who was 65 years of age or older. The average household size was 2.41 and the average family size was 2.97.

The median age in the town was 40.6 years. 24% of residents were under the age of 18; 7.8% were between the ages of 18 and 24; 23.5% were from 25 to 44; 24.8% were from 45 to 64; and 19.9% were 65 years of age or older. The gender makeup of the town was 47.5% male and 52.5% female.

=== 2000 census ===
As of the census of 2000, there were 1,322 people, 523 households, and 359 families living in the town. The population density was 2,665.3 inhabitants per square mile (1,029.1/km^{2}). There were 565 housing units at an average density of 1,139.1 per square mile (439.8/km^{2}). The racial makeup of the town was 98.18% White, 0.23% African American, 0.38% Native American, 0.23% Asian, 0.53% from other races, and 0.45% from two or more races. Hispanic or Latino people of any race were 1.13% of the population.

There were 523 households, out of which 32.9% had children under the age of 18 living with them, 56.0% were married couples living together, 10.3% had a female householder with no husband present, and 31.2% were non-families. 28.3% of all households were made up of individuals, and 16.4% had someone living alone who was 65 years of age or older. The average household size was 2.41 and the average family size was 2.94.

In the town, the population was spread out, with 24.4% under the age of 18, 6.8% from 18 to 24, 27.7% from 25 to 44, 19.3% from 45 to 64, and 21.9% who were 65 years of age or older. The median age was 39 years. For every 100 females, there were 89.4 males. For every 100 females age 18 and over, there were 82.1 males.

The median income for a household in the town was $34,306, and the median income for a family was $40,263. Males had a median income of $35,294 versus $23,897 for females. The per capita income for the town was $15,916. About 5.2% of families and 8.9% of the population were below the poverty line, including 8.7% of those under age 18 and 8.1% of those age 65 or over.

== Education ==
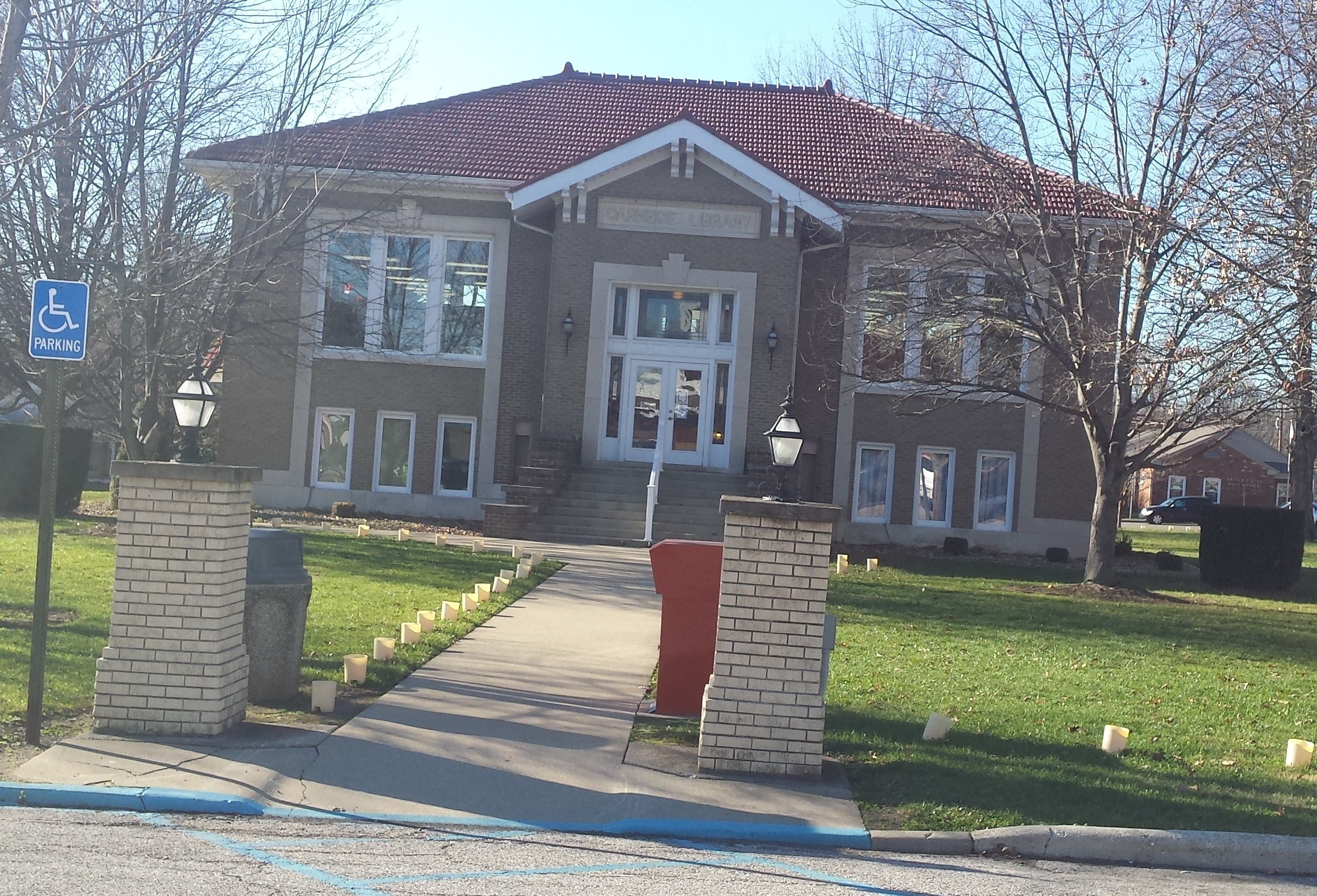
The Owensville Carnegie Library

- South Gibson School Corporation
- K-8: Owensville Community School
- 9-12: Gibson Southern High School

=== Former schools ===
- Owensville High School (merged into Gibson Southern High School in 1974)

=== Public library ===
The town has a lending library, the Owensville Carnegie Public Library.

== Economy ==
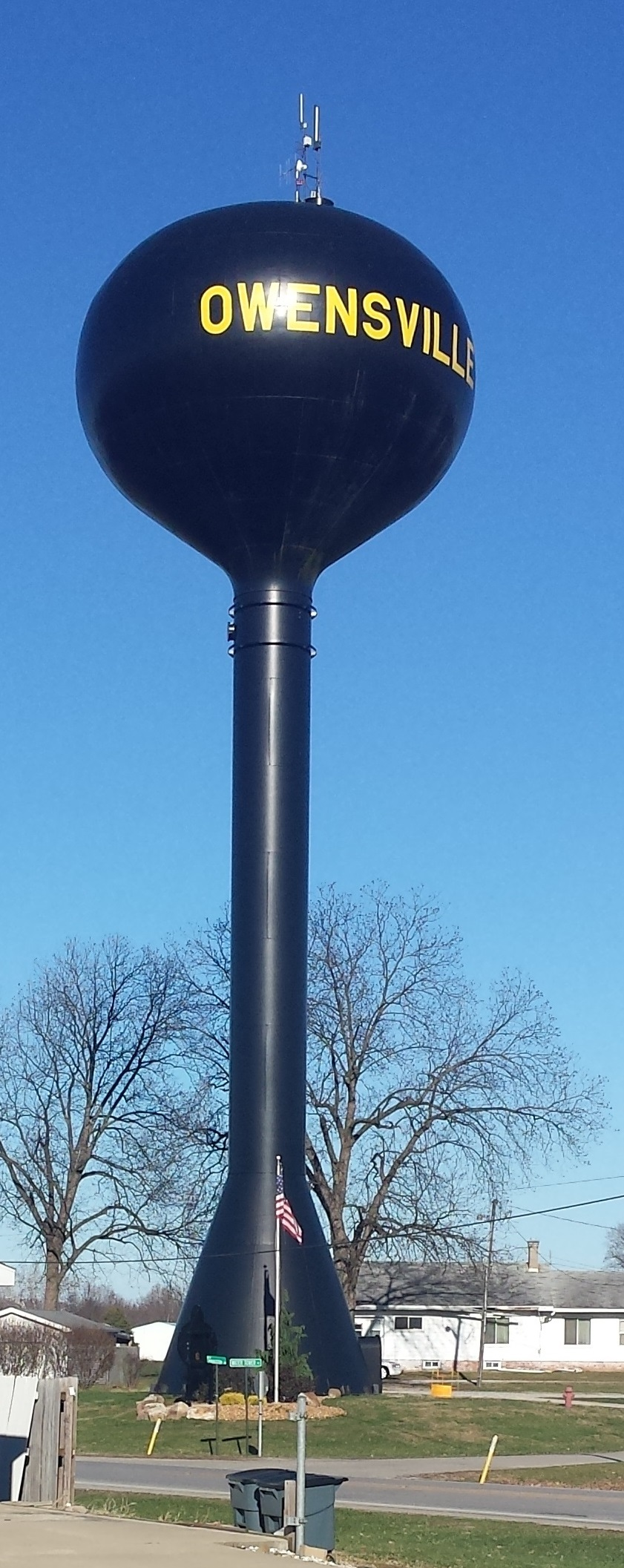
Owensville's uniquely black coated water tower in 2015. Recently been painted gold with the town's Kickapoo logo.

Unlike Princeton and Fort Branch, Owensville's economy practically consists of a scant few family-owned business with only three exceptions: Goodlettsville, Tennessee-based Dollar General, Mount Carmel, Illinois-based Community Natural Gas, and Mount Vernon, Indiana-based Schultheis Insurance. The largest family-owned business in Owensville is Holder's Furniture. However, like Fort Branch, Owensville is largely surrounded by unincorporated subdivisions, primarily north of the town. The two largest employers of Owensville's residents are the Toyota Motor Manufacturing Indiana plant located halfway between Princeton and Fort Branch, as well as Gibson Generating Station located 5.5 miles north-northwest of Owensville, as well two coal mines that opened up in 2008 and 2014, located 6 miles and 1 mile north of town respectively.

Like the other communities in Gibson County, Owensville's prime economy is based on agriculture. The farms immediately around the town primarily produce corn, soybeans, strawberries, and wheat. Like many other communities along the Lower Wabash Valley, the surrounding Montgomery Township is particularly known for its watermelons, pumpkins, squash, cantaloupes, and zucchini, all heavily produced in the sandy bottom grounds located from the north to the southwest of the town. In addition, milo tends to be produced in place of corn in areas prone to flooding from the Wabash, Patoka, or Black Rivers or any of the other smaller creeks or streams that flow into them.

Owensville High School, which merged with Fort Branch and Haubstadt high schools to form Gibson Southern, had the first high school gymnasium in Indiana with a glass backboard. One of those backboards is now in the Indiana High School Basketball Hall of Fame in New Castle, Indiana.

== Highways - local names ==
- Indiana State Road 65 - First, Brummitt, and Mill Streets from north to south
- Indiana State Road 165 - Brummitt Street west of Mill Street
- Indiana State Road 168 - Walnut Street east of Mill Street

== Notable people ==
- Max Armstrong, farm news radio and television broadcaster reporting on American and worldwide agriculture
- Valeska Suratt, silent film star, Broadway actress, Vaudevillian, early fashion icon
