= Francisco, Indiana =

- Town
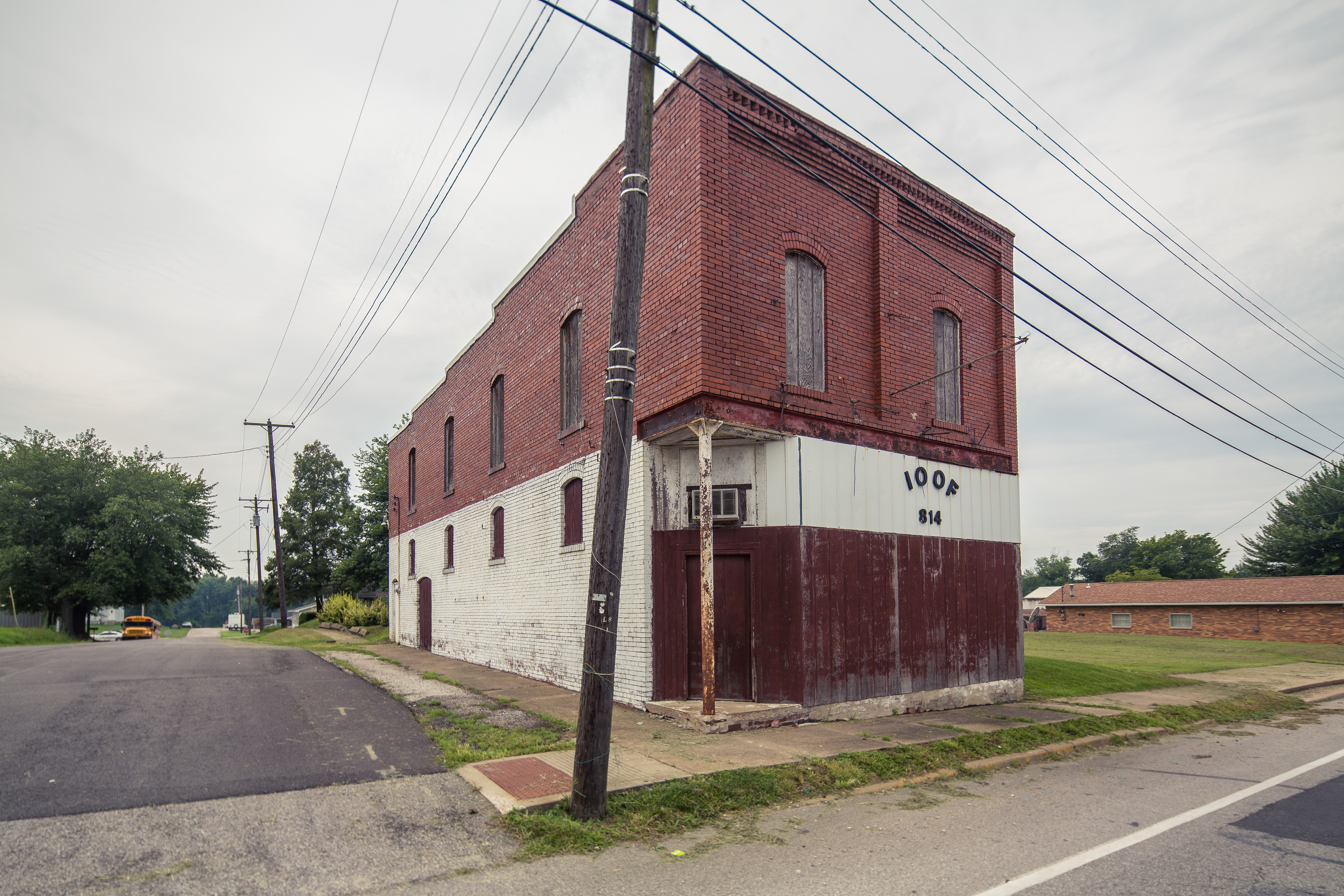
- Nickname: "Frisco"
- Location of Francisco in Gibson County, Indiana.
- Coordinates: 38°19′58″N 87°26′53″W
- Country: United States
- State: Indiana
- County: Gibson
- Township: Center

Area
  - Total: 0.62 sq mi (1.60 km^{2})
  - Land: 0.61 sq mi (1.58 km^{2})
  - Water: 0.0077 sq mi (0.02 km^{2})
- Elevation: 449 ft (137 m)

Population (2020)
  - Total: 545
  - Density: 893/sq mi (344.8/km^{2})
- Time zone: UTC-6 (CST)
  - Summer (DST): UTC-5 (CDT)
- ZIP code: 47649
- Area codes: 812, 930
- FIPS code: 18-25306
- GNIS feature ID: 2396948
- Website: www.in.gov/towns/francisco/

Francisco is the fifth largest town and seventh largest community in Gibson County, Indiana, United States. A town in Center Township, it had a population of 545 at the 2020 census. It was founded in 1851. Local tradition says the town was named for its first settler, a Spanish laborer working on the Wabash and Erie Canal who built a shack in the area. It is part of the Evansville, Indiana, Metropolitan Area.

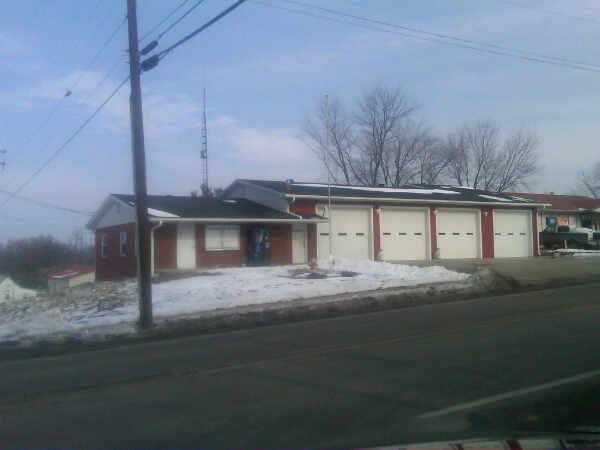
Town Hall and Volunteer Fire Department, 2011

== Geography ==
Francisco is located at 38°20′0″N 87°26′50″W (38.333360, -87.447314).

According to the 2010 census, Francisco has a total area of 0.5 square miles (1.29 km^{2}), all land.

Francisco is located on State Highway 64 between Princeton and Oakland City.

As of the census of 2010, there were 469 people, 189 households, and 119 families residing in the town. The population density was 938.0 inhabitants per square mile (362.2/km^{2}). There were 226 housing units at an average density of 452.0 per square mile (174.5/km^{2}). The racial make-up of the town was 97.0% White, 0.2% African American, 0.2% Native American, 0.2% Asian, and 2.3% from two or more races. Hispanic or Latino of any race were 0.9% of the population.

There were 189 households, of which 30.7% had children under the age of 18 living with them, 52.4% were married couples living together, 5.8% had a female householder with no husband present, 4.8% had a male householder with no wife present, and 37.0% were non-families. 31.2% of all households were made up of individuals, and 17% had someone living alone who was 65 years of age or older. The average household size was 2.48 and the average family size was 3.18.

The median age in the town was 39.6 years. 25.8% of residents were under the age of 18; 5.1% were between the ages of 18 and 24; 26.8% were from 25 to 44; 26% were from 45 to 64; and 16.2% were 65 years of age or older. The gender makeup of the town was 47.8% male and 52.2% female.

== Demographics ==
Historical population
Census	Pop.	Note	%±
1910	407		—
1920	614		50.9%
1930	728		18.6%
1940	611		−16.1%
1950	606		−0.8%
1960	565		−6.8%
1970	621		9.9%
1980	612		−1.4%
1990	560		−8.5%
2000	543		−3.0%
2010	469		−13.6%
2020	545		16.2%
U.S. Decennial Census

=== 2000 census ===
As of the census of 2000, there were 543 people, 233 households, and 150 families residing in the town. The population density was 995.5 inhabitants per square mile (384.4/km^{2}). There were 249 housing units at an average density of 456.5 per square mile (176.3/km^{2}). The racial makeup of the town was 99.26% White, 0.55% African American and 0.18% Native American. Hispanic or Latino of any race were 0.37% of the population.

There were 233 households, out of which 29.2% had children under the age of 18 living with them, 50.2% were married couples living together, 9.4% had a female householder with no husband present, and 35.2% were non-families. 30.9% of all households were made up of individuals, and 15.0% had someone living alone who was 65 years of age or older. The average household size was 2.33 and the average family size was 2.90.

In the town, the population was spread out, with 22.3% under the age of 18, 9.2% from 18 to 24, 30.2% from 25 to 44, 24.3% from 45 to 64, and 14.0% who were 65 years of age or older. The median age was 37 years. For every 100 females, there were 96.0 males. For every 100 females age 18 and over, there were 97.2 males.

The median income for a household in the town was $28,750, and the median income for a family was $39,250. Males had a median income of $32,500 versus $18,125 for females. The per capita income for the town was $15,499. About 10.6% of families and 9.5% of the population were below the poverty line, including 17.1% of those under age 18 and 2.9% of those age 65 or over.

== History ==
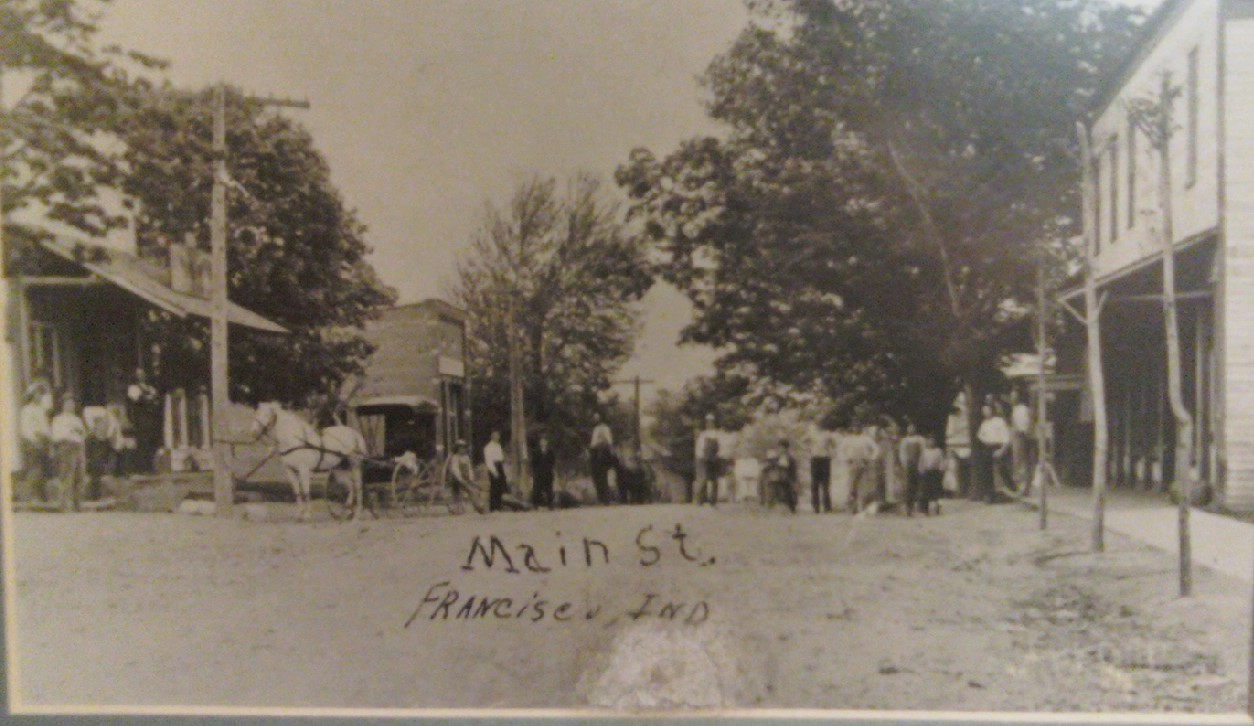
Early days on Main St.

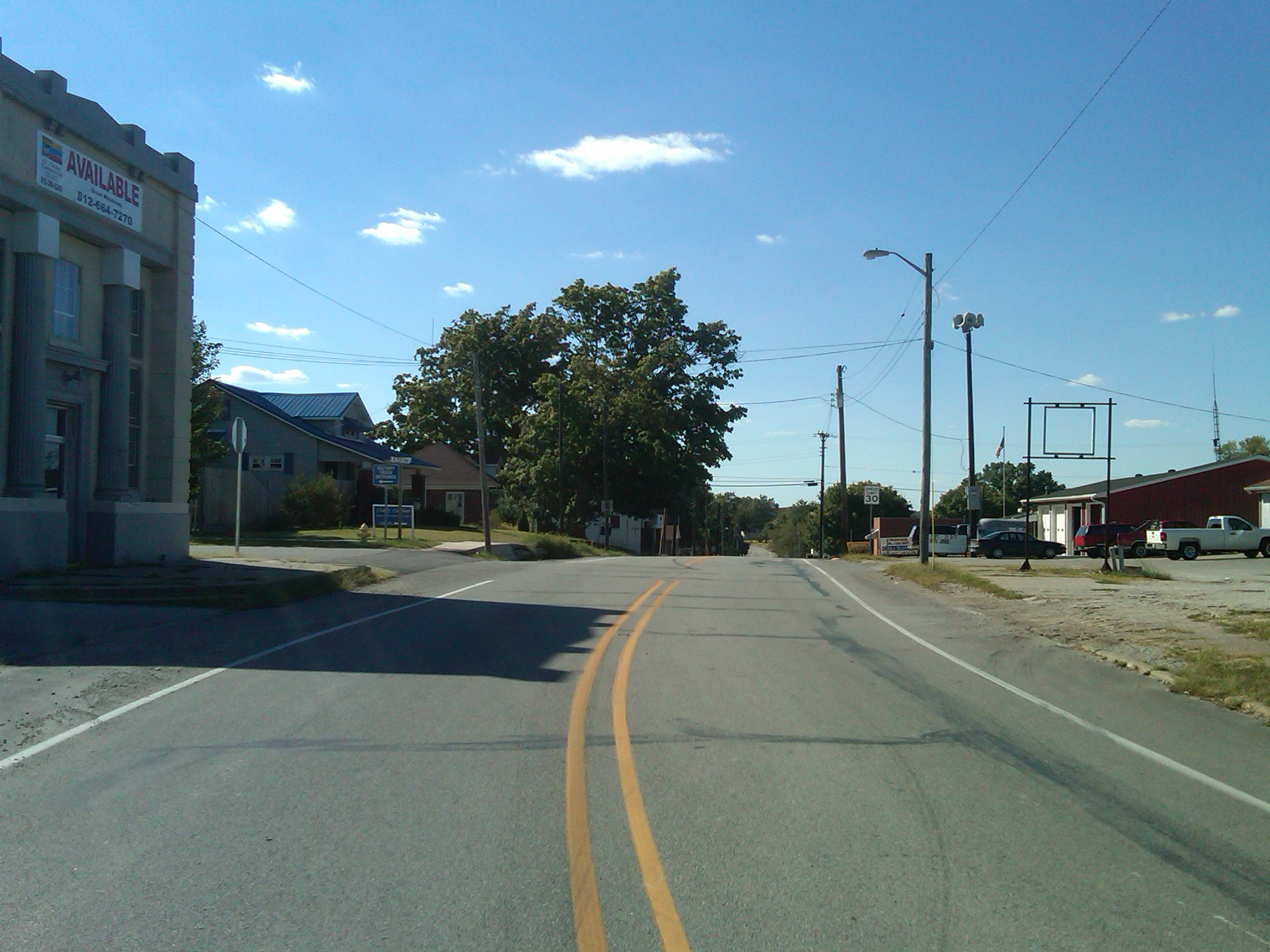
Francisco, 2010. (The tree is the same one in the center of the earlier photo above.)

The town was platted and laid out on the east side of the Wabash and Erie Canal by John Perkins in 1851. Francisco was incorporated in 1907 and the Francisco State Bank chartered a year later. Its heyday was in the mid-1850s during use of the ill-fated canal to ship goods and produce south to Evansville. Mills, grain warehouses and packing establishments thrived during the decade. Remnants of the old canal are still visible just south of Highway 64 and west of town.

== Town Hall ==
Francisco Town Hall is located at 203 West Main St/SR64 with the Fire Department.

Meetings are held the second Tuesday of every month. Wastewater meetings begin at 5:30p followed by Water & Town Business.

== Highways and rail lines ==
State Road 64

Interstate 69
(Located 2 miles east of town)

Norfolk Southern Railway

== Schools ==
Francisco Elementary School is part of the East Gibson School Corp.. F.E.S. is located on SR 64/Main St. in Francisco Indiana. The home of the Mighty Owls is grades K-6.

At least 3 schools have stood on these grounds, with the prior 2 falling to fire. The Last Francisco High School Burnt in the 1970s after being hit by lightning. The Lions Club pictured in the Gallery at the bottom of this page was built to serve as grades 5-8 during construction of a new school. Also used for classroom space was the Methodist, Baptist and Nazarene churches.

A small one-room school house once stood near the intersection of Green and School Streets and is why today the current school is not even located on the same side of town as School Street.

== Other points of interest ==
Wabash & Erie Canal

Francisco was a town built on the East Banks of the Wabash and Erie Canal. The Manmade Canal ran from Lake Erie in Ohio to the Ohio River at Evansville. Francisco was home to many Rowdy Irishmen who came to help build the canal. The Heyday for the Wabash & Erie Canal was mid-1850s and the canal was closed to traffic around 1870.

A large outbreak of cholera broke out among canal workers near Francisco around 1852; as many as 100 workers died and many more fled from the area. Those who stayed and survived were assigned the task of burying the dead. Many were buried along the banks in long trenches, while others were burnt in piles on the floor of small shanties along the canal.

Drinking establishments or Doggeries were popular among canal workers and in that day were very prominent around Francisco. Whiskey was supplied by "Jigger Bosses" to workers four times a day and caused many fights among the Irish and Americans. The Irish were generally assigned to digging with shovels, while Americans built culverts and bridges.

== Gallery ==
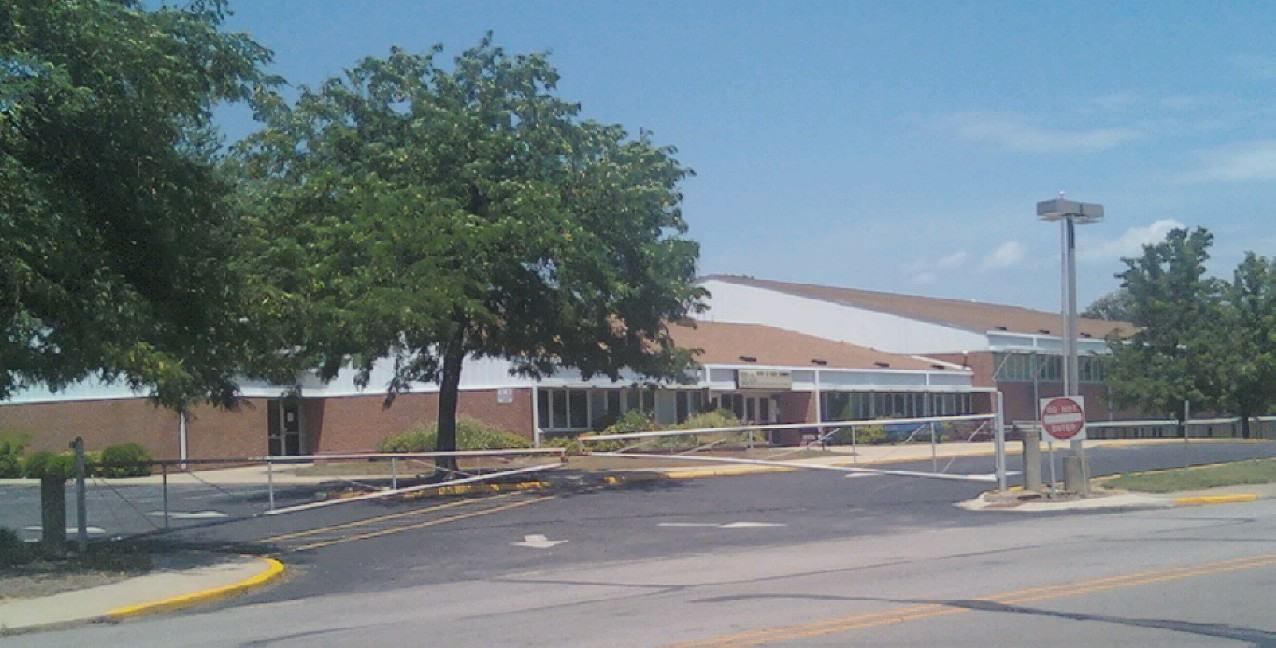
Francisco Elem. School 2010

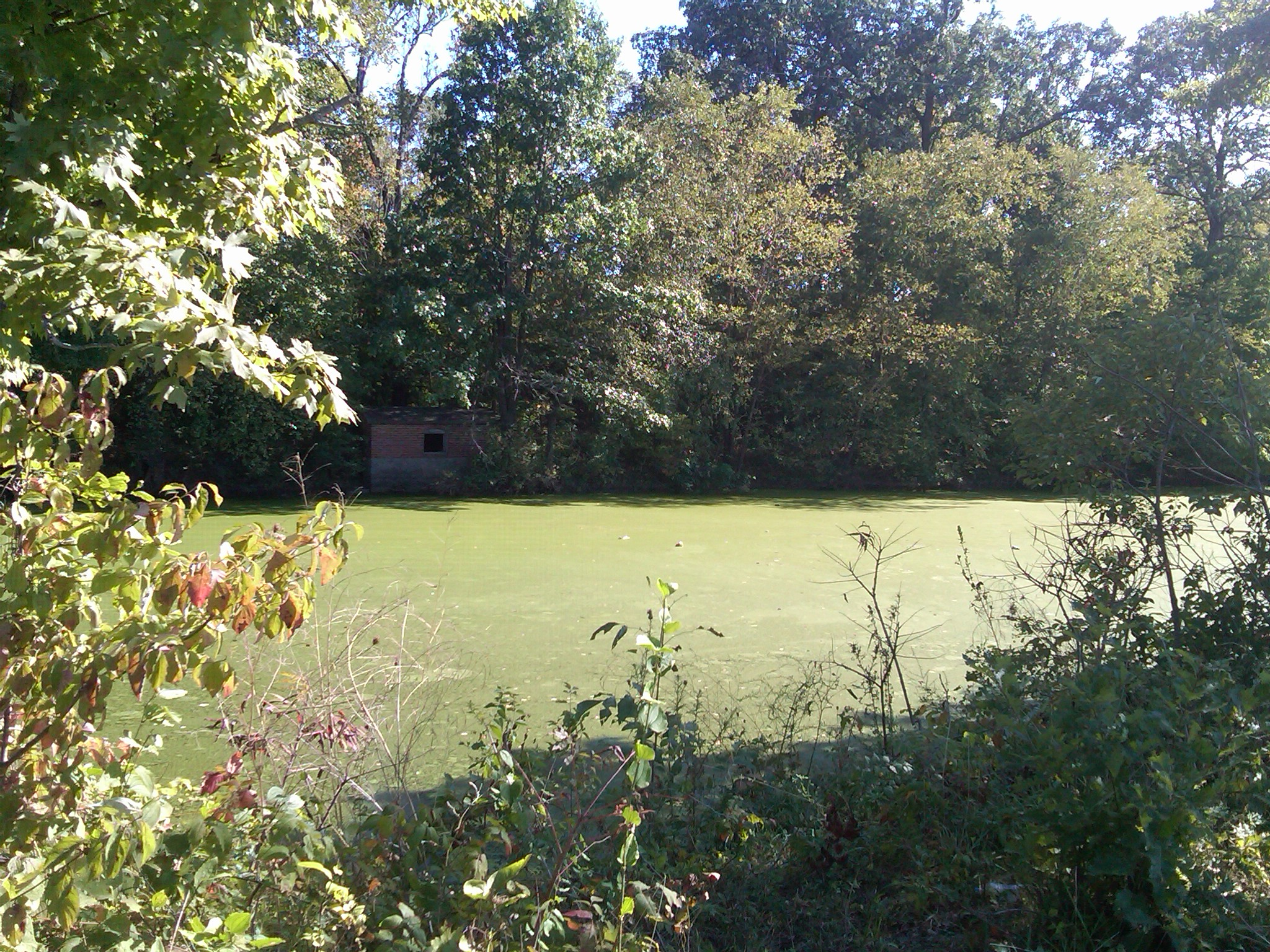
Wabash Erie Canal near Francisco

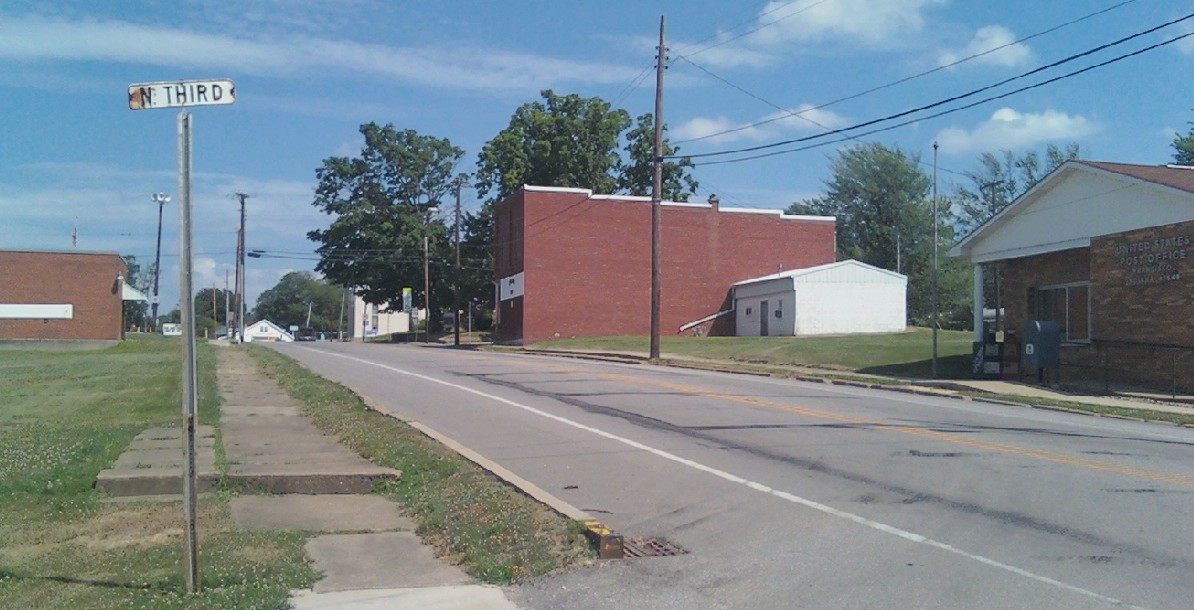
Look up Main St./SR64

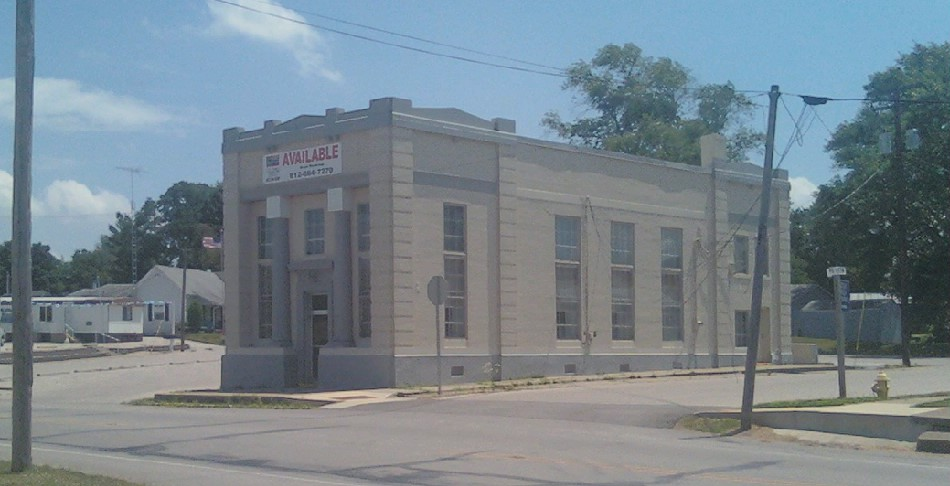
Old Francisco State Bank

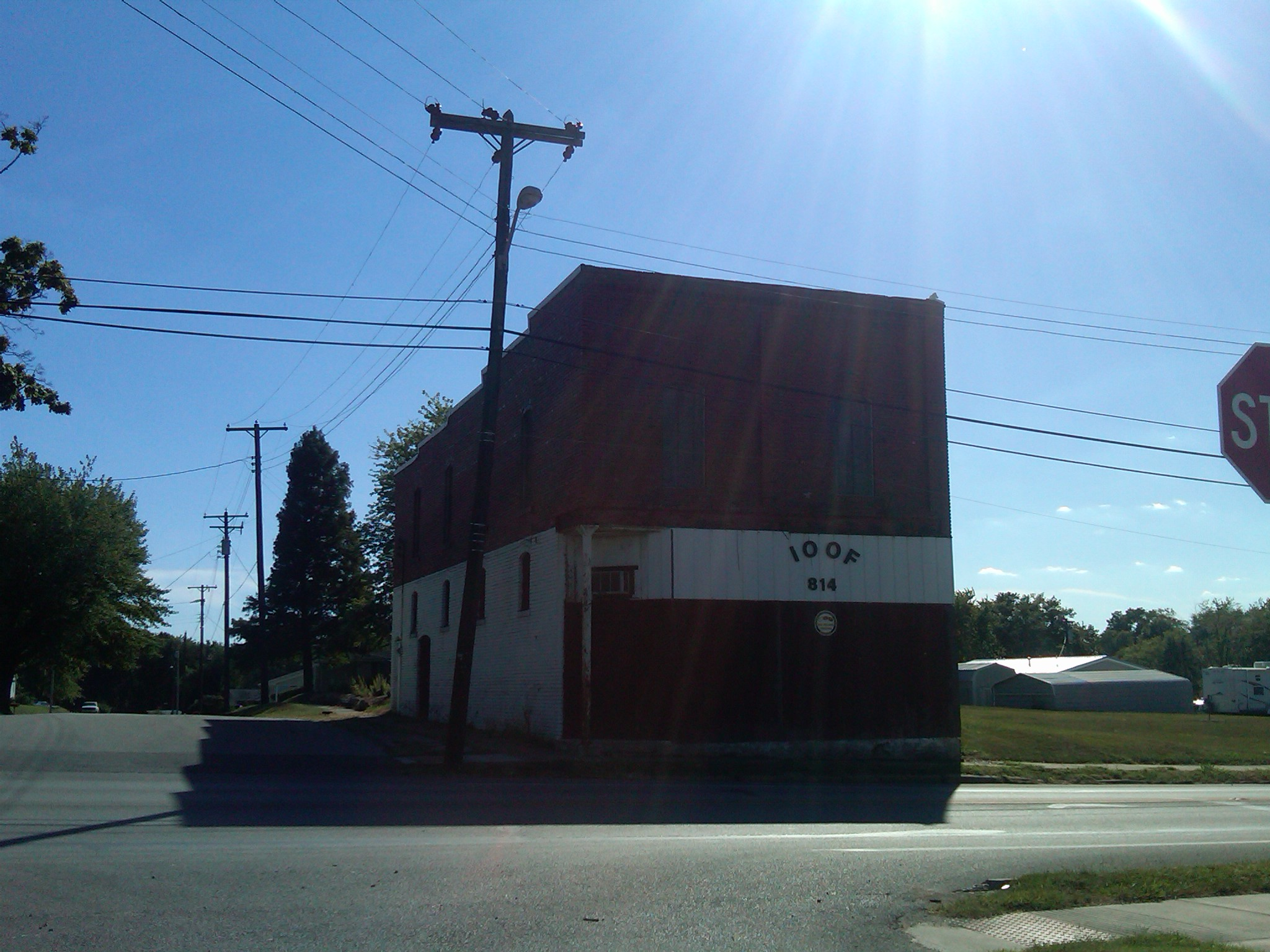
IOOF building Main & 4th st.

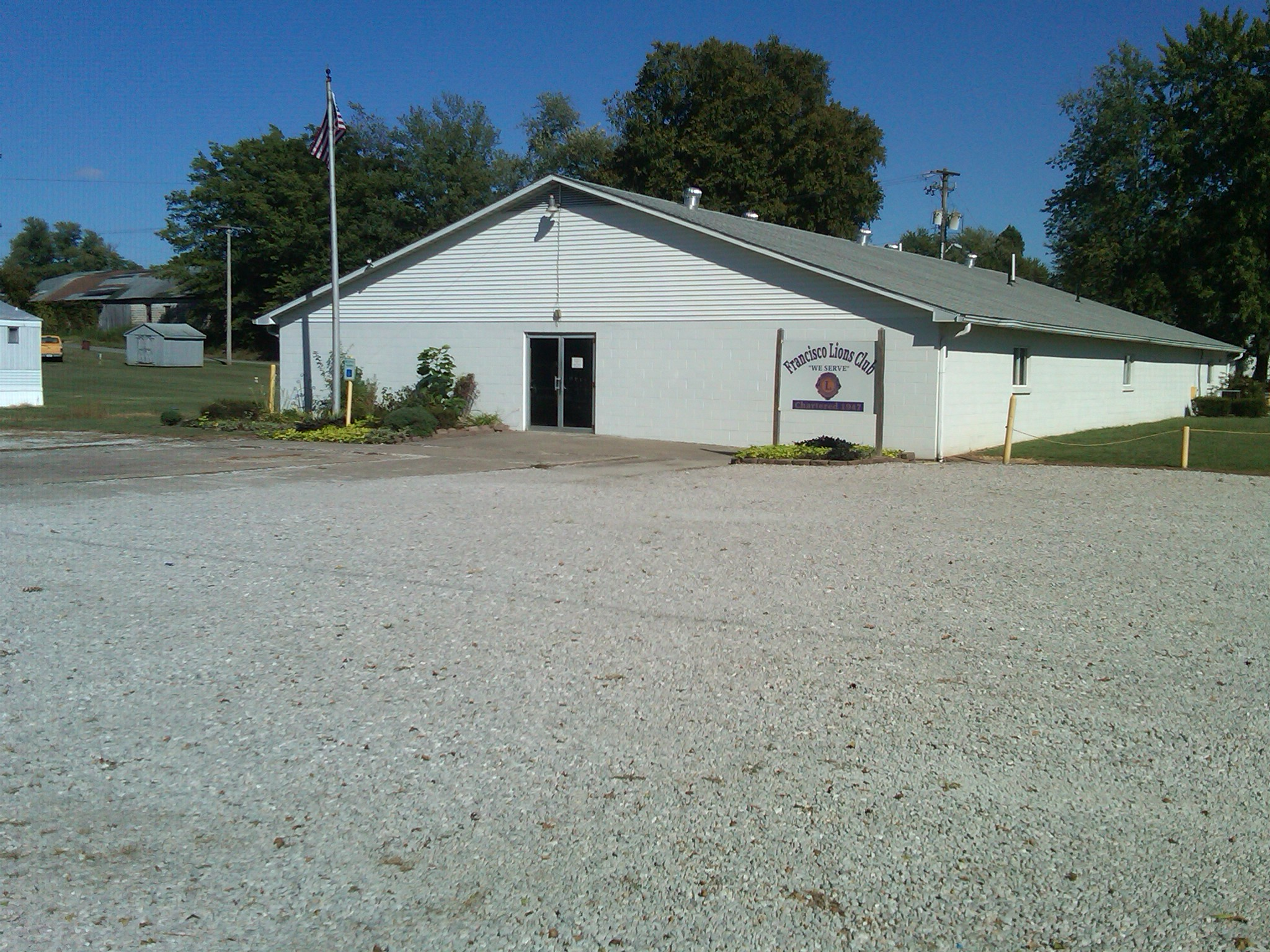
Lions Club Building on South 1st Street

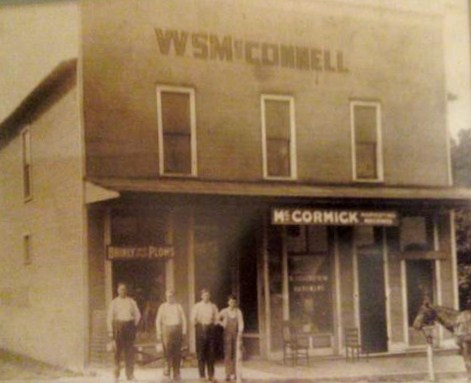
WS McConnell Building

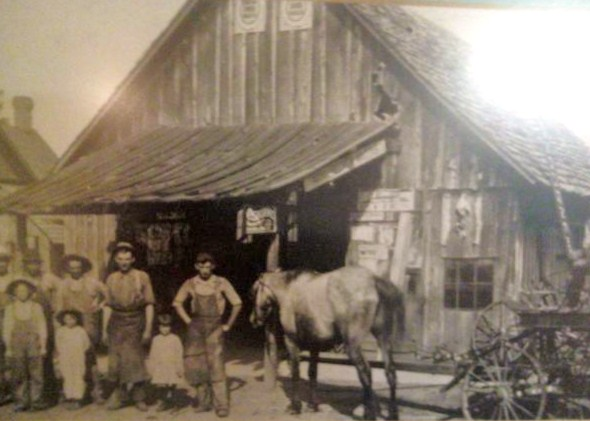
Blacksmith Shop still stands on South 3rd St.

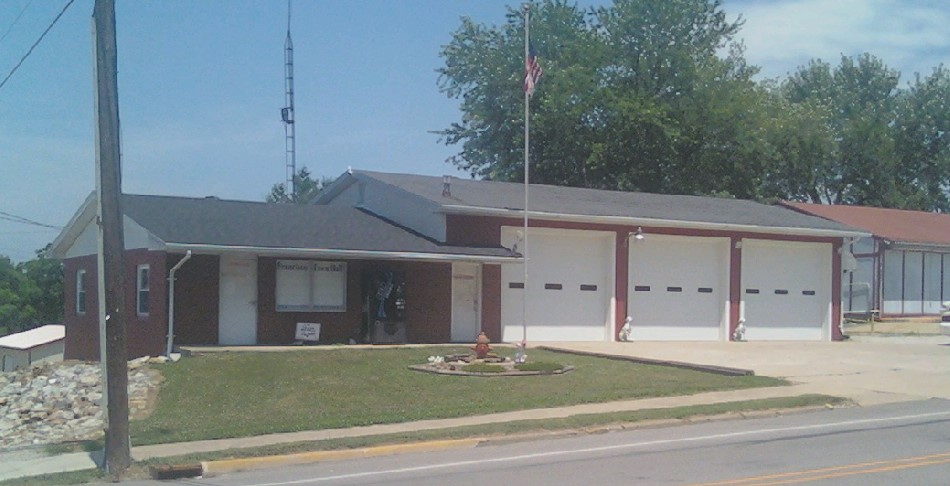
Fire Department prior to 2011 addition

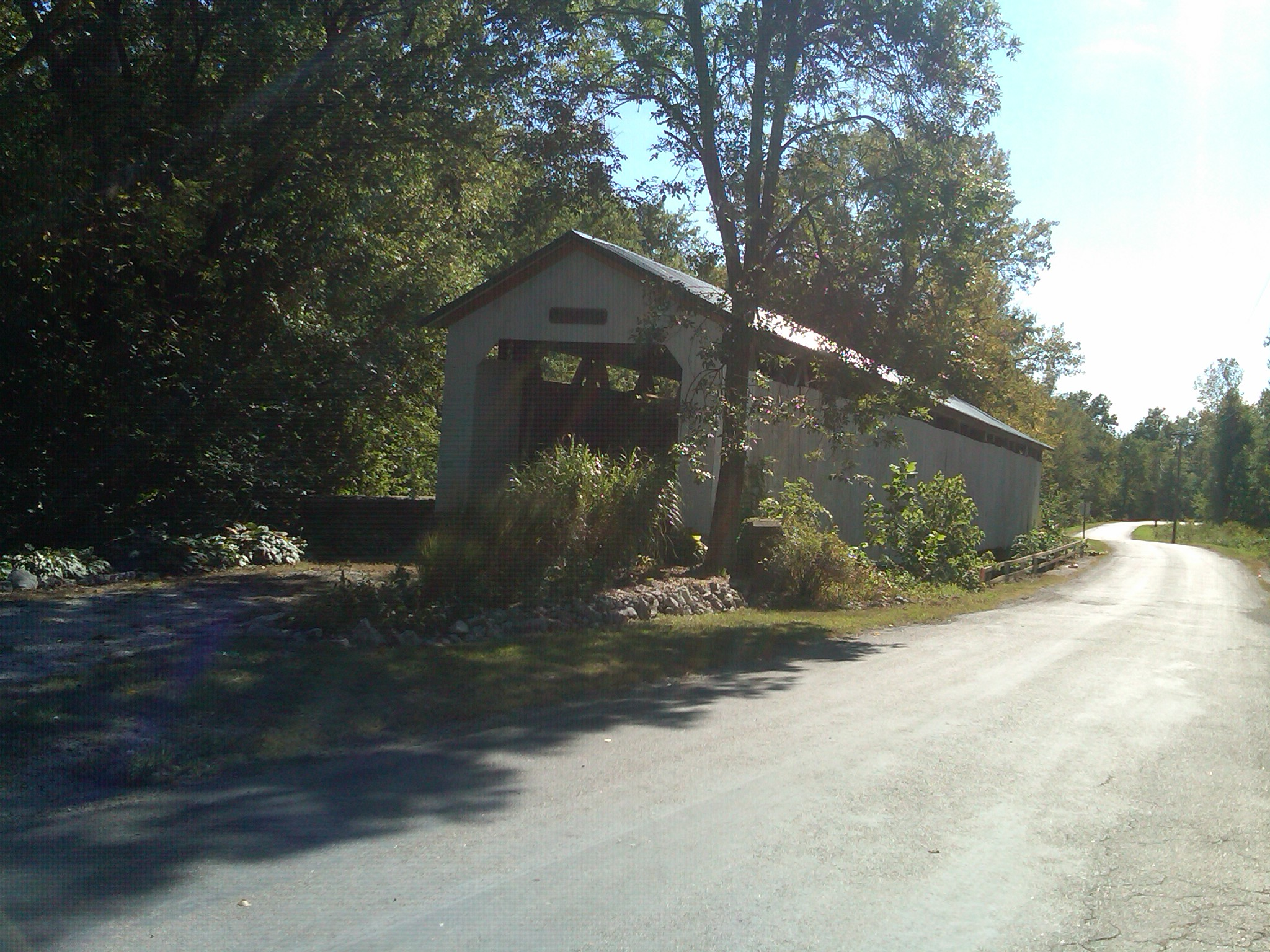
Covered bridge North of Francisco at Patoka River
