= Welborn-Ross House =

Historic house in Indiana, United States

- U.S. National Register of Historic Places
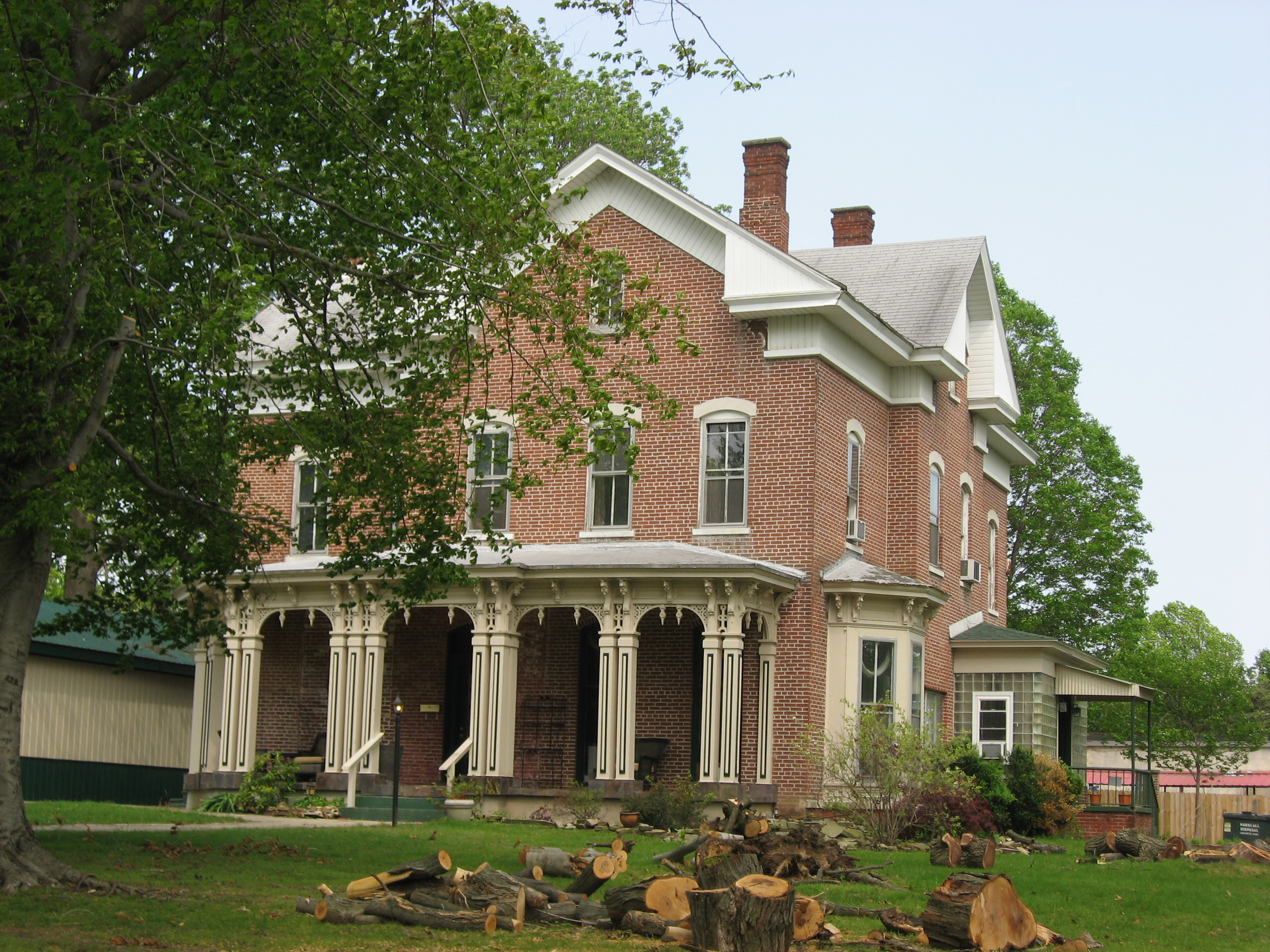
- Welborn-Ross House, April 2011

- Location within Indiana Location within the United States
- Location: 542 S. Hart St., Princeton, Indiana
- Coordinates: 38°21′1″N 87°34′45″W
- Area: less than one acre
- Built: 1875-1881
- Architectural style: Italianate
- NRHP reference No.: 96000287
- Added to NRHP: March 14, 1996

Welborn-Ross House is a historic home located at Princeton, Indiana. It was built between 1875 and 1881, and is a 2 1/2-story, Italianate style brick dwelling with a rear wing. It has an asymmetrical cross-plan and features an ornate one-story, full-width front porch. It was built by Dr. William P. Welborn, a prominent local physician.

It was listed on the National Register of Historic Places in 1978.
