= Johnson Township, Gibson County, Indiana =

Johnson Township Gibson County
- Township
- Location in Gibson County
- Coordinates: 38°11′40″N 87°34′31″W
- Country: United States
- State: Indiana
- County: Gibson
- Township Seat: Haubstadt
- School District: South Gibson School Corporation

Government
  - Type: Indiana township
  - Trustee: Edward Pruitt

Area
  - Total: 40.64 sq mi (105.3 km^{2})
  - Land: 40.53 sq mi (105.0 km^{2})
  - Water: 0.11 sq mi (0.28 km^{2})
- Elevation: 460 ft (140 m)

Population (2020)
  - Total: 4,467
  - Density: 110.2/sq mi (42.55/km^{2})
- Time zone: UTC-6 (CST)
  - Summer (DST): UTC-5 (CDT)
- ZIP code: 47639
- Area code: 812
- FIPS code: 18-38682
- GNIS feature ID: 453512
- Fastest Growing Township in the county in population

Johnson Township is one of ten townships in Gibson County, Indiana. As of the 2020 census, its population was 4,467 (up from 4,094 at 2010) and it contained 1,814 housing units.

Johnson Township was organized in 1823.

Historical population
Census	Pop.	Note	%±
1890	3,134		—
1900	1,866		−40.5%
1910	1,810		−3.0%
1920	1,740		−3.9%
1930	1,697		−2.5%
1940	1,812		6.8%
1950	1,890		4.3%
1960	2,263		19.7%
1970	2,649		17.1%
1980	2,882		8.8%
1990	3,099		7.5%
2000	3,462		11.7%
2010	4,094		18.3%
2020	4,467		9.1%
Source: US Decennial Census

== Geography ==
According to the 2010 census, the township has a total area of 40.64 square miles (105.3 km^{2}), of which 40.53 square miles (105.0 km^{2}) (or 99.73%) is land and 0.11 square miles (0.28 km^{2}) (or 0.27%) is water.

=== Cities and towns ===
- Haubstadt

=== Unincorporated towns ===
- Saint James
- Warrenton

=== Adjacent townships ===
- Gibson County
  - Union Township (north)
  - Barton Township (east)
  - Montgomery Township (northwest)
- Posey County
  - Smith Township (west)
- Vanderburgh County
  - Armstrong Township (southwest)
  - Scott Township (southeast)
- Warrick County
  - Greer Township (east)

=== Cemeteries ===
The township contains four cemeteries: Nobles, Powell, Stunkel, Tabor and Williams.

=== Major highways ===
- I-64
- I-69
- US 41
- SR 57
- SR 68

== Education ==
Johnson Township is served by the South Gibson School Corporation.

=== Public Schools ===
- Haubstadt Community School

=== Private Schools ===
- Saint James Catholic School - St. James
- Saints Peter and Paul Catholic School - Haubstadt
