= Leslie Irvin (serial killer) =

American serial killer (1924–1983)

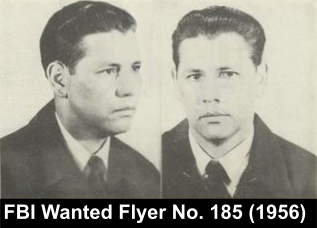
- Born: April 2, 1924; Evansville, Indiana, U.S.
- Died: November 9, 1983 (aged 59); Indiana State Prison, Michigan City, Indiana, U.S.
- Other names: "The Mad Dog Killer"
- Status: Deceased
- Conviction: First degree murder
- Penalty: Death; commuted to life imprisonment

Details
- Victims: 6+
- Span of crimes: 1954–1955
- Country: United States
- States: Indiana, Kentucky
- Date apprehended: April 8, 1955

Leslie "Mad Dog" Irvin (April 2, 1924 – November 9, 1983) was an American serial killer whose killing spree in the early 1950s terrorized residents of southwestern Indiana and whose Supreme Court case set a precedent for ensuring a fair trial for defendants even in the wake of a great deal of pretrial publicity.

== Crimes ==
Irvin was arrested in connection of killing 6 victims four separate incidents. This killing spree began December 2, 1954 and ended March 28, 1955. The crimes took place in Vanderburgh and Posey counties in Indiana and Henderson county in Kentucky. The victims were:

- December 2, 1954: Mary Holland, 33. Shot in head at close range at work. She was 3 months pregnant. Motive: Robbery.
- December 23, 1954: Wesley Kerr, 29. Shot in head at close range at work. Robbery.
- March 21, 1955: Wilhelmina Sailer, 47, Mt. Vernon, Indiana. Housewife, killed at home. Shot in head. Burglary.
- March 28, 1955: Goebel Duncan, 51. Henderson, Kentucky. Burglary.
  - Raymond Duncan, 29, Goebel's son.
  - Maple Elizabeth Duncan, 20, Dorris Ray's (Raymond's brother) wife.

In the last incident, Goebel's wife, Mamie, was shot, but survived, permanently blinded. Elizabeth had a two-year-old daughter who was spared.

In connection with the confession they claimed to have extracted from Irvin, the police claimed he admitted to two dozen burglaries and robberies. It turns out that Irvin had a criminal history. He had received a sentence of 10 to 20 years for armed robbery in Indianapolis in 1945, served 9 years, and moved to Evansville in May 1954.

== Capture ==
Irvin became a suspect after someone recalled seeing his car at the Duncan property slightly before the murders there. This led to his arrest. Later, weapons and some loot that tied him to one of the murders were found. He was captured the first time because his car was spotted on a rural road in Western Vanderburgh County. It was seen by Edward Peerman, Gary Peerman, Alan Peerman, Russell Peerman, Pete Molinet and Larry Weber.

The boys recognized a dent in the door of his car that had been reported in the paper. It had been parked on a lane off the road and the boys pulled in right behind him and yelled at him. They were just out having fun and were not sure it was Leslie Irvin at the time. The parents of the Peerman boys called the police and they verified that it was indeed Leslie Irvin the boys had seen on the road.

== Trials and appeal ==
After some wrangling between Kentucky and Indiana over which would try Irvin first, it was decided to begin with the trial for the Kerr murder.

Pretrial publicity was seen as a problem from the onset. Irvin's appointed attorney immediately moved for a change of venue from Vanderburgh County because of the difficulty of seating an impartial jury. The request was granted, but only to neighboring Gibson County. Ninety-five percent of the homes in Gibson County received newspapers with articles about the case, and the area was blanketed with radio and television reports. In the Supreme Court review, Justice Frankfurter made a special point "to attack the District Attorney's 'collaboration' with the media campaign" associated with the arrest and trial.

During the course of the voir dire examination, which lasted some four weeks, petitioner filed two more motions for a change of venue and eight motions for continuances. All were denied. Of the 430 potential jurors, 268 were excused for having fixed opinions about Irvin's guilt, 103 others were excused based on their opposition to capital punishment, and others were excused by the prosecution or defense or on hardship grounds. Of the twelve jurors finally selected, eight went into the trial believing Irvin was guilty.

During the trial, Irvin was led to courtroom on what resembled a chain dog leash. Because of that, and the brutality of the crimes, he was referred to in the news from then on as "Mad Dog." Furthermore, the prosecutor called him "Mad Dog" in his closing statement. He was found guilty of first degree murder for killing Wesley Kerr and sentenced to death.

Irvin escaped from the Gibson County jail in Princeton, Indiana on January 20, 1956. He did this by making keys with paperback novel covers, tin foil, and glue. He fled to the West. But on February 9, 1956, he was arrested in San Francisco while trying to pawn some rings taken in a Los Angeles burglary.

After several procedural steps, Irvin found himself before the United States Supreme Court on a 6th Amendment claim that he was not tried before an impartial jury because of extensive pretrial publicity. On June 5, 1961, it reversed his conviction. It was the first state conviction to be reversed mainly by prejudicial publicity.

- The constitutional claim arises in this way. Six murders were committed in the vicinity of Evansville, Indiana, two in December 1954, and four in March 1955. The crimes, extensively covered by news media in the locality, aroused great excitement and indignation throughout Vanderburgh County, where Evansville is located, and adjoining Gibson County, a rural county of approximately 30,000 inhabitants. The petitioner was arrested on April 8, 1955. Shortly thereafter, the Prosecutor of Vanderburgh County and Evansville police officials issued press releases, which were intensively publicized, stating that the petitioner had confessed to the six murders. The Vanderburgh County Grand Jury soon indicted the petitioner for the murder which resulted in his conviction. This was the murder of Whitney Wesley Kerr allegedly committed in Vanderburgh County on December 23, 1954. Counsel appointed to defend petitioner immediately sought a change of venue from Vanderburgh County, which was granted, but to adjoining Gibson County. Alleging that the widespread and inflammatory publicity had also highly prejudiced the inhabitants of Gibson County against the petitioner, counsel, on October 29, 1955, sought another change of venue, from Gibson County to a county sufficiently removed from the Evansville locality that a fair trial would not be prejudiced. The motion was denied, apparently because the pertinent Indiana statute allows only a single change of venue."

Irvin was retried and convicted on June 13, 1962, this time being sentenced to life in prison. His hobby in prison was hand-made leather work. He died at the Indiana State Prison in Michigan City on November 9, 1983, of lung cancer. His cellmate was James Michael Lineback Sr. (imprisoned for attempted manslaughter).

== See also ==
- Irvin v. Dowd

General:

- List of serial killers in the United States
