= Princeton Community High School =

Location
- 1101 North Main Street; Princeton, Gibson County, Indiana 47670; United States; 38°22′6″N 87°34′14″W

Information
- Type: Public high school
- Established: 1970
- School district: North Gibson School Corporation
- Superintendent: Brian Harmon
- Principal: Amy Stough
- Teaching staff: 46.00 (on a FTE basis)
- Grades: 9-12
- Enrollment: 600 (2023-2024)
- Student to teacher ratio: 13.04
- Colors: Red & White
- Fight song: On, Wisconsin
- Athletics: IHSAA: 3A (A for soccer)
- Athletics conference: Pocket Athletic Conference
- Nickname: Tigers / Lady Tigers
- Rivals: Gibson Southern; Wood Memorial; Mount Carmel
- Gym Capacity: 5,200
- Website: Princeton Community High School

Princeton Community High School is a four-year comprehensive secondary school in Princeton, Indiana, United States. The high school is a part of the North Gibson School Corporation. Until March 2016, the school operated a television station, W06BD, from studios at the high school. Princeton Community is the second largest of the three high schools serving Gibson County, Indiana. The others are Gibson Southern, which is larger, and Wood Memorial, which is smaller.

== History ==
Princeton Community High School was opened in the early 1970s to replace old Princeton High School, which became crowded due to the public school consolidations of the previous few decades.

A new High School opened in August 2012. Princeton Community Middle School is now located in the former Princeton Community High School resulting in a centralized Middle-High School Campus. And with the closure of Lowell South Elementary (Now Gibson County YMCA) in 2014, all grades K-12 are located in the same campus.

== Princeton's principals ==
- Amy Stough (2018–present)
- Steve Hauger (2014–2018)
- Jon Abbey (2002–2014)
- James E. Isaacs (1995–2002)
- Lawrence Ramsey (1970–1995)

== Athletics ==
Sports offered at PCHS are:

- boys' baseball
- boys' and girls' basketball
- cheerleading
- boys' and girls' cross country
- boys' football
- boys' and girls' golf
- boys' and girls' soccer
- girls' softball
- boys' and girls' tennis
- boys and girls' track
- girls' volleyball
- boys' wrestling

The boys' basketball team took the 3A state title in the 2008–2009 season.

The girls' basketball team also won the 3A state title in the 2014–2015 season.

== Notable people ==
- Gary Denbo - baseball coach and executive
- Jackie Young - American basketball player, chosen first for the 2019 WNBA Las Vegas Aces team

== See also ==
- List of high schools in Indiana
