= Princeton, Indiana =

- City
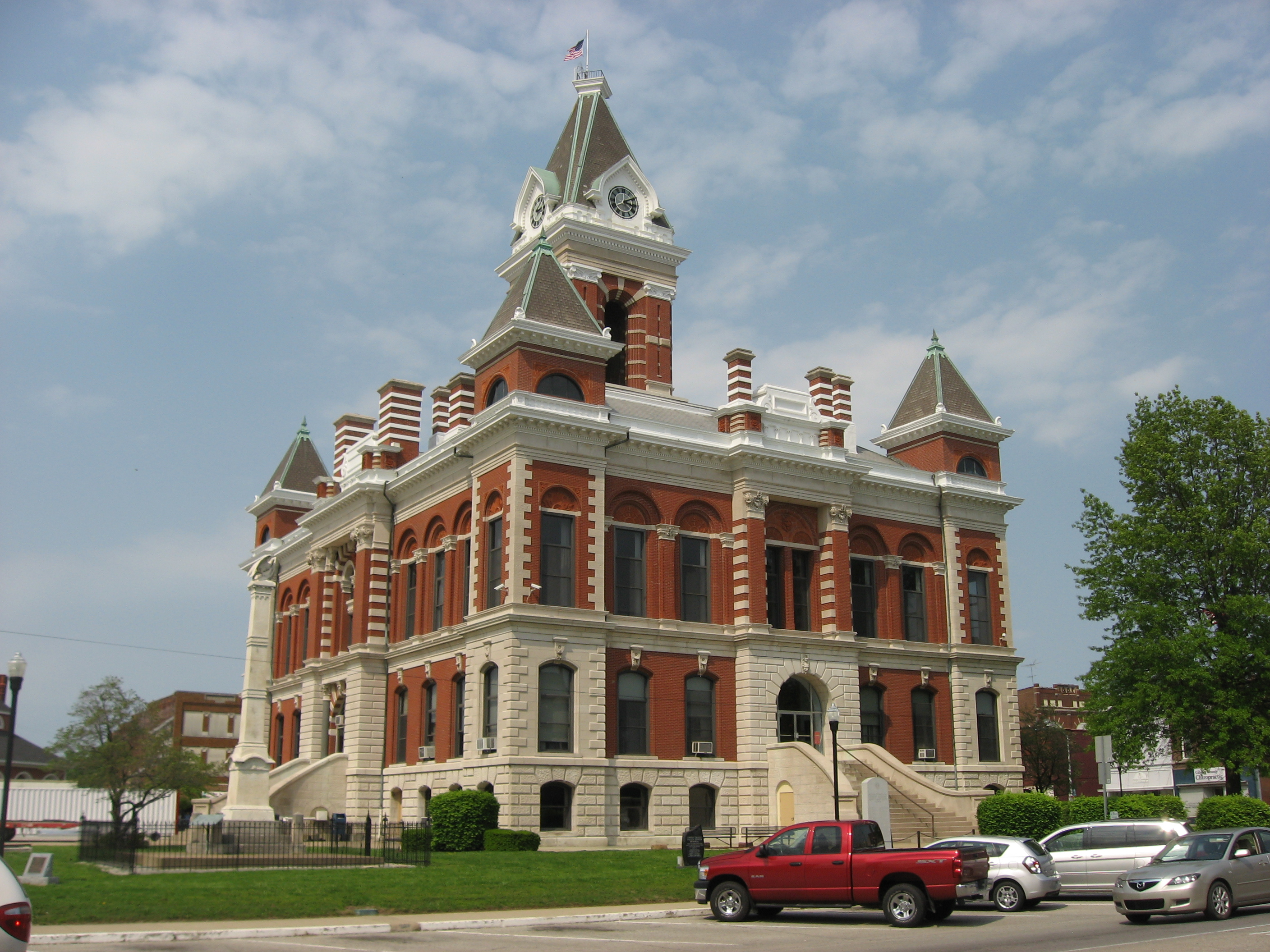
- Southern and western sides of Princeton's best-known landmark, the 1884 Gibson County Courthouse
- Nickname: The Heart of Southwestern Indiana
- Motto: "Creating A World Class Community"
- Location of Princeton in Gibson County, Indiana.
- Coordinates: 38°21′17″N 87°34′44″W
- Country: United States
- State: Indiana
- County: Gibson
- Township: Patoka
- Settled: 1814
- Named for: William Prince

Government
  - Mayor: Greg Wright

Area
  - Total: 5.48 sq mi (14.19 km^{2})
  - Land: 5.47 sq mi (14.18 km^{2})
  - Water: 0.0039 sq mi (0.01 km^{2}) 0.20%
- Elevation: 459 ft (140 m)

Population (2020)
  - Total: 8,301
  - Density: 1,516.2/sq mi (585.39/km^{2})
- Time zone: UTC−6 (CST)
  - Summer (DST): UTC−5 (CDT)
- ZIP Code: 47670
- Area code: 812
- FIPS code: 18-62046
- GNIS feature ID: 2396277
- Website: www.princeton.in.gov

Princeton is the largest city in and the county seat of Gibson County, Indiana, United States. The population was 8,301 at the 2020 United States census, and it is part of the greater Evansville, Indiana, Metropolitan Area.

== History ==
In 1800, the Indiana Territory was created with Vincennes (Knox County) as its capital. The rich farmlands in the southwest of the territory with access to the Ohio River attracted many pioneers and settlers to the area, one of whom was an Irish immigrant named William Prince. Born in 1772, he immigrated to America at the age of 22. He later became a Gibson County Commissioner and the county seat of Princeton is named after him.

The year 1813 saw the move of the territorial capital east from Vincennes to Corydon and the creation of Gibson County. Gibson had previously been part of the vast Knox County which covered all the land of southwestern Indiana, bordered by the Wabash and Ohio Rivers. By early 1814, settlers to this area were asking for a "seat of justice," or county seat. Captain William Prince was one of four commissioners who located the seat at the half-way stand on the Evansville and Vincennes stage line. By drawing of lots, commissioners decided to name the town after Captain Prince.

The iconic symbol of Princeton is the Gibson County Courthouse, a structure built in the Second Empire style. It has been featured as a collectible figurine by the Department 56 Original Snow Village. A post office was established in Princeton as early as 1816. The local newspaper, the Princeton Daily Clarion, was first published in 1846. Lyles Station, a small community just west of Princeton, was founded by freed Tennessee slave Joshua Lyles in 1849. It served as a haven for runaway slaves who braved the Ohio River on a northern trek towards freedom.

The Wabash and Erie Canal ran through the nearby towns of Francisco and Port Gibson, providing a means of reaching distant markets with goods from Princeton. The 1850s saw the advance of the railway system through Indiana, spelling doom for the canal system. The Evansville and Terre Haute Railroad line was run through town in 1852 and the Princeton Depot was constructed in 1875. The railroad became a boon to Princeton's industry as the Southern Railway Shops were constructed on the edge of town in 1892. Other industry included the Heinz plant (because of the area's famed tomatoes being good for ketchup making) and the Princeton Coal Mine.

In 1925, the Tri-State Tornado left its mark on the town. After hitting Griffin and narrowly missing Owensville to the southwest, the tornado devastated the southern side of Princeton, killing 45 people, injuring 150 and leaving hundreds homeless. Princeton was the historic storm's final victim, as the tornado dissipated about 10 miles to the northeast south of Oatsville. The deadliest tornado in US history claimed 95 lives in Indiana with almost half of those in Princeton.

On 9 December 1926, twenty-nine people were killed in a mine explosion in or near Princeton.

Toyota Motor Company opened a truck manufacturing plant between Princeton and Fort Branch in 1998 to build a new full-size pickup and SUV. Toyota significantly increased production at the plant in 2000. As of 2026, the plant builds three SUVs, including a Lexus model and a van.

On April 18, 2008, Princeton was shaken by the 2008 Illinois earthquake, epicentered approximately 18.5 miles (30 km) away near West Salem, Illinois.

The Gibson County Courthouse and Welborn-Ross House are listed on the National Register of Historic Places.

== Geography ==
According to the 2010 census, Princeton has a total area of 5.075 square miles (13.14 km^{2}), of which 5.07 square miles (13.13 km^{2}) (or 99.9%) is land and 0.005 square miles (0.01 km^{2}) (or 0.1%) is water.

=== Climate ===
The climate in this area is characterized by hot, humid summers and generally mild to cool winters. According to the Köppen climate classification system, Princeton has a humid subtropical climate, abbreviated "Cfa" on climate maps.

== Demographics ==
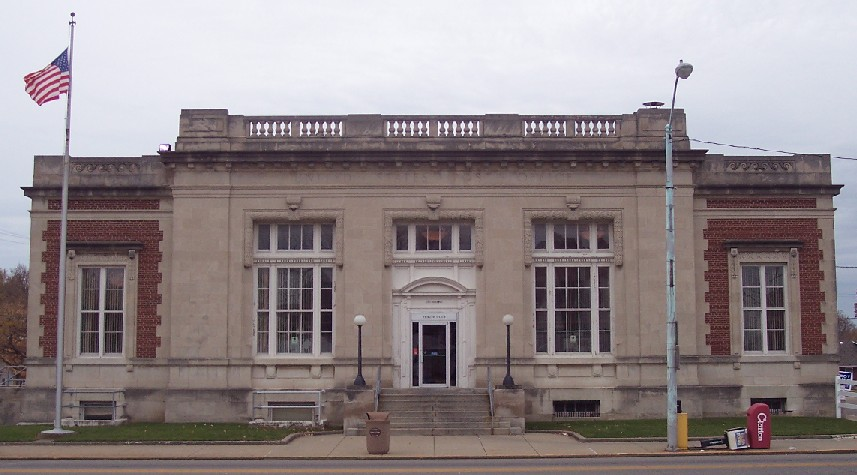
Princeton's Post Office, erected 1913

Historical population
Census	Pop.	Note	%±
1840	573		—
1850	806		40.7%
1860	1,397		73.3%
1870	1,847		32.2%
1880	2,566		38.9%
1890	3,076		19.9%
1900	6,041		96.4%
1910	6,448		6.7%
1920	7,132		10.6%
1930	7,505		5.2%
1940	7,786		3.7%
1950	7,673		−1.5%
1960	7,906		3.0%
1970	7,431		−6.0%
1980	8,976		20.8%
1990	8,127		−9.5%
2000	8,175		0.6%
2010	8,644		5.7%
2020	8,301		−4.0%
U.S. Decennial Census

=== 2020 census ===
As of the 2020 census, Princeton had a population of 8,301. The median age was 38.9 years. 23.3% of residents were under the age of 18 and 18.4% of residents were 65 years of age or older. For every 100 females there were 94.2 males, and for every 100 females age 18 and over there were 93.6 males age 18 and over.

98.7% of residents lived in urban areas, while 1.3% lived in rural areas.

There were 3,513 households in Princeton, of which 28.9% had children under the age of 18 living in them. Of all households, 37.1% were married-couple households, 22.4% were households with a male householder and no spouse or partner present, and 32.5% were households with a female householder and no spouse or partner present. About 34.9% of all households were made up of individuals and 14.4% had someone living alone who was 65 years of age or older.

There were 3,982 housing units, of which 11.8% were vacant. The homeowner vacancy rate was 2.2% and the rental vacancy rate was 8.2%.

Racial composition as of the 2020 census
Race	Number	Percent
White	7,136	86.0%
Black or African American	399	4.8%
American Indian and Alaska Native	9	0.1%
Asian	100	1.2%
Native Hawaiian and Other Pacific Islander	7	0.1%
Some other race	171	2.1%
Two or more races	479	5.8%
Hispanic or Latino (of any race)	277	3.3%

=== 2010 census ===
As of the census of 2010, there were 8,644 people, 3,516 households, and 2,129 families living in the city. The population density was 1,704.9 inhabitants per square mile (658.3/km^{2}). There were 3,976 housing units at an average density of 784.2 per square mile (302.8/km^{2}). The racial makeup of the city was 90.4% White, 4.6% African American, 0.2% Native American, 0.7% Asian, 1.1% from other races, and 3.0% from two or more races. Hispanic or Latino of any race were 2.5% of the population.

There were 3,516 households, of which 32.8% had children under the age of 18 living with them, 41.0% were married couples living together, 15.1% had a female householder with no husband present, 4.5% had a male householder with no wife present, and 39.4% were non-families. 33.8% of all households were made up of individuals, and 14.1% had someone living alone who was 65 years of age or older. The average household size was 2.34 and the average family size was 2.99.

The median age in the city was 37.2 years. 25% of residents were under the age of 18; 8.9% were between the ages of 18 and 24; 25.5% were from 25 to 44; 24.6% were from 45 to 64; and 16.1% were 65 years of age or older. The gender makeup of the city was 47.7% male and 52.3% female.

=== 2000 census ===
As of the census of 2000, there were 8,175 people, 3,451 households, and 2,146 families living in the city. The population density was 1,703.1 inhabitants per square mile (657.6/km^{2}). There were 3,806 housing units at an average density of 792.9 per square mile (306.1/km^{2}). The racial makeup of the city was 91.36% White, 5.36% African American, 0.17% Native American, 1.26% Asian, 0.01% Pacific Islander, 0.39% from other races, and 1.44% from two or more races. Hispanic or Latino of any race were 1.13% of the population.

There were 3,451 households, out of which 28.9% had children under the age of 18 living with them, 44.1% were married couples living together, 13.8% had a female householder with no husband present, and 37.8% were non-families. 33.0% of all households were made up of individuals, and 15.9% had someone living alone who was 65 years of age or older. The average household size was 2.28 and the average family size was 2.88.

In the city, the age distribution of the population shows 24.1% under the age of 18, 8.8% from 18 to 24, 27.4% from 25 to 44, 20.6% from 45 to 64, and 19.1% who were 65 years of age or older. The median age was 38 years. For every 100 females, there were 87.2 males. For every 100 females age 18 and over, there were 83.0 males.

The median income for a household in the city was $26,689, and the median income for a family was $37,308. Males had a median income of $28,076 versus $19,825 for females. The per capita income for the city was $15,049. About 15.0% of families and 15.8% of the population were below the poverty line, including 23.2% of those under age 18 and 11.2% of those age 65 or over.

== Economy ==
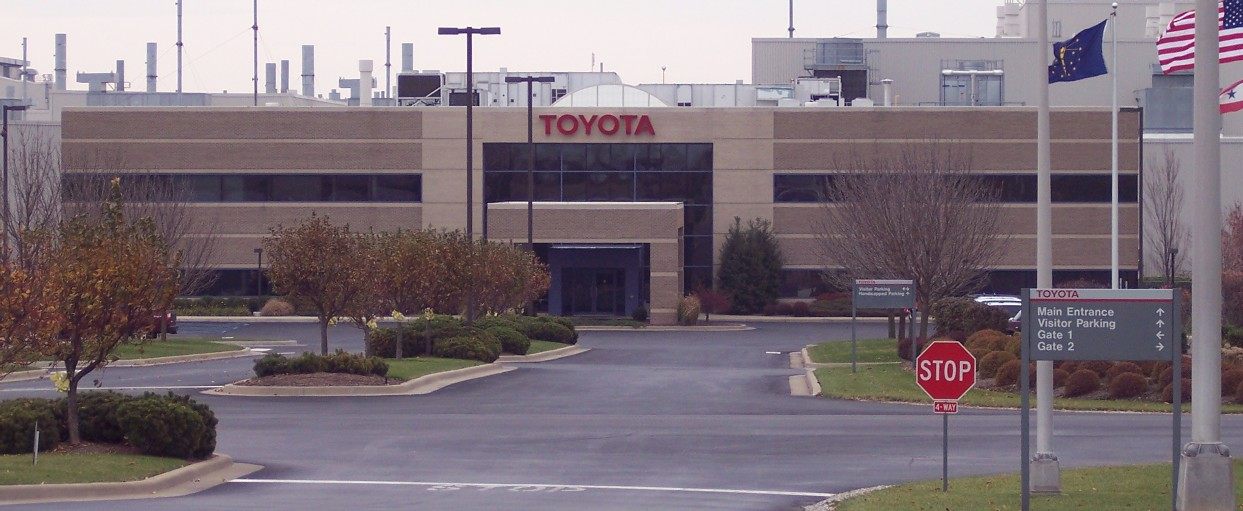
Toyota Motor Manufacturing Indiana is Princeton's largest employer

Major employers in Princeton include Toyota Motor Manufacturing Indiana (TMMI), located 3 miles to the south, nearly halfway between Princeton and Fort Branch, where the Toyota Sequoia, Sienna and Highlander are manufactured; and Hansen Corporation. Many Toyota suppliers have facilities between the plant site and the city. These suppliers include EnovaPremier, Vuteq, TBIN, Millennium Steel, DXE, SMC, Global SQ, and Trigo. All of these facilities were either built or converted from other uses to furnish supplies, part and services to TMMI. Siemens at one point had research and manufacturing facilities in Princeton, but the manufacturing plant was closed in the early 1990s and the research facility was closed soon after. A large hardware store currently occupies the former Siemens site.

Toyota's announcement in late 1995 that it would be building a $1 billion manufacturing facility in Princeton created an economic boom, as many of Toyota's suppliers also built plants in or near Princeton to minimize shipping and logistical expenses. Additionally, many service businesses located in town to satisfy the needs of the employees, many of whom would be relocating to the Princeton area from elsewhere. However, the arrival of Toyota was not without controversy. Many objected to the ten-year tax abatement offered as part of the incentive package to induce Toyota to locate in the area.

More recently, many retail and restaurant chains have opened locations in Princeton. Analysts attribute much of this to the planned extension of Interstate 69—at the time many of these businesses were sited in Princeton, the leading proposal for the project was to upgrade U.S. 41 (it was later decided to build Interstate 69 over a new-terrain route, which would travel between nearby Oakland City and Francisco).

Princeton is bisected by two freight rail lines: CSX and Norfolk Southern.

== Parks and recreation ==
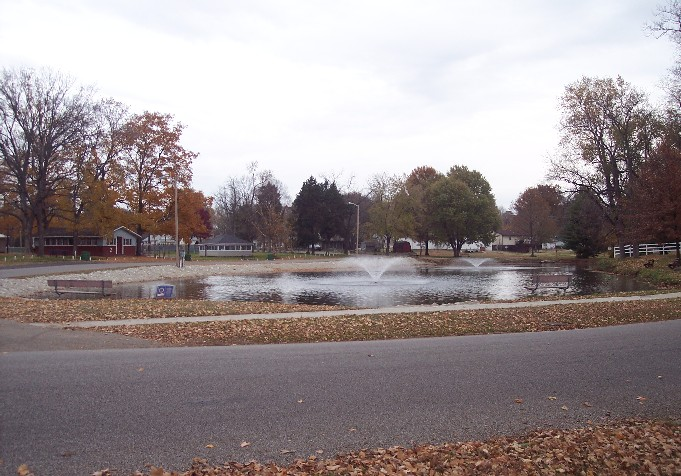
Lafayette Park

Princeton has three main city parks, administered by the Department of Parks and Recreation. Lafayette Park, on the city's north side, is the largest. It features a fishing pond, shelter houses, a playground, an open general-purpose recreation area, and a stage for public performances. The city swimming pool is adjacent to Lafayette Park, as is Kiddie Land, a playground for very young children. Gil Hodges field, where the Princeton Community High School baseball team plays its home games, is also located on the park property.

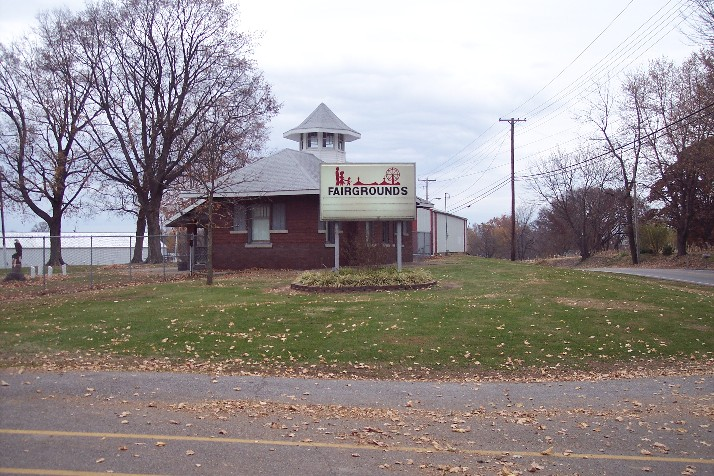
Gibson County Fairgrounds

The other two city parks are South Side Park and East End Park

== Government ==
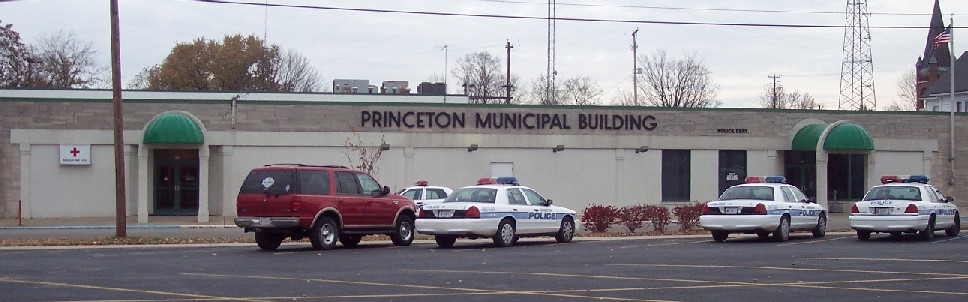
Princeton Municipal Building

Princeton is governed by a mayor and a five-member city council, all of whom are elected for four-year terms. The current mayor is Greg Wright, Republican as of January 1, 2020. City functions are divided among the Police Department, Sanitation Department, Parks and Recreation Department, Street Department, Sewer Department, Water Department, Water Treatment Plant, and the Princeton Fire Territory (formed from a merger between the Princeton Fire Department and the Patoka Township Fire Department in early 2006. They later split back up in 2025).

== Education ==
Residents are in North Gibson School Corporation. Schools in this school district include:

- Princeton Community High School
- Princeton Community Middle School
- Princeton Community Intermediate School
- Princeton Community Primary School

Prior to 1965, students were zoned to Princeton High School. That year, it became Princeton Community High School, a merger of three high schools.

Private schools:

- Bethel Christian School
- St. Joseph Catholic Elementary School (Roman Catholic Diocese of Evansville)

It was once the home of the Princeton Normal and Industrial University, a correspondence school for African American students in the early 19th-century.

The town has a lending library, the Princeton Public Library.

== Media ==
=== Radio ===
- FM 98.1 WRAY-FM – Country Music / Programs
- FM 94.3 WRAY – FM-based repeater for AM 1250
- AM 1250 WRAY – News / Talk / Programs

=== Newspapers ===
- Princeton Daily Clarion – Tue-Fri Circulation

== Infrastructure ==
Highways:

- U.S. Route 41 Evansville – Terre Haute
- State Road 64 Known as Broadway Avenue for its entire length in Princeton. Mount Carmel –.
- State Road 65 Known as Broadway Avenue for first two thirds of its length up to the Courthouse Square, then turns onto Main Street for the remaining third. Heads for Petersburg or Owensville via Indiana 64.

== Notable people ==
- Michael A. Banks – author, born in Princeton in 1951
- Gary Burton (born in Anderson, Indiana) – jazz vibraphonist
- Taylor Caniff – Internet personality
- Gary Denbo – Miami Marlins Vice President of Player Development and Scouting
- Allen J. Flannigan – Wisconsin State Assemblyman
- Gil Hodges – professional baseball player
- Agnes Kimball – soprano
- Jeron Criswell King – actor and alleged psychic
- David J. Lawson – pastor, played a key role establishing and developing Africa University.
- Dave Niehaus – Seattle Mariners play-by-play announcer
- Michael E. Pegram (born in Fort Knox, Kentucky) – thoroughbred owner
- John S. Poland, U.S. Army brigadier general
- William Prince (born in Ireland) – politician, town's namesake.
- Orville Redenbacher (born in Brazil, Indiana) – popcorn icon
- Jamie Rowe (rock- heavy metal vocalist)
- Dave Thomas (born in Atlantic City, New Jersey) – founder of Wendy's
- Mack V. Wright – actor and film director
- Jackie Young – American basketball player, chosen first for the 2019 WNBA Las Vegas Aces team

== Sister cities ==
- Tahara, Aichi, Japan since August 8, 2002
