= Gibson Southern High School =

Location
- 3499 W CR 800 S Fort Branch, Indiana 47648; United States; 38°14′11″N 87°38′07″W

Information
- Type: Public
- Established: August 1974
- School district: South Gibson School Corporation
- Principal: Jon Adams
- Teaching staff: 38.33 (FTE)
- Grades: 9-12
- Enrollment: 742 (2026-2027)
- Average class size: 22.9
- Student to teacher ratio: 20.11
- Color
- Fight song: "Gibson Southern" set to the melody of the Minnesota Rouser
- Athletics conference: Pocket Athletic Conference
- Team name: Titans
- Rival: Princeton Community; Wood Memorial; Evansville Memorial (Primarily in football and softball)
- Newspaper: The Southerner
- Website: gshs.sgibson.k12.in.us

Gibson Southern High School is a public high school located in Fort Branch, Indiana.

== Academics ==
Gibson Southern High School received the Indiana Four Star School Award for seven consecutive years.

== Athletics ==
In 1974, Gibson Southern was originally a member of the Pocket Athletic Conference (PAC). In 1980, the school left the PAC to form the Big 8 Conference with 7 former Southern Indiana Athletic Conference schools, some of which were also once members of the PAC. In 1994, Gibson Southern left the Big 8 to rejoin the PAC. In 2020 the Pocket Athletic Conference expanded with Boonville, Mount Vernon, Princeton and Washington joining Forest Park, Gibson Southern, Heritage Hills, North Posey, Pike Central, Southridge, South Spencer, Tecumseh, and Tell City to make it a 13-team conference.

The school won state championships in softball in 2003, 2005 in class AA and 2015 in AAA, splitting back to back appearances (2014 and 2015) with Leo, and as a result played in class AAAA in the sport from 2016 to 2021.

In 2021, the football team won their first state championship in school (and Gibson County) history, defeating Indianapolis Brebeuf.

In 2024, the girls basketball team won their first state title in school history, defeating Norwell. This comes 22 years after finishing runner up in 2002 to Fort Wayne Bishop Luers and with the win, Gibson Southern also became the last of the county's three high schools to win a state title in girls' basketball after Princeton in 2015 and Wood Memorial in 2017. But unlike the other two, the Lady Titans will now have to compete in AAAA in girls' basketball for the next two years, provided they do not continue to make deep runs into the tournament, like the softball team did. This was a result of the state title, coupled with back-to-back appearances at semi-state. Unfortunately, like the softball team 5 years earlier, the girls' basketball team also made it to the Semi-State in class AAAA, potentially derailing their return to AAA.

== See also ==
- List of high schools in Indiana
