= Patoka Valley Conference =

The Patoka Valley Conference was an athletic conference based in Southwest Indiana. Originally formed as the Dubois County Conference in 1917, the conference changed its name in 1959 as schools from outside the county joined. The conference contained schools from Daviess, Dubois, Pike, Spencer, and Warrick counties at some point in its existence. The conference had eleven members for the 1964–65 season, yet within less than a decade disbanded with four members remaining (and two of those schools closed within another two years). The consolidation of schools across Indiana was the primary reason for the drop in membership.

== Membership ==
School	Location	Mascot	Colors	County	Year Joined	Previous Conference	Year Left	Conference Joined
Birdseye	Birdseye	Yellow Jackets		19; Dubois	1917	Independents	1971	none (consolidated into Forest Park)
Cuzco	Cuzco	Bear Cubs		19; Dubois	1917	Independents	1948	none (consolidated into Dubois)
Dubois	Dubois	Jeeps		19; Dubois	1917	Independents	1972	Lost River
Ferdinand	Ferdianand	Crusaders		19; Dubois	1917	Independents	1971	none (consolidated into Forest Park)
Holland	Holland	Dutchmen		19; Dubois	1917	Independents	1972	none (consolidated into Southridge)
Huntingburg	Huntingburg	Happy Hunters		19; Dubois	1917	Independents	1942	Southern Indiana
Ireland	Ireland	Spuds		19; Dubois	1917	Independents	1970	none (consolidated into Jasper)
Jasper	Jasper	Wildcats		19; Dubois	1917	Independents	1953	Southern Indiana
Chrisney	Chrisney^{1}	Wildcats		74; Spencer	1959	Pocket/ Spencer County	1972	none (consolidated into Heritage Hills)
Lynnville^{2}	Lynnville	Lyndis		87; Warrick	1959	Pocket/ Warrick County	1965	none (consolidated into Tecumseh)
Otwell^{3}	Otwell	Millers		63; Pike	1959	Pike County	1972	Independents (consolidated into Pike Central in 1974)
Spurgeon^{3}	Spurgeon	Cardinals		63; Pike	1959	Pike County	1966	none (consolidated into Winslow)
Stendal^{3}	Stendal	Aces		63; Pike	1959	Pike County	1966	none (consolidated into Winslow)
Winslow	Winslow	Eskimos		63; Pike	1964	Pike County	1972	Independents (consolidated into Pike Central in 1974)
Barr-Reeve	Montgomery	Vikings		14; Daviess	1968	Daviess County	1969	Blue Chip
Forest Park	Ferdinand	Rangers		19; Dubois	1971	none (new school)	1972	Blue; Chip

1. Played concurrently in PVC and SCC 1959–65.
2. Played concurrently in PVC and WCC 1959–65.
3. Played concurrently in PCC and PVC 1959–64.
