= PAC All-Sports Titles =

The following lists are the winners of the Pocket Athletic Conference All-Sports Trophy. The trophy is determined by calculating fixed points for standings within the conference, then dropping the lowest score for schools that field teams for all conference-sponsored competitions (a team that does not field a sport would have that sport count as their dropped score. The trophy has been awarded since the 1969-70 school year in Boys' sports, and since 1977-78 for Girls' sports.

== Boys ==
Year Champion

- 1970 South Spencer
- 1971 Huntingburg
- 1972 Wood Memorial
- 1973 Fort Branch
- 1974 South Spencer
- 1975 Southridge
- 1976 Southridge
- 1977 Southridge
- 1978 Southridge
- 1979 Southridge
- 1980 Heritage Hills
- 1981 Heritage Hills
- 1982 Southridge
- 1983 Heritage Hills
- 1984 Heritage Hills

Year Champion

- 1985 Southridge
- 1986 Southridge
- 1987 Heritage Hills
- 1988 Heritage Hills
- 1989 Heritage Hills
- 1990 Southridge
- 1991 Pike Central
- 1992 Heritage Hills
- 1993 Heritage Hills
- 1994 Heritage Hills
- 1995 Pike Central
- 1996 Heritage Hills
- 1997 Heritage Hills
- 1998 Heritage Hills
- 1999 Heritage Hills

Year Champion

- 2000 Heritage Hills
- 2001 Gibson Southern
- 2002 Heritage Hills
- 2003 Heritage Hills
- 2004 Heritage Hills
- 2005 Heritage Hills
- 2006 Southridge
- 2007 Heritage Hills
- 2008 Heritage Hills
- 2009 Heritage Hills
- 2010 Heritage Hills
- 2011 Forest Park
- 2012 Gibson Southern/Heritage Hills
- 2013 Gibson Southern
- 2014 Gibson Southern

Year Champion

- 2015 Gibson Southern
- 2016 Gibson Southern
- 2017 Heritage Hills
- 2018 Heritage Hills
- 2019 Heritage Hills

== Girls ==
Year Champion

- 1978 Southridge
- 1979 Gibson Southern
- 1980 Gibson Southern
- 1981 Southridge
- 1982 Southridge
- 1983 Southridge
- 1984 Southridge
- 1985 Heritage Hills
- 1986 Heritage Hills
- 1987 Heritage Hills
- 1988 Southridge
- 1989 Southridge
- 1990 Pike Central

Year Champion

- 1991 Pike Central
- 1992 Pike Central
- 1993 Pike Central
- 1994 Heritage Hills
- 1995 Pike Central
- 1996 Heritage Hills
- 1997 Gibson Southern/Southridge
- 1998 Southridge
- 1999 Southridge
- 2000 Southridge
- 2001 Southridge
- 2002 Southridge
- 2003 Southridge

Year Champion

- 2004 Southridge
- 2005 Southridge
- 2006 Southridge
- 2007 Southridge
- 2008 Gibson Southern
- 2009 Gibson Southern
- 2010 Gibson Southern
- 2011 Southridge
- 2012 Gibson Southern
- 2013 Gibson Southern
- 2014 Gibson Southern
- 2015 Gibson Southern
- 2016 Gibson Southern

Year Champion

- 2017 Gibson Southern
- 2018 Gibson Southern
- 2019 Gibson Southern

== Sources ==
PAC History of Champions
