= Big Eight Conference (IHSAA) =

Athletic conference of IHSAA Class AAA high schools

- Founded: 1980
- Folded: 2020
- No. of teams: 6 when dissolved 8 at its height
- Region: 7 Counties: Daviess, Dubois, Gibson, Knox, Posey, and Warrick Counties, Indiana plus Wabash County, Illinois

Locations
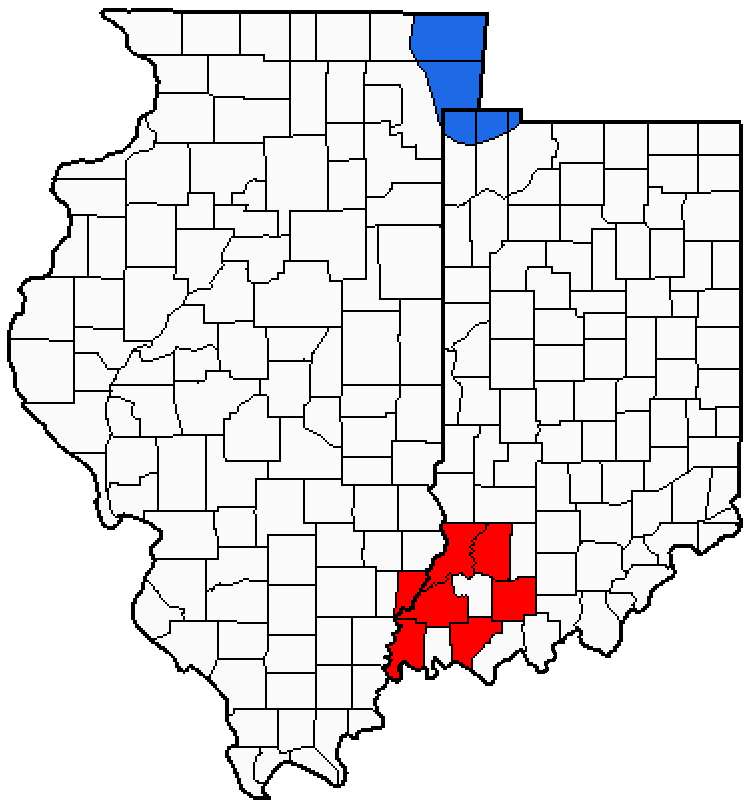
- Big Eight at its height with Mount Carmel included.

The Big Eight Conference was an athletic conference of IHSAA Class AAA high schools located in Southwestern Indiana. The conference members were small city-based schools located in Daviess, Dubois, Gibson, Knox, Posey, and Warrick counties in Indiana and once included Wabash County in Illinois.

== History ==
The Big Eight Conference was created in 1980 when seven members of the Southern Indiana Athletic Conference (Boonville, Jasper, Mount Vernon, Princeton, Tell City, Vincennes Lincoln, and Washington) left to form a new conference with a member of the Pocket Athletic Conference (Gibson Southern). Gibson Southern left in 1994 to rejoin the PAC. Tell City followed suit to rejoin the PAC in 2001 as well (they had both been in that conference before Tell City joining the SIAC in 1953 when it was a super conference), reducing membership to six schools. Mount Carmel joined in 2003 to increase the membership to seven. Mount Carmel, located in Illinois, was the only school from outside Indiana to compete in an Indiana athletic conference.

There have been two different members of the conference that captured the 3A boys' basketball title in four successive years. Very rarely has this occurred in the history of the state finals. Washington captured the 2007–08, 2009–10, and 2010–11 titles, and Princeton captured the 2008-09 State Title.

The conference's demise was set in motion by the Illinois High School Association member schools initially voting in December 2018 to establish a district football format (but repealing it one year later), meaning Mount Carmel would not be able to schedule all of the other conference members in that sport. The conference responded by voting to remove the school in 2020, while the school voted to leave before the 2019–20 school year. This set off a chain reaction, as Jasper and Vincennes Lincoln were accepted to return to the SIAC for 2020, and a week later, the PAC voted to accept the remaining four schools, including two former members, Boonville and Mount Vernon, effectively ending the conference. Its demise was further hastened by the 2020 Coronavirus Outbreak. Because of the outbreak, the conference's final spring season was canceled, and as a result, the conference ceased operations with the 2019-20 Winter Season.

== Member schools ==
=== Former members ===
School	Location	Mascot	Colors	County	Year joined	Previous conference	Year left	Conference joined
Boonville	Boonville	Pioneers		87; Warrick	1980	Southern Indiana	2020	Pocket
Gibson; Southern	Fort Branch	Titans		26; Gibson	1980	Pocket	1994	Pocket
Jasper	Jasper	Wildcats		19; Dubois	1980	Southern Indiana	2020	Southern Indiana
Mount; Carmel	Mount; Carmel	Golden; Aces		(IL); Wabash	2003	N. Egypt (Illinois)	2019	Little Illini (Illinois)
Mount; Vernon	Mount; Vernon	Wildcats		65; Posey	1980	Southern Indiana	2020	Pocket
Princeton; Community	Princeton	Tigers		26; Gibson	1980	Southern Indiana	2020	Pocket
Tell; City	Tell City	Marksmen		62; Perry	1980	Southern Indiana	2001	Pocket
Vincennes; Lincoln	Vincennes	Alices		42; Knox	1980	Southern Indiana	2020	Southern Indiana
Washington	Washington	Hatchets		14; Daviess	1980	Southern Indiana	2020	Pocket

== State championships ==
=== Boonville Pioneers (1) ===
- 2006 Softball (3A)

=== Jasper Wildcats (8) ===
- 1949 Boys' Basketball
- 1996 Baseball
- 1997 Baseball
- 1998 Baseball (3A)
- 1999 Boys' Tennis
- 2000 Baseball (3A)
- 2001 Football (4A)
- 2006 Baseball (3A)

=== Mount Carmel Golden Aces (3) ===
- 1927 Boys' Basketball (Illinois)
- 1981 Football (3A) (Illinois)
- 2010 Boys' Golf (1A) (Illinois)

=== Princeton Community Tigers (2) ===
- 2009 Boys' Basketball (3A)
- 2015 Girls' Basketball (3A)

=== Vincennes Lincoln Alices (3) ===
- 1923 Boys' Basketball
- 1981 Boys' Basketball
- 2002 Baseball (3A)

=== Washington Hatchets (9) ===
- 1914 Boys' Track
- 1915 Boys' Track
- 1930 Boys' Basketball
- 1941 Boys' Basketball
- 1942 Boys' Basketball
- 2005 Boys' Basketball (3A)
- 2008 Boys' Basketball (3A)
- 2010 Boys' Basketball (3A)
- 2011 Boys' Basketball (3A)

== Conference championships ==
=== Football ===
School	Championships	Years
Jasper	23	1981, 1982, 1984*, 1985, 1986*, 1987, 1990, 1994, 1995, 1996*, 1998, 1999*, 2000, 2001, 2004*, 2005, 2006*, 2008, 2009, 2010, 2012, 2014*, 2015
Vincennes Lincoln	10	1983*, 1984*, 1996*, 1997, 1999*, 2002, 2003, 2004*, 2014*, 2017
Tell City	6	1980, 1984*, 1988, 1989, 1991*, 1992
Mount Carmel	5	2006*, 2007, 2011, 2013, 2014*, 2016
Boonville	4	1984*, 1986*, 1991*, 2018
Gibson Southern	1	1983*
Princeton Community	1	1993
Mount Vernon	0	
Washington	0	

=== Boys basketball ===
School	Championships	Years
Vincennes Lincoln	21	1981, 1982*, 1984*, 1987, 1988, 1989*, 1990, 1991, 1992, 1994, 1997, 1998, 1999*, 2002, 2003*, 2004, 2006, 2012, 2013, 2015, 2016*
Jasper	10	1982*, 1989*, 1993, 1996, 1999*, 2000*, 2014*, 2016*, 2018, 2019*
Washington	10	1983, 1995, 2003*, 2005, 2007, 2008, 2011, 2016*, 2017, 2019*
Princeton Community	6	1984*, 1985, 2009, 2010, 2014*, 2019*
Boonville	4	1986, 1999*, 2000*, 2001
Mount Carmel	0	
Mount Vernon	0	
Tell City	0	
Gibson Southern	0	

=== Girls basketball ===
School	Championships	Years
Washington	10	1992, 1993, 1994, 1995, 1996, 1997, 1998*, 1999, 2001, 2003
Jasper	9	1982, 1983, 1988, 1991, 1998*, 2005, 2010*, 2012, 2019
Boonville	7	1981, 1984*, 1985, 1986, 1987, 2000, 2017*
Vincennes Lincoln	6	2002, 2004, 2006, 2009, 2017*, 2018
Mount Carmel	4	2007, 2008, 2011, 2013
Princeton Community	3	2014, 2015, 2016
Mount Vernon	2	1984, 2010*
Tell City	2	1989, 1990
Gibson Southern	0	

Note: Big Eight Conference championships were determined by a single round-robin among the active members. The Big Eight Conference did not break ties in the standings for championship purposes, instead co-championships were awarded.

== Neighboring Conferences ==
- Pocket Athletic Conference
- Southern Indiana Athletic Conference
- Blue Chip Conference
- Patoka Lake Conference
