= Pocket Athletic Conference =

School Athletic Conference in Indiana, US

- Founded: 1938
- No. of teams: 8 Class 3A, 4 Class 2A, and 1 Class A
- Region: 8 Counties: Daviess, Dubois, Gibson, Perry, Pike, Posey, Spencer, and Warrick, Indiana

Locations
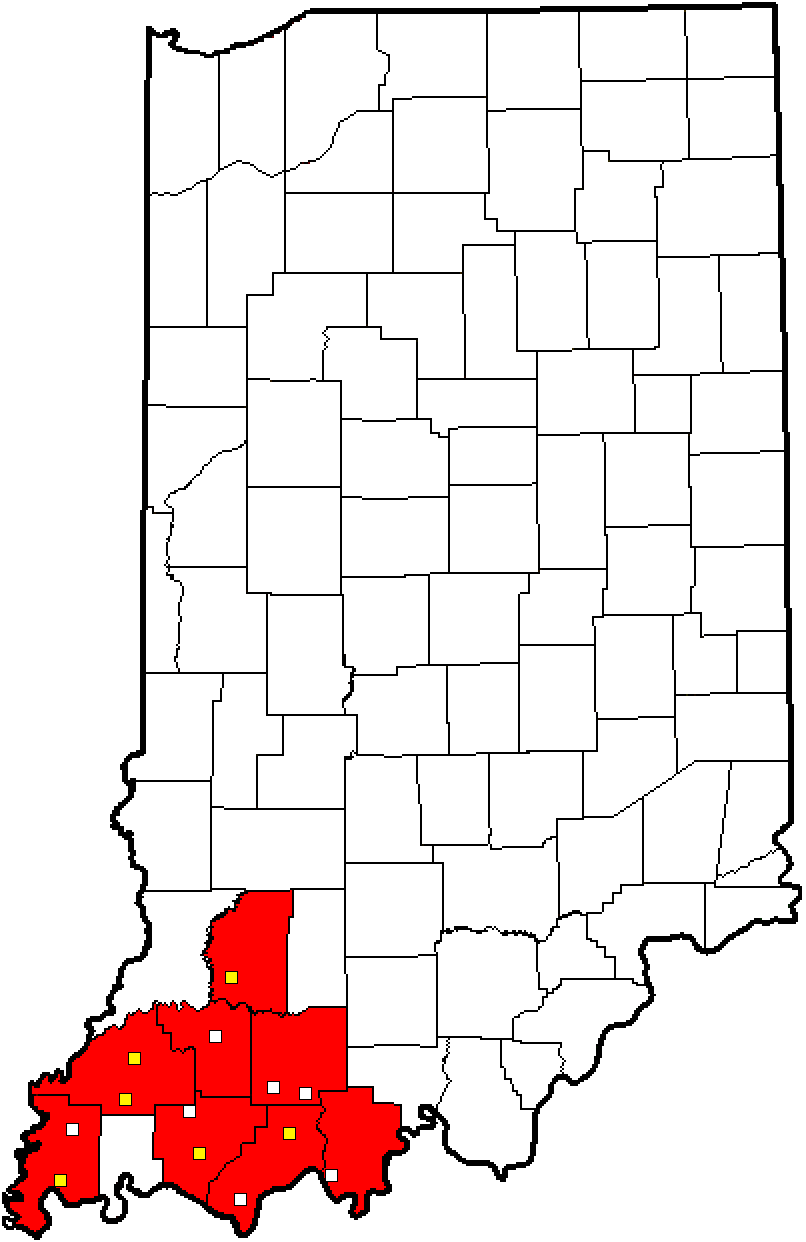
- PAC's now current configuration as of 2020–21 season. The Yellow Squares are Large School Division Members, The White Squares are the Small School Division members.

The Pocket Athletic Conference (PAC) is a high school athletic conference in Southwestern Indiana with its headquarters at Forest Park. It is the largest athletic conference in the state of Indiana with 13 member schools. The conference is composed primarily of Class 3A schools, with a few 2A and one 1A. Schools are currently located in Daviess, Dubois, Gibson, Perry, Pike, Posey, Spencer, and Warrick counties. All schools are members of the Indiana High School Athletic Association.

== History ==
The Pocket Athletic Conference was established in 1938 with nine founding schools: Cannelton, Chrisney, Lynnville, Mount Vernon, Owensville, Petersburg, Poseyville, Rockport, and Tell City. Seven of the nine original schools remain members in some form today. Cannelton left in 1971 and is now an independent. Mount Vernon left in 1959 to join the Southern Indiana Athletic Conference then a member of the Big Eight Conference before returning to the conference in 2020. With the exception of Washington and Pike Central, all members are located within counties along the western end of the Interstate 64 corridor within Indiana, but those two members are also both along the southern end of the Interstate 69 corridor within Indiana.

The first current member appeared in 1958 when Poseyville consolidated with Cynthiana, Griffin, and Wadesville to form North Posey. Rockport merged with Richland in 1965 to form South Spencer. Elberfeld merged with former member Lynnville in 1965 to form Tecumseh. Also in 1965, Oakland City and Francisco, both of which joined the PAC in 1939, joined to become Wood Memorial. Dale, which had joined in 1939, joined with another former member, Chrisney, to form Heritage Hills in 1972. Huntingburg joined the PAC in 1970 from the SIAC and in 1972 consolidated with Holland to become Southridge. In 1974, Owensville consolidated with Fort Branch and Haubstadt into Gibson Southern. Both Fort Branch and Owensville were members of the PAC at the time. Haubstadt was also briefly a member of the PAC. That same year Petersburg joined with Winslow, Otwell, and Stendal to form Pike Central.

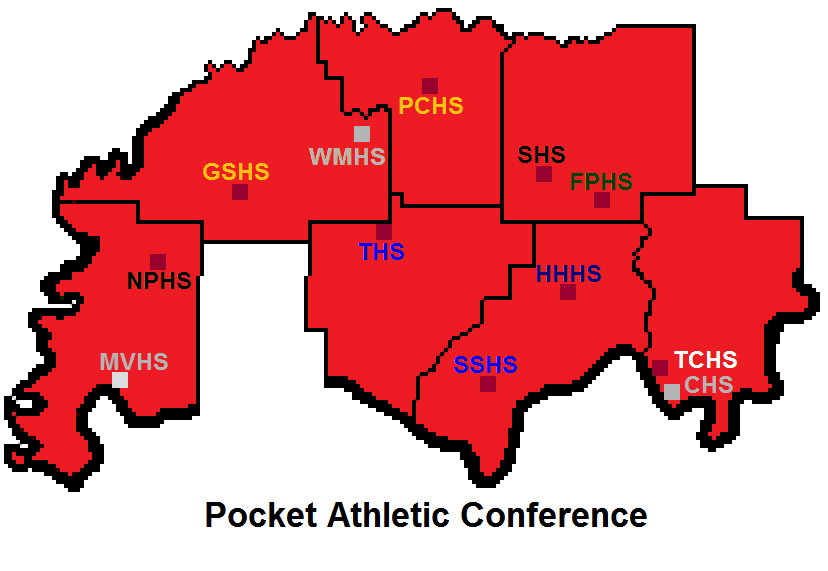
Approximate location of the PAC schools and former schools prior to 2020. Abbreviations are as follows: CHS: Cannelton FPHS: Forest Park GSHS: Gibson Southern HHHS:Heritage Hills MVHS Mount Vernon NPHS:North Posey PCHS: Pike Central SHS:Southridge SSHS: South Spencer THS: Tecumseh TCHS: Tell City WMHS: Wood Memorial

Gibson Southern left the PAC in 1979 when the Big Eight Conference was formed, only to return in 1994. In 2000, Wood Memorial left the PAC and is now a member of the Blue Chip Conference. Tell City, which had left in 1953, rejoined in 2001, also came back from the Big Eight Conference but also from the Southern Indiana Athletic Conference. In 2007, Forest Park, located in Ferdinand, officially joined the PAC from the Blue Chip Conference increasing the number of members back to the original nine.

The conference expanded to thirteen members in 2020, as they accepted former members Boonville and Mount Vernon, as well as Princeton, whose component school, Mount Olympus, was a member from 1939 to 1965, and complete newcomer Washington, all from the now extinct Big Eight Conference. In all, the PAC will inherit six of the original Big Eight members with the other two joining the SIAC.

== Football divisions ==
With 13 teams in the conference, it is not possible for all football teams to play one another (9-game season). Thus, the PAC is split into two divisions for football only.

| Large School | Small School |
|---|---|
| Boonville | Forest Park |
| Gibson Southern | North Posey |
| Heritage Hills | Pike Central |
| Mount Vernon | South Spencer |
| Princeton | Tecumseh |
| Southridge | Tell City |
| Washington | |

== PAC titles, since 2020 expansion ==
| School Year | Baseball | Basketball | Football-Lg | Football-Sm | Softball | Basketball-G | Volleyball |
|---|---|---|---|---|---|---|---|
| 2020/21 | North Posey | Heritage Hills | Gibson Southern | Southridge | GS / NP | Washington | Tecumseh |
| 2021/22 | Forest Park | South Spencer | Gibson Southern | North Posey | North Posey | Washington | Tecumseh |
| 2022/23 | Southridge | South Spencer | Gibson Southern | Southridge | North Posey | Forest Park | Tecumseh |
| 2023/24 | North Posey | HH/ Princeton | Gibson Southern | North Posey | Gibson Southern | Gibson Southern | Tecumseh |
| 2024/25 | North Posey/GS | Princeton | Heritage Hills | Southridge | Tecumseh | Washington | Tecumseh |
| 2025/26 | Gibson Southern | Boonville | Heritage Hills | North Posey | Tecumseh | Gibson Southern | Tecumseh |

=== Basketball ===
Forest Park, Southridge and Tecumseh have four state titles in both boys and girls basketball. Forest Park and Gibson Southern add three more state runner-up titles and a girls state title to the pool to make seven appearances at the state finals, not counting Tecumseh's appearance in the Tournament of Champions. Forest Park, Gibson Southern, North Posey, Southridge, and Tecumseh have all been ranked within the last eight years in either girls or boys basketball, sometimes both. In 1999, Tecumseh lost by six points in the experimental "Tournament of Champions" to the 4A State Champion, Indianapolis' North Central. Tecumseh was the 1A State Champion. Boonville and Washington bring additional strength on the conference's basketball schedule as well as two more of the state's largest gymnasiums. Starting in 2024, Gibson Southern will compete in AAAA in girls' basketball due repeated appearances in semi-state and now a state title in AAA.

=== Baseball and softball ===
The Pocket Athletic Conference has been exceptionally strong in baseball and softball in the last 20 years. Tecumseh softball has 7 state championships including consecutive 2A championships in 2025 and 2026. North Posey softball won the 2A state title in 2023, South Spencer and Gibson Southern won the softball state title in their respective classes in 2015. Forest Park softball also won the 1A title in 2001. North Posey ('05, '06) and South Spencer ('07, '13, '15) have won state titles in baseball.

=== Football ===
The Pocket Athletic Conference has a long history of being a periodic powerhouse in football with several members having state titles or runner-ups. Since 2000, the PAC has been represented in the football state finals ten times. The three schools that have represented the PAC recently are Heritage Hills (2000 and 2024 3A State Champs, and 2004 and 2023 3A Runner-up), Southridge (2002 and 2006 2A Runner-up and again in 2018 and 2019) and North Posey (2005 and 2023 2A Runner-up) and Gibson Southern (2021 State Champs). Heritage Hills was the dominant force in the conference, winning the conference from 1996 to 2008 and winning the AAA state title in 2000 but have three runner up titles as well. Southridge added a title in AA in 2017 while Gibson Southern added another AAA title in 2021, but Southridge adds a total of 3 more runner up titles in AA while North Posey adds another pair, all within the last 25 years. The oldest state appearance as a member belongs to South Spencer, occurring in 1986. Tell City, while having an appearance just two years earlier, was a member of the Big Eight Conference at the time, before its return. Both were runner-ups and both were in AA. Pocket members Gibson Southern, Heritage Hills, Forest Park, North Posey, and Southridge have either periodically or regularly ranked in the top ten in the last 10 years and the conference title has been considerably less predictable in the last ten years, even with the divisions.

In the last ten years, 32 Pocket Athletic Conference teams have represented their school and the conference in state championship games.

== Member schools ==
=== Current members (13) ===
| School School Corp. | Mascot | Colors | Location | County | Gym Size | Enrollment | Division | Other Sports | Football | Soccer | Softball^{4} | Baseball^{4} | Girls' Basketball^{4} | Year Joined | Previous Conference |
|---|---|---|---|---|---|---|---|---|---|---|---|---|---|---|---|
| Boonville; Warrick County | Pioneers | | Boonville | 87; Warrick | 5,650 | 891 | Large | AAA | AAAA | AA | AAA | AAA | AAA | 1939 ^{3} 2020 | Big Eight; SIAC; PAC |
| Forest; Park; Southeast Dubois | Rangers | | Ferdinand | 19; Dubois | 3,500 | 353 | Small | AA | AA | A | AA | AA | AA | 2007 | Blue; Chip |
| Gibson; Southern; South Gibson | Titans | | Fort; Branch | 26; Gibson | 3,870 | 798 | Large | AAA | AAA | A | AAA | AAA | AAA ^{7} | 1974 ^{1} 1994 | new school Big Eight |
| Heritage; Hills; N. Spencer | Patriots | | Lincoln; City | 74; Spencer | 2,800 | 617 | Large | AAA | AAAA | AAA | AAA | AAA | AAA | 1972 | none (new school) |
| Mount; Vernon; MSD Mount Vernon | Wildcats | | Mount; Vernon | 65; Posey | 3,200 | 586 | Large | AAA | AAA | AA | AAA | AAA | AAA | 1938 ^{3} 2020 | Big Eight; SIAC; PAC |
| North; Posey; MSD North Posey | Vikings | | Poseyville | 65; Posey | 2,000 | 499 | Small | AA | AA | A | AA | AA | AA | 1958 | none (new school) |
| Pike; Central; Pike County | Chargers | | Petersburg | 63; Pike | 3,200 | 415 | Small | AAA | AAA | A | AAA | AAA | AAA | 1974 | none (new school) |
| Princeton; Community; North Gibson | Tigers | | Princeton | 26; Gibson | 3,210 | 531 | Large | AAA | AAA | AAA | AAA | AAA | AAA | 2020 | Big Eight; SIAC |
| Southridge; Southwest; Dubois | Raiders | | Huntingburg | 19; Dubois | 6,092 | 541 | Small | AAA | AAA | A | AA | AA | AA | 1972 | none (new school) |
| South; Spencer; S. Spencer | Rebels | | Rockport | 74; Spencer | 3,500 | 345 | Small | AA | AA | A | AA | AAA ^{5} | AA | 1965 | none (new school) |
| Tecumseh; Warrick; County | Braves | | Lynnville | 87; Warrick | 2,600 | 304 | Small | AA | A^{2} | AA | AAA ^{6} | A | AA | 1965 | none (new school) |
| Tell City^{3} Tell City / Troy Twp. | Marksmen | | Tell; City | 62; Perry | 3,487 | 423 | Small | AA | AA | A | AA | AA | AA | 1938; 2001 | Independents; SIAC; Big Eight |
| Washington; Washington Community | Hatchets | | Washington | 14; Daviess | 7,090 | 741 | Large | AAA | AAA | AA | AAA | AAA | AAA | 2020 | Big Eight; SIAC |

Bold Class indicates a sport in which the school is either currently or has competed in a higher class.

1. Gibson Southern competed in the Big Eight Conference from 1980 to 1994 before rejoining the PAC.
2. Tecumseh is a 1A independent school in football.
3. Tell City played in the Southern Indiana Athletic Conference from 1953 to 1980, then played in the Big Eight Conference 1980–2001 before rejoining.
  Boonville and Mount Vernon were also earlier members who left to join the Southern Indiana Athletic Conference. They were joined with Gibson Southern and Tell City to form the Big Eight Conference but returned in 2020 after the breakup of the conference.
4. Sports in which a member is currently competing in a class above their enrollment due to the IHSAA's Tournament Success Factor.
5. South Spencer advances to AAA for 2 years in Baseball also because of the IHSAA's Tournament Success Factor.
6. Tecumseh advanced to AA due to the IHSAA's Tournament Success Factor. Due to the school winning consecutive State titles in AA, will now compete in Class AAA for next two years.
7. In 2025, Gibson Southern will compete in AAAA for the next two years after two consecutive seasons at semi-state and a state championship in AAA. Returned to AAA IN 2026–27.
- Shaded schools operate on Eastern Time. The rest operate on Central Time.

=== Former members ===
| School School Corp. | Mascot | Colors | Location | County | Year Joined | Previous Conference | Year Left | Conference Joined |
|---|---|---|---|---|---|---|---|---|
| Cannelton^{1} Cannelton Comm. Schools | Bulldogs | | Cannelton | 62; Perry | 1938 | Perry County | 1971 | Southern Roads (BRC 1974) |
| Chrisney^{2} North Spencer | Wildcats | | Chrisney | 74; Spencer | 1938 | Spencer County | 1959 | Patoka Valley |
| Lynnville^{3} Warrick County | Lyndis | | Lynnville | 87; Warrick | 1938 | Warrick County | 1959 | Patoka Valley |
| Owensville^{5} South Gibson | Kickapoos | | Owensville | 26; Gibson | 1938 | Gibson County | 1974 | none (consolidated into Gibson Southern) |
| Petersburg^{6} Pike County | Indians | | Petersburg | 63; Pike | 1938 | Pike County | 1974 | none (consolidated into Pike Central) |
| Poseyville^{4} M.S.D. North Posey | Posies | | Poseyville | 65; Posey | 1938 | Posey County | 1958 | none (consolidated into North Posey) |
| Rockport^{2} South Spencer | Zebras | | Rockport | 74; Spencer | 1938 | Spencer County | 1965 | none (consolidated into South Spencer) |
| Dale^{2} North Spencer | Golden Aces | | Dale | 74; Spencer | 1939 | Spencer County | 1972 | none (consolidated into Heritage Hills) |
| Fort Branch^{5} South Gibson | Twigs | | Fort Branch | 26; Gibson | 1939 | Gibson County | 1974 | none (consolidated into Gibson Southern) |
| Francisco^{5} East Gibson | Owls | | Francisco | 26; Gibson | 1939 | Gibson County | 1965 | none (consolidated into Wood Memorial) |
| Mount Olympus^{5} North Gibson | Mountaineers | | Mount Olympus | 26; Gibson | 1939 | Gibson County | 1965 | none (consolidated into Princeton) |
| Oakland City^{5} East Gibson | Acorns | | Oakland City | 26; Gibson | 1939 | Gibson County | 1965 | none (consolidated into Wood Memorial) |
| Winslow^{6} Pike County | Eskimos | | Winslow | 63; Pike | 1939 | Pike County | 1940 | Pike County |
| Wood Memorial; East Gibson | Trojans | | Oakland; City | 26; Gibson | 1965 | none (new school) | 2000 | Blue Chip |
| Huntingburg; Southwest Dubois | Happy Hunters | | Huntingburg | 19; Dubois | 1970 | Southern Indiana | 1972 | none (consolidated into Southridge) |
| Haubstadt; South Gibson | Elites | | Haubstadt | 26; Gibson | 1972 | Independents (GCC 1965) | 1974 | none (consolidated into Gibson Southern) |

1. Concurrent with Perry CC 1938–62.
2. Concurrent with Spencer CC: Chrisney 1938–59; Rockport 1938–65; Dale 1939–65.
3. Concurrent with Warrick CC: Tecumseh 1938–59; Boonville 1939–41.
4. Concurrent with Posey CC: Mount Vernon 1938–49; Poseyville 1938–58.
5. Concurrent with Gibson CC: Owensville 1938–49; Fort Branch, Francisco, Mount Olympus, Oakland City 1939–49.
6. Concurrent with Pike CC Petersburg 1938–49; Winslow 1939–40
- Schools that operate on Eastern Time.
1. As of 2012–13, Princeton plays in a new 5,200 seat gym which replaced the aging 3,000 seat old gym which was demolished in 2024.

== Sponsored sports ==
| Boys | State Titles | Runner-up | Regional | Sectional | Girls | State Titles | Runner-up | Regional | Sectional |
|---|---|---|---|---|---|---|---|---|---|
| Archery | 0 | 0 | 0 | 0 | Archery | 0 | 0 | 0 | 0 |
| Basketball | 3 | 3 | 18 | 119 | Softball | 4 | 6 | 13 | 39 |
| Baseball | 6 | 1 | 20 | 69 | Basketball | 1 | 2 | 11 | 50 |
| Football ^{1} ^{2} | 2 | 7 | 26 | 36 | Cross Country | 0 | 0 | | |
| Cross Country | 0 | 0 | 7 | 25 | Golf | 0 | 0 | | |
| Golf | 0 | 0 | 0 | 4 | Soccer | 0 | 1 | 1 | 7 |
| Soccer | 0 | 0 | 0 | 3 | Swimming | 0 | 0 | No Regional | |
| Swimming | 0 | 0 | No Regional | 3 | Tennis | 0 | 0 | | |
| Tennis | 0 | 0 | 1 | 16 | Track & Field | 0 | 0 | | |
| Track & Field | 0 | 0 | 0 | 18 | Volleyball | 0 | 0 | | |
| Wrestling | 0 | 0 | 0 | 14 | Wrestling | 0 | 0 | 0 | 0 |
| Total | 10 | 10 | 71 | 307 | Total | 4 | 8 | 25 | 96 |
| Conference; Total | 14 | 17 | 96 | 403 | | | | | |

^{1}From 2008 to 2022 Tecumseh played football as an independent but is now participating in PAC for all sports.

^{2}2 State Titles, however Tell City's football title was won under the Big Eight Conference.

- Sectional and Regional numbers include titles won by the nine schools' predecessors, but do not include those who left, i.e. Cannelton, Mount Vernon, and Wood Memorial or their predecessors.

== State championships (43) ==
Boonville Pioneers (2)

- 2006 Softball (3A) ^{2}
- 2021 Softball (3A)

Forest Park Rangers (5)

- 2001 Softball (A) ^{1}
- 2005 Boys Basketball (2A) ^{1}
- 2006 Boys Basketball (2A) ^{1}
- 2022 Girls Basketball (2A)
- 2023 Girls Basketball (2A)

Gibson Southern Titans (5)

- 2003 Softball (2A)
- 2005 Softball (3A)
- 2015 Softball (3A)
- 2021 Football (3A)
- 2024 Girls Basketball (3A)

Heritage Hills Patriots (2)

- 1996 Girls Tennis, Singles
- 2000 Football (3A)
- 2024 Football (3A)

Mount Vernon Wildcats (0)

North Posey Vikings (3)

- 2005 Baseball (2A)
- 2006 Baseball (2A)
- 2023 Softball (2A)

Pike Central Chargers (0)

Princeton Community Tigers (2)

- 2009 Boys' Basketball (3A) ^{2}
- 2015 Girls' Basketball (3A) ^{2}

Southridge Raiders (3)

- 1998 Girls Basketball (2A)
- 2017 Football (2A)
- 2021 Baseball (3A)

South Spencer Rebels (5)

- 2007 Baseball (2A)
- 2011 Baseball (2A)
- 2013 Baseball (2A)
- 2014 Softball (2A)
- 2015 Baseball (2A)

Tecumseh Braves (8)

- 1999 Boys Basketball (A)
- 2003 Baseball (A)
- 2009 Softball (A)
- 2011 Softball (A)
- 2017 Softball (A)
- 2022 Girls Basketball (A)
- 2022 Softball (A)
- 2023 Softball (A)

Tell City Marksmen (0)

Washington Hatchets (9)

- 1914 Boys' Track
- 1915 Boys' Track
- 1930 Boys' Basketball
- 1941 Boys' Basketball
- 1942 Boys' Basketball
- 2005 Boys' Basketball (3A) ^{2}
- 2008 Boys' Basketball (3A) ^{2}
- 2010 Boys' Basketball (3A) ^{2}
- 2011 Boys' Basketball (3A) ^{2}

== Former member state titles ==
Cannelton Bulldogs (0)

Wood Memorial Trojans (1)

- 2017 Girls' Basketball (A)

== State runner-up titles ==
Forest Park Rangers (4)

- 1999 Girls Basketball (2A) ^{1}
- 2003 Boys Basketball (2A) ^{1}
- 2018 Boys Basketball (2A)
- 2023 Boys Soccer (1A)

Gibson Southern Titans (6)

- 2001 Girls Softball (2A)
- 2002 Girls Basketball (3A)
- 2013 Boys Soccer (1A)
- 2013 Girls Soccer (1A)
- 2014 Girls Softball (3A)
- 2014 Boys Baseball (3A)

Heritage Hills Patriots (3)

- 2004 Football (3A)
- 2019 Football (3A)
- 2023 Football (3A)

North Posey Vikings (4)

- 2005 Football (2A)
- 2007 Softball (2A)
- 2022 Softball (2A)
- 2023 Football (2A)

Pike Central Chargers (1)

- 1990 Softball

Southridge Raiders (6)

- 1982 Football (A)
- 1998 Girls Basketball Tournament of Champions
- 2002 Football (2A)
- 2006 Football (2A)
- 2018 Baseball (2A)
- 2019 Baseball (2A)

South Spencer Rebels (2)

- 1988 Football (2A)
- 1999 Softball (2A)

Tecumseh Braves (10)

- 1999 Boys Basketball Tournament of Champions
- 2002 Baseball (1A)
- 2003 Softball (1A)
- 2007 Softball (1A)
- 2008 Softball (1A)
- 2010 Baseball (1A)
- 2013 Softball (1A)
- 2019 Softball (1A)
- 2022 Baseball (1A)
- 2024 Softball (1A)

Tell City Marksmen (1)

- 1986 Football (2A) ^{2}

^{1}Occurred when Forest Park was a member of the Blue Chip Conference.

^{2}Occurred as a member of the Big Eight Conference.

== News and facts ==
- Southridge's home gymnasium in Huntingburg has a capacity of 6,092 and is one of the 20 largest in Indiana. Boonville, Princeton, and Washington each add three more of the state's 5,000+ gymnasiums

== Alumni ==
- Gil Hodges, Petersburg – Class of 1941. Longtime member of the Brooklyn Dodgers, manager of the 1969 New York "Miracle" Mets. Also the greatest snub in the history of the Baseball Hall of Fame (Inducted into the Baseball Hall of Fame in 2022)
- Bill Feix, Tell City – Class of 1950, 2-year letterman, Captain, Vanderbilt Basketball team.
- Burke Scott, Tell City – Class of 1951, 2x All-PAC basketball player, was a starter on Indiana University's 1953 NCAA title team.
- Roger Kaiser, Dale – Class of 1957, Georgia Tech All-American, led the Dale Golden Aces to PAC Basketball titles in the 1954–55 (SO) and in 1956–57 (SR) seasons.
- Bob Reinhart, Dale – Class of 1957, future Georgia State MBB Coach was a teammate of Kaiser and led the Dale Golden Aces to PAC Basketball titles in the 1954–55 (SO) and in 1956–57 (SR) seasons.
- Del Harris, future NBA Coach, was the Dale Golden Aces Head Coach during the 1961–62 and 1962–63 seasons. (Inducted to the Naismith Basketball Hall of Fame in 2022)
- Tim Barrett, Pike Central – Class of 1979, Major League Baseball player, Montreal Expos
- Bruce King, Heritage Hills – Class of 1981, NFL Running Back, 1984–1987
- Terry Brahm, Heritage Hills – Class of 1981; 1988 Olympian; NCAA & Big Ten Champion track athlete
- Ken Dilger, Heritage Hills – Class of 1989, Super Bowl Champion Tight End, led Heritage Hills to PAC Football titles in the 1987 (JR) and 1988 (SR) seasons; Ken was also a star baseball and basketball player, helping Heritage Hills to baseball titles in 1987 and 1988; and basketball titles in 1987–88 and 1988–89.
- Parrish Casebier, South Spencer – Class of 1989, Basketball star at University of Evansville. Casebier also spent several years in South American professional leagues.
- Alex Graman, Southridge – Class of 1996, Major League pitcher, New York Yankees
- Mitch Stetter, Southridge – Class of 1999, Major League pitcher, Milwaukee Brewers, Los Angeles Angels of Anaheim
- Jon Goldsberry, Heritage Hills – Class of 2000, Purdue Boilermakers, NFL Fullback
- Jay Cutler – Heritage Hills – Class of 2001, former Vanderbilt Commodores, Chicago Bears quarterback, starred in high school football at Heritage Hills and led them to the 3A state title in 2000 (SR) and PAC titles in his three years as Varsity Starter (1998–2000).
- Ben Braunecker – Forest Park – Class of 2012, former Chicago Bears tight end, starred in high school football & track at Forest Park; consensus All-American Tight End for Harvard.
- Colson Montgomery – Southridge – Class of 2021, Chicago White Sox shortstop, starred in basketball and baseball, spurned college basketball scholarships for a professional baseball career

== Neighboring conferences ==
- Southern Indiana Athletic Conference
- Blue Chip Conference
- Patoka Lake Conference
- Southern Roads Conference

== See also ==
- Hoosier Hysteria
- Largest high school gyms in the United States
