= Bob Lochmueller =

American basketball player (1927–2020)

Personal information
- Born: June 5, 1927 Elberfeld, Indiana, U.S.
- Died: October 27, 2020 (aged 93) Tell City, Indiana, U.S.
- Listed height: 6 ft 5 in (1.96 m)
- Listed weight: 185 lb (84 kg)

Career information
- High school: Elberfeld (Elberfeld, Indiana)
- College: Oakland City (1948–1949); Louisville (1949–1952)
- NBA draft: 1952: 1st round, 7th overall pick
- Drafted by: Syracuse Nationals
- Playing career: 1952–1953
- Position: Small forward
- Number: 14
- Coaching career: 1953–1980

Career history

Playing
- 1952–1953: Syracuse Nationals

Coaching
- 1953–1954: Fort Branch Twigs HS
- 1954–1956: Princeton HS
- 1956–1957: Richmond HS
- 1957–1961: Seymour HS
- 1962–1965: West Virginia (assistant)
- 1965–1980: Tell City HS

Career highlights
- AP Honorable mention All-American (1952)
- Stats at NBA.com
- Stats at Basketball Reference

Career coaching record
- High school: 399–155 (.720)

Robert Lee Lochmueller (June 5, 1927 – October 27, 2020) was an American National Basketball Association (NBA) player. He was drafted with the seventh pick in the first round of the 1952 NBA draft by the Syracuse Nationals.

Lochmueller played for the Oakland City Mighty Oaks during the 1948–49 season. He was a 3-year starter for the Louisville Cardinals, leading them to their first NCAA Appearance (1951) and their first NIT Appearance (1952); he scored 1,218 points, averaging 15 points a game. He was selected by the Associated Press as part of their 1952 All-American Team, (Honorable Mention).

In his one NBA season, Lochmueller averaged 3.7 points, 2.6 rebounds, and 0.8 assists per game. A knee injury ended his NBA career and he moved into the high school coaching ranks in Southern Indiana; he spent 8 seasons, winning 7 post-season titles with the Ft Branch Twigs, the Princeton Tigers, the Seymour Owls and the Richmond Red Devils before moving into the college ranks. He joined his Syracuse Nationals teammate George King and began a career as an assistant coach for West Virginia; he returned to his home state as the head coach for Tell City High School.

In fifteen years as the head coach of Tell City, he won nine sectional (consecutive) and two regional championships, with a 257-96 (.728) overall record. His career record in 23 years as an Indiana high school coach is 399-150 (.727); he won 13 sectionals and 2 regionals.

Some of his well-known players include:

- Dave Clark, (Tell City High) 3-yr starter for Georgia Tech basketball
- Steve Lochmueller, (Tell City High) University of Kentucky basketball and football; Steve is Bob's son
- Bryan Taylor, (Tell City High) University of Louisville and University of Evansville basketball; Taylor was killed in the infamous 1977 airline crash that claimed the entire Evansville basketball team. Taylor started the 1976–77 season as a Sophomore for the Purple Aces, averaging 13.5 pts and 6 rbs a game. The Tell City gymnasium was renamed in his honor.
- Dave Alvey, (Tell City High) Northwest Missouri basketball; Alvey was inducted into the NW Mo State Hall of Fame in 2008, he is the # 2 career scorer and # 4 rebounder in NW Mo history.
- John Judd, (Seymour High) a star at the Air Force Academy.

In 1990, Lochmueller was inducted into the Indiana Basketball Hall of Fame.

Lochmueller died on October 27, 2020, at age 93.

== Career statistics ==
Legend
GP	Games played	GS	Games started	MPG	Minutes per game
FG%	Field goal percentage	3P%	3-point field goal percentage	FT%	Free throw percentage
RPG	Rebounds per game	APG	Assists per game	SPG	Steals per game
BPG	Blocks per game	PPG	Points per game	**Bold**	Career high

=== NBA ===
==== Regular season ====
Year	Team	GP	MPG	FG%	FT%	RPG	APG	PPG
1952–53	Syracuse	62	12.9	.322	.607	2.6	.8	3.7

==== Playoffs ====
Year	Team	GP	MPG	FG%	FT%	RPG	APG	PPG
1953	Syracuse	2	10.5	.200	.250	2.5	1.0	2.5
