= Burke Scott =

American basketball player and coach (1933–2025)

Personal information
- Born: January 12, 1933 Tell City, Indiana, U.S.
- Died: February 7, 2025 (aged 92) Ferdinand, Indiana, U.S.
- Listed height: 6 ft 0 in (1.83 m)
- Listed weight: 175 lb (79 kg)

Career information
- High school: Tell City (Tell City, Indiana)
- College: Indiana (1952–1955)
- NBA draft: 1955: undrafted
- Position: Shooting guard
- Number: 25

Career highlights
- NCAA champion (1953)

Burke H. Scott (January 12, 1933 – February 7, 2025) was an American basketball player and coach. He was starting shooting guard on Indiana University's 1953 championship team and coached at the high school level in his home state of Indiana.

Scott, a 6'0" guard from Tell City High School in Tell City, Indiana, played for coach Branch McCracken at Indiana from 1952 to 1955. Scott started each of his three varsity seasons at Indiana, and played a key role as a sophomore ball-handler and defensive specialist on the Hoosiers' 1953 national championship team. Scott led the Hoosiers to a second straight Big Ten Conference title the following season.

Following his college career, Scott spent approximately two years in the U.S. Army; he coached the Camp Carson team to a record of 27–4; losing 3 games to a Ft Leonard Wood-based team which was led by future NBA-great K.C. Jones. Each loss came during the AAU national basketball tournament in Denver.

After his Army commitment, Scott returned to Indiana and began his high school teaching and coaching career; he coached the Needmore Hilltoppers, Plainville Midgets, Cascade Comets, Loogootee St. John's Eagles and the Heritage Hills Patriots.

His 13-year record as a high-school head coach was 154–121 (.560), including a PAC title and the Wabash Valley Basketball Tourney.

Burke Scott was inducted into the Indiana Basketball Hall of Fame in 2010 alongside his two high school coaches; Ivan Hollen & Andy Taff. His college coach, Branch McCracken is also a member of the Indiana Basketball Hall of Fame. He died on February 7, 2025.
