= Jerry Denstorff =

American football player and coach (born 1936)

Biographical details
- Born: December 2, 1936; Danville, Illinois, U.S.

Playing career
- 1954–1955: LSU
- 1959: Evansville

Coaching career (HC unless noted)
- 1960–1963: Mitchell HS (IN)
- 1964–1967: Morehead State (assistant)
- 1968–1970: Bloomsburg
- 1971–1989: South Spencer HS (IN)

Head coaching record
- Overall: 10–13–1 (college)

Jerry Denstorff (born December 25, 1936) is an American former football player and coach. He served as the head football coach at Bloomsburg University of Pennsylvania from 1968 to 1970, compiling a record of 10–13–1. He played college football at Louisiana State University in 1954 and 1955 before transferring to Evansville College. Following a successful senior campaign in 1959, Denstorff was named 1st team "All-Indiana Collegiate Conference".

After leaving Bloomsburg, Denstorff began a 19-year stint as the head football coach at South Spencer High School in Reo, Indiana. He retired with a career high school football coaching record of 153–76 (.668), seven conference titles and a state finals berth in the 1988 season, when the Rebels finished the year at 12–2.

== Head coaching record ==
=== College ===
Year	Team	Overall	Conference	Standing	Bowl/playoffs
Bloomsburg Huskies (Pennsylvania State College Athletic Conference / Pennsylvania State Athletic Conference) (1968–1960)
1968	Bloomsburg	3–4–1	3–3	3rd (East)	
1969	Bloomsburg	2–6	2–4	5th (East)	
1970	Bloomsburg	5–3	3–3	T–4th (East)	
Bloomsburg:		10–13–1	8–10		
Total:		10–13–1			
