= Colson Montgomery =

American baseball player (born 2002)

Chicago White Sox – No. 12
- Shortstop
- Born: February 27, 2002 (age 24); Holland, Indiana, U.S.
- Bats: Left Throws: Right

MLB debut
- July 4, 2025, for the Chicago White Sox

MLB statistics (through 2026 season)
- Batting average: .210
- Home runs: 52
- Runs batted in: 142
- Stats at Baseball Reference

Teams
- Chicago White Sox (2025–present)

Colson Kade Montgomery (born February 27, 2002) is an American professional baseball shortstop for the Chicago White Sox of Major League Baseball (MLB). He was selected by the White Sox in the first round of the 2021 Major League Baseball draft and made his MLB debut in 2025.

== Amateur career ==
Montgomery was raised in Holland, Indiana, and attended Southridge High School in Huntingburg, Indiana, where he played football, basketball, and baseball. He also played AAU basketball for Pocket City Basketball, a youth basketball program based in Evansville, Indiana. Montgomery began his high school career being recruited mainly for basketball by schools such as Purdue University and the University of Louisville before shifting his focus to baseball. In 2018, his freshman year, he had a .387 batting average with 33 runs batted in (RBI). As a sophomore, he averaged 21.1 points per game on the basketball court. He is the all-time leading scorer in Southridge basketball history with 1,966 career points.

As a junior, Montgomery committed to play college baseball at Indiana University. He also would have been a preferred walk-on for the Indiana Hoosiers men's basketball team. In 2021, his senior baseball season, he batted .333 with seven home runs, 23 RBI, and 24 stolen bases, and led Southridge to their first ever IHSAA state championship. Following the end of the season, he traveled to Cary, North Carolina, where he participated in MLB's first ever Draft Combine.

== Professional career ==
=== Minor leagues ===
The Chicago White Sox selected Montgomery in the first round with the 22nd overall selection of the 2021 Major League Baseball draft. He signed with the White Sox for a $3 million signing bonus. He made his professional debut with the Rookie-level Arizona Complex League White Sox. Over 104 at-bats in 26 games, Montgomery slashed .287/.396/.362 with seven doubles and seven RBI.

Montgomery was assigned to the Kannapolis Cannon Ballers of the Single-A Carolina League to begin the 2022 season. He was promoted to the Winston-Salem Dash of the High-A South Atlantic League in late June. Montgomery was promoted once again in mid-August to the Birmingham Barons of the Double-A Southern League. Over 96 games between the three teams, he slashed .274/.381/.429 with 11 home runs, 47 RBI, and 17 doubles. He opened the 2023 season on the injured list with oblique and back injuries. Montgomery returned to play in early June, playing ten games with the Arizona League White Sox before being assigned to the Dash. In late July, he was promoted to Birmingham. Over 64 games, he batted .287 with eight home runs and 37 RBI. After the season, he was selected to play in the Arizona Fall League for the Glendale Desert Dogs.

Montgomery was assigned to the Charlotte Knights of the Triple-A International League for the 2024 season. In 130 games, he slashed .214/.329/.381 with 18 home runs, 63 RBI, and eight stolen bases. On November 19, 2024, the White Sox added Montgomery to their 40-man roster to protect him from the Rule 5 draft.

Montgomery was optioned to Charlotte to begin the 2025 season, batting .218/.298/.435 with 11 home runs, 30 RBI, and two stolen bases over 55 games.

=== Chicago White Sox ===
==== 2025 season ====
On July 4, 2025, Montgomery was promoted to the major leagues for the first time. He made his MLB debut that day as the White Sox starting shortstop at Coors Field versus the Colorado Rockies. He recorded his first MLB hit the next day off Rockies starting pitcher Germán Márquez, an RBI triple, and finished the game 3-for-5. On July 22, Montgomery hit his first career home run off of Bryan Baker of the Tampa Bay Rays. He hit his first career grand slam on August 23 off of Mick Abel of the Minnesota Twins. Montgomery finished his rookie year with the White Sox having appeared in 71 games and hitting .239 with 21 home runs and 55 RBI. He finished fifth in American League Rookie of the Year voting.

==== 2026 season ====
Montgomery was named to his first Opening Day roster as the White Sox starting shortstop to begin the 2026 season.

On September 25, Montgomery struck out for the 224th time of the season, which surpassed a record previously set by Mark Reynolds in 2009. It also served as a new record for a left-handed hitter, surpassing a record previously set by Adam Dunn in 2012 (also with the White Sox). Overall in the 2026 regular season, Montgomery struck out a single-season record 227 times and ended the season with a .197 batting average, 31 home runs and 87 RBI in 153 games played. He made his postseason debut in the 2026 American League Wild Card Series and recorded his first postseason hit, a solo home run, in Game 1.

== Personal life ==
Montgomery grew up a fan of the New York Yankees, citing Derek Jeter as his favorite player.
