= Bob Polk =

American basketball player and coach

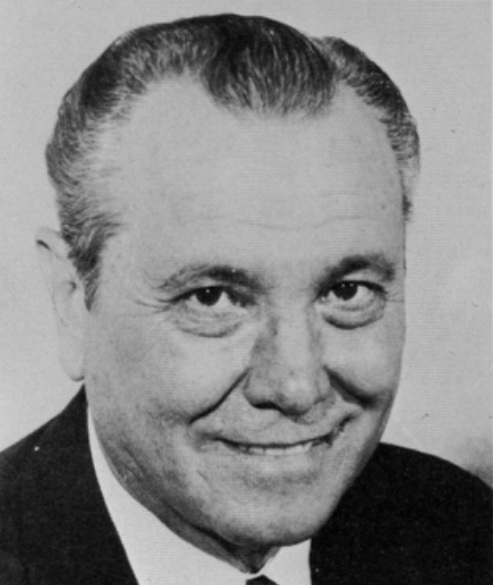
- Polk from the 1970 Archive

Biographical details
- Born: February 28, 1915; Tell City, Indiana, U.S.
- Died: March 18, 1986 (aged 71); Nashville, Tennessee, U.S.

Playing career
- 1936–1939: Evansville

Coaching career (HC unless noted)
- 1939–1943: Tell City HS (assistant)
- 1943–1947: Georgia Tech (assistant)
- 1947–1961: Vanderbilt
- 1965–1969: Trinity (TX)
- 1969–1974: Saint Louis
- 1974–1977: Rice

Head coaching record
- Overall: 355–190
- Tournaments: 0–1 (NCAA Division I); 3–1 (NCAA Division II)

Accomplishments and honors

Championships
- SEC tournament (1951); 2 Southland regular season (1967, 1969); MVC regular season (1971)

Awards
- NCAA College Division Coach of the Year (1968); 2× Southland Coach of the Year (1967, 1969); MVC Coach of the Year (1971)

James Robert Polk (February 28, 1915 – March 18, 1986) was an American basketball coach. Polk coached the Vanderbilt Commodores, the Trinity Tigers, the Saint Louis Billikens and Rice University. He began his college coaching career as an assistant coach a Georgia Tech during World War II. His first coaching job was at his high school alma mater Tell City High, in Tell City, Indiana.

== Early life ==
Polk was born in Tell City, Indiana and began to play basketball in the 4th grade. After high school, Polk attended the Evansville College from 1936 to 1939. He worked part-time at several jobs, including sweeping out the College President's office, running a movie projector, bank teller and working in a tomato canning factory. to help pay his college expenses. He was a guard on the basketball team under long-time Purple Aces' coach Bill Slyker from 1935–36 to 1938–39.

In Polk's sophomore season (1935–36), Evansille finished 11–7. This would mark the best season for the Purple Aces during Polk's college playing career.

== High school coaching ==
Polk began his career in coaching by accepting a teaching and coaching job at his alma mater Tell City High School, Tell City, Indiana. Polk had graduated only 8 years earlier (1931) after leading the Marksmen to their fifth IHSAA Sectional title. Polk assisted Ivan Hollen, who also began that season, replacing future Purdue Boilermakers' Head Coach Ray Eddy.

== College coaching ==
After a four-year tenure, Polk joined the U.S. Navy, he was assigned as a physical education instructor at Georgia Tech in the Navy's V-12 Program, he also assisted Georgia Tech head coach Dwayne Keith during the 1943–44 and 1944–45 seasons. After the war, Georgia Tech hired him as their assistant basketball coach.

In 1943, he enlisted in the US Navy and was assigned as a physical education instructor at Georgia Institute of Technology, he spent the 1943–44 and 1944–45 seasons as a Georgia Tech assistant to Dwayne Keith in addition to his US Navy duties, after the war ended he was hired in the same capacity by Georgia Tech.

In February 1947, Vanderbilt was pummeled by the Kentucky Wildcats in the SEC Tournament 98–29, the Commodores Athletic Director (and football coach) Red Sanders decided to upgrade the basketball program by hiring a full-time coach and offering scholarships. His search led him to Bob Polk (another candidate who was interviewed for the job was the future legend, John Wooden, who had led his Indiana State Sycamores to a conference title and an invitation from the NAIA.

=== Vanderbilt ===
Polk coached the Vanderbilt Commodores from 1947 to 1961. There, he won the 1951–52 SEC Tournament. Polk's Vanderbilt teams recorded one losing season in 13 seasons and finished 2nd in the SEC on four occasions. His 1954–55, 1955–56 and 1956–57 squads all finished the season in the Top 20 Associated Press poll.

In his 13 seasons as Vanderbilt coach, Polk mined the rich Southwestern Indiana talent fields to build a consistent winner; players such as SEC First Team members Dave Kardokus (1951) and SEC Second team members Billy Joe Adcock (1948–50), Al Weiss (1951), Bob Dudley Smith (1951) and Dave Kardokus. Heart problems forced Polk to resign after the 1960–61 season. When he left, Polk was the leader in wins for the Commodores (197–106, .650) and had won the 1951 SEC Tourney.

Six of his players were drafted by NBA teams;

- Bill Depp – 1961 3rd round Boston
- Jim Henry – 1959 6th round Minneapolis
- Al Rochelle – 1957 5th round St. Louis
- Dan Finch – 1954 Minneapolis
- George Kelley – 1951 Indianapolis
- Billy Joe Adcock – 1950 Fort Wayne

=== Trinity ===
Polk recovered quickly from his heart attack and accepted the head coaching and athletic director position at Trinity University in San Antonio, Texas. Polk quickly turned the Tigers into a power, leading them from the depths of the Southland Conference to the title in four seasons; he was named the Southland Conference Coach-of-the-Year in 1967 following a record of 16–6. His 1967–68 team was even better, the Tigers racked up a record of 23–7 and advanced to the NCAA College Division tournament, where the Tigers finished 3rd overall. He was also the NCAA National Coach-of-the-Year for the College Division (today's NCAA Div II) in 1968. In his four years at Trinity, Polk compiled a 70–28 record, a Southland title and a National 3rd-place finish. He was chiefly responsible for the Tigers moving to NCAA Division I classification, however, today they are an NCAA Div III school.

=== Saint Louis ===
Following his successful tenure at Trinity, Polk accepted the head coaching job at Saint Louis University; he was the 16th head coach in Billikens history and quickly turned around the program. In his 2nd season, he led them to a share of the Missouri Valley Conference championship and was named the Conference's Coach of the Year. While at St Louis, he sent two players to the NBA; Harry “Tree” Rogers and Robin Jones.

=== Rice ===
In a return to bigger conference, he accepted the head coaching position at Rice after five seasons at Saint Louis. However, he was unable to duplicate the earlier success he enjoyed at Vanderbilt. Polk served as the President of the National Association of Basketball Coaches during the 1974–75 season.

== UAB ==
In April 1977, Polk resigned from Rice and accepted a position as the assistant athletic director at the University of Alabama at Birmingham (UAB). He retired from that position in 1977. He hired Gene Bartow to build the men's basketball program.

== Death ==
Polk died of heart disease at age 71 in Murfreesboro, Tennessee, on March 18, 1986. He is buried in Tell City, Indiana. He was memorialized by his induction into the Tennessee Sports Hall of Fame in 1990.

== Head coaching record ==
Record table
Season	Team	Overall	Conference	Standing	Postseason
Vanderbilt Commodores (Southeastern Conference) (1947–1961)
1947–48	Vanderbilt	8–14	4–11	12th	
1948–49	Vanderbilt	14–8	9–5	4th	
1949–50	Vanderbilt	17–8	11–3	2nd	
1950–51	Vanderbilt	19–8	10–4	T–2nd	
1951–52	Vanderbilt	18–9	9–5	T–2nd	
1952–53	Vanderbilt	10–9	5–8	T–7th	
1953–54	Vanderbilt	12–10	5–9	T–8th	
1954–55	Vanderbilt	16–6	9–5	T–3rd	
1955–56	Vanderbilt	16–4	5–2	3rd	
1956–57	Vanderbilt	17–5	10–4	T–2nd	
1957–58	Vanderbilt	14–11	7–7	7th	
1959–60	Vanderbilt	14–9	8–6	T–5th	
1960–61	Vanderbilt	19–5	7–7	T–6th	
Vanderbilt:		197–106 (.650)	105–77 (.577)		
Trinity Tigers (Southland Conference) (1965–1969)
1965–66	Trinity (TX)	12–10	3–5	4th	
1966–67	Trinity (TX)	16–6	4–4	T–1st	
1967–68	Trinity (TX)	23–7	5–3	2nd	NCAA College Division Final Four
1968–69	Trinity (TX)	19–5	7–1	1st	NCAA Regional Quarterfinals
Trinity (TX):		70–28 (.714)	19–13 (.594)		
Saint Louis Billikens (Missouri Valley Conference) (1969–1974)
1969–70	Saint Louis	9–17	5–11	7th	
1970–71	Saint Louis	17–12	9–5	T–1st	
1971–72	Saint Louis	18–8	9–5	3rd	
1972–73	Saint Louis	19–7	10–4	3rd	
1973–74	Saint Louis	9–16	4–8	T–7th	
Saint Louis:		72–60 (.545)	37–33 (.529)		
Rice Owls (Southwest Conference) (1974–1977)
1974–75	Rice	5–21	2–12	8th	
1975–76	Rice	3–24	1–15	9th	
1976–77	Rice	9–18	3–13	8th	
Rice:		17–63 (.213)	6–40 (.130)		
Total:		356–257 (.581)			
National champion Postseason invitational champion Conference regular season champion Conference regular season and conference tournament champion Division regular season champion Division regular season and conference tournament champion Conference tournament champion
