= Blue Chip Conference =

School athletic conference in Indiana, US

- No. of teams: 7 Class A, 2 Class 2A
- Region: 5 Counties: Daviess, Dubois, Gibson, Knox, and Martin

Locations
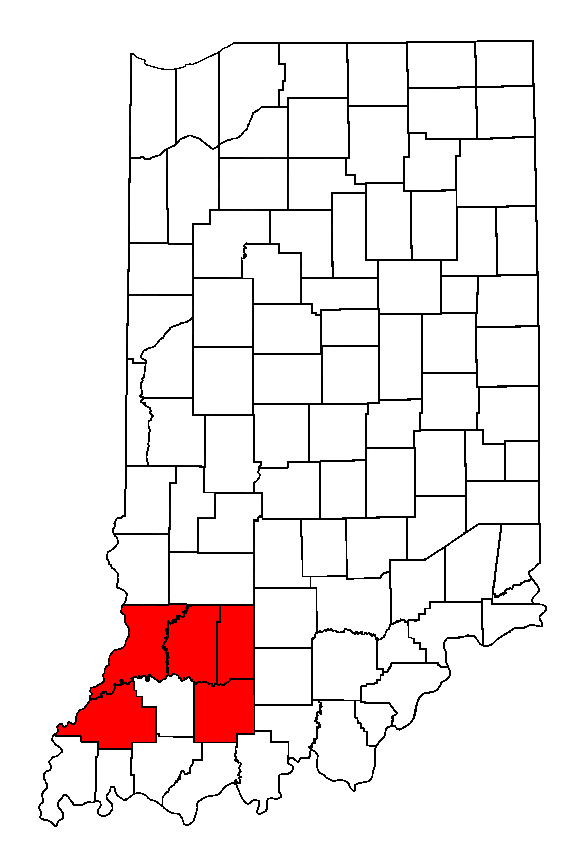

The Blue Chip Conference is a high school athletic conference in southwestern Indiana, United States. The conference's members are small A or AA high schools located in Daviess, Dubois, Gibson, Knox, and Martin counties. The BCC was founded in 1968, with Barr-Reeve, Bloomfield, Loogootee, North Daviess, North Knox, South Knox, and Springs Valley. Barr-Reeve had to wait until 1969 to be released from the Patoka Valley Conference to play in the league, and Loogootee also had to wait until 1970 to leave the Southwestern Indiana Conference. The conference grew to 11 schools in the mid-1970s, but for the most part has stabilized at nine schools since then with the only exception being the 6-year period between the addition of Wood Memorial in 2000 and loss of Forest Park in 2006 where the count was at 10. Aside from Wood Memorial, which being in Gibson County is on Central Time, the rest of the conference's members are in the Eastern Time Zone.

== Member schools ==
School	Location	Mascot	Colors	Enrollment 24–25	IHSAA Class	# / County	Year joined	Previous conference
Barr-Reeve	Montgomery	Vikings		282	1A	14; Daviess	1969	Patoka Valley
Loogootee	Loogootee	Lions		239	1A	51; Martin	1970	SW Indiana
North; Knox^{1, 2}	Bicknell	Warriors		349	2A	42; Knox	1968; 1986	Southern Indiana; Independents
Northeast; Dubois	Dubois	Jeeps		254	1A	19; Dubois	1977	Lost River
Shoals^{3}	Shoals	Jug Rox		210	1A	51; Martin	1977	SW Indiana
South; Knox	Vincennes	Spartans		393	2A	42; Knox	1968	none (new school)
Vincennes; Rivet	Vincennes	Patriots		97	1A	42; Knox	1979	
Washington; Catholic	Washington	Cardinals		61	1A	14; Daviess	1977	
Wood; Memorial	Oakland City	Trojans		200	1A	26; Gibson	2000	Pocket

1. North Knox is a member of the Southwest Football Conference for football.
2. North Knox played in the Western Indiana Conference 1977–81, then played independently from 1981 to 1986 before rejoining the BCC.
3. Shoals played concurrently in the BCC and SWIAC from 1977 to 1979.

=== Former members ===
School	Location	Mascot	Colors	# / County	Year joined	Previous conference	Year left	Conference joined
Bloomfield^{1}	Bloomfield	Cardinals		28; Greene	1968	SW Indiana	1985	SW Indiana
North; Daviess	Elnora	Cougars		14; Daviess	1968	none (new school)	1986	SW Indiana
Springs; Valley	French Lick	Blackhawks		59; Orange	1968		1979	Patoka Lake
Mitchell	Mitchell	Bluejackets		47; Lawrence	1970	Mid-Southern	1979	Patoka Lake
Forest Park	Ferdinand	Rangers		19; Dubois	1972	Patoka Valley	2006	Pocket

1. Bloomfield played concurrently in the BCC and SWIAC for its entire BCC duration.

== Conference championships ==
=== Football ===
#	Team	Seasons
3	Mitchell	1971, 1973, 1975
3	North Knox	1970, 1972, 1974
2	Springs Valley	1976. 1977
0	North Daviess	

- Football was discontinued as a conference sport after the 1977–78 school year. Mitchell and Springs Valley would move to the Patoka Lake Conference one year later, and North Daviess would be an independent until joining the Southwest Seven Conference.

=== Boys basketball ===
#	Team	Seasons
15	Barr-Reeve	1972, 1995, 1997, 1998*, 2002*, 2008, 2009, 2010, 2012, 2014, 2015, 2016, 2017, 2018, 2019
9	Loogootee	1973, 1975, 1978, 1996*, 1999*, 2002*, 2005*, 2011, 2013, 2020
7	Forest Park	1994, 2000, 2001, 2004, 2005*, 2006, 2007
4	North Knox	1996*, 1998*, 1999*, 2003
1	Springs Valley	1970
0	Bloomfield	
0	Mitchell	
0	North Daviess	
0	Northeast Dubois	
0	Rivet	
0	Shoals	
0	South Knox	
0	Washington Catholic	
0	Wood Memorial	

- Champions before 1993–94 season unverified.

=== Girls basketball ===
#	Team	Seasons
7	North Knox	2002, 2003, 2004, 2005, 2006, 2007, 2018*
7	Rivet	2009, 2010, 2011, 2013, 2014, 2016, 2018*
2	Barr-Reeve	2012, 2015
1	Loogootee	2018*, 2020
1	Northeast Dubois	2008
1	Wood Memorial	2017
1	Forest Park	2001
0	Bloomfield	
0	Mitchell	
0	North Daviess	
0	Shoals	
0	South Knox	
0	Springs Valley	
0	Washington Catholic	

- Champions before 2000–01 season unverified.

== State titles ==
=== Barr-Reeve Vikings (3) ===
- 2013 Volleyball (A)
- 2015 Boys Basketball (A)
- 2018 Girls Volleyball (A)
- 2020 Girls Volleyball (AA)
- 2021 Boys Basketball (A)

=== Loogootee Lions (2) ===
- 2012 Boys Basketball (A)
- 2020 Girls Basketball (A)

=== South Knox Spartans (0) ===
2025 Class 2A Girls Basketball State Champions

=== Vincennes Rivet Patriots (1) ===
1A Girls Basketball (2011)

=== Wood Memorial Trojans (1) ===
- 2017 Girls Basketball (A)

== Runner-Up Titles, and State Finals Appearances ==
=== Barr-Reeve Vikings ===
- 1998 Boys Baseball (A)
- 1998 Girls Volleyball(A)
- 2001 Girls Volleyball(A)
- 2002 Boys Basketball (A)
- 2007 Boys Basketball (A)
- 2008 Girls Volleyball(A)
- 2009 Girls Volleyball(A)
- 2010 Boys Basketball (A)
- 2014 Boys Basketball (A)
- 2015 Girls Basketball (A)
- 2016 Boys Cross Country - Single Class
- 2018 Girls Cross Country - Single Class
- 2019 Boys Basketball (A)

=== Wood Memorial Trojans ===
- 2007 Girls Basketball (A)

=== Loogootee Lions ===
- 2005 Boys Basketball (A)
- 1975 Boys Basketball (Pre-Class)
- 1970 Boys Basketball (Pre-Class)
- 2012 Girls Volleyball (A)
- 2007 Girls Volleyball (A)
- 2006 Girls Volleyball (A)
- 2005 Girls Volleyball (A)
- 2000 Girls Volleyball (A)
- 2021 Girls Basketball (A)
- 2020 Girls Volleyball (A)

=== Northeast Dubois Jeeps ===
- 2026 Baseball (A)
- 2005 Girls Basketball (A)
- 2012 Girls Basketball (A)

=== Vincennes Rivet Patriots ===
- 2009 Girls Basketball (A)
- 2009 Boys Baseball (A)
- 2010 Girls Basketball (A)
- 2013 Boys Baseball (A)
- 2018 Girls Basketball (A)
- 2019 Girls Basketball (A)

=== Washington Catholic Cardinals ===
- 2005 Girls Basketball (A)

== Former Member State Titles ==
=== Forest Park Rangers (3) ===
- 2001 Softball (A)
- 2005 Boys Basketball (2A)
- 2006 Boys Basketball (2A)

== Neighboring Conferences ==
- Pocket Athletic Conference
- Patoka Lake Conference
