= Washington Catholic High School =

Location
- 201 NE Second Street; Washington, (Daviess County), Indiana 47501; United States; 38°39′32″N 87°10′25″W

Information
- Funding type: Private
- Religious affiliation: Roman Catholic
- Patron saint: Saint Mother Theodore Guerin
- Established: 1857; 169 years ago
- CEEB code: 153695
- Principal: Karie Craney
- Teaching staff: 21.0(FTE (2023-24)
- Grades: 5–12
- Gender: Coeducational
- Enrollment: 299 (2023–24)
- Student to teacher ratio: 10.8∶1 (2023-24)
- Colors: Red; Black; White
- Athletics conference: Blue Chip Conference
- Sports: Basketball; soccer; tennis; volleyball; cross country; golf
- Nickname: Cardinals
- Website: wccardinals.org

Washington Catholic High School is a private, Roman Catholic high school located adjacent to the courthouse square in Washington, Indiana. It is a part of the Roman Catholic Diocese of Evansville. It is part of a larger school system that was founded by Mother Theodore Guerin in 1857. Until recently, it was under the care of the Sisters of Providence of Saint Mary-of-the-Woods.

The school's athletic nickname is the "Cardinals", and it participates in the Blue Chip Conference.
