= Ben Braunecker =

American football player (born 1994)

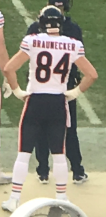
- Braunecker with the Chicago Bears in 2018

No. 84, 82
- Position: Tight end

Personal information
- Born: February 7, 1994 (age 32); Ferdinand, Indiana, U.S.
- Listed height: 6 ft 3 in (1.91 m)
- Listed weight: 247 lb (112 kg)

Career information
- High school: Forest Park (Ferdinand)
- College: Harvard
- NFL draft: 2016: undrafted

Career history
- Chicago Bears (2016–2019)

Career NFL statistics
- Receptions: 13
- Receiving yards: 142
- Receiving touchdowns: 1
- Stats at Pro Football Reference

Ben Braunecker (born February 7, 1994) is an American former professional football player who was a tight end in the National Football League (NFL). He played college football for the Harvard Crimson. He was signed by the Chicago Bears as an undrafted free agent in 2016, and played for the team through 2019.

== Early life ==
Braunecker attended Forest Park High School in Indiana, where he played for the football team on offense, defense and special teams. He started for three years and was team captain for his senior year. In his high school career, Braunecker recorded 51 receptions for 1,254 yards and 16 touchdowns. As a return specialist, he had 29 kickoff returns for 1,005 yards, while on defense, he recorded 101 tackles and seven interceptions. He was twice named All-State (Honorable Mention); he was the Southwestern Indiana MVP and twice All-Conference.

He was also a IHSAA State Finalist in the discus and shot put.

== College career ==
In his senior year, Braunecker was named a consensus All-American as he was selected to the Associated Press Football Championship Subdivision (FCS) All-America first-team, the Walter Camp FCS All-America team, the STATS FCS All-America first-team, American Football Coaches Association FCS Coaches' All-America team and the College Sporting News Fabulous Fifty FCS All-America team. He was also honored on the College Sports Madness All-America first-team and the InstantScouting FCS All-America team. He was also named first-team All-Ivy League when he recorded 48 catches for 850 yards and eight touchdowns. He finished his college career with 68 receptions for 1,168 yards and 10 touchdowns. Harvard won 3 Ivy League titles during his career, compiling a 24–4 conference record and an overall record of 36–4.

Braunecker majored in molecular and cell biology.

== Professional career ==
Braunecker attended the NFL Combine and was the fastest in the 60-yard shuttle, was ranked second in the vertical leap, broad jump, three-cone drill and 20-yard shuttle and had the third-highest repetitions in the bench press of all tight ends. He was projected by many analysts to be a fourth to sixth round draft selection. NFLDraftScout.com ranked him the sixth best tight end out of the 102 available. He attended Harvard's Pro Day and was able to beat his combine time and numbers. Braunecker chose to stand on his combine numbers for his 3-cone drill, short shuttle, and bench press.

Pre-draft measurables
Height	Weight	Arm length	Hand span	40-yard dash	10-yard split	20-yard split	20-yard shuttle	Three-cone drill	Vertical jump	Broad jump	Bench press
6 ft 3 3/8 in (1.91 m)	250 lb (113 kg)	32 3/4 in (0.83 m)	9 1/2 in (0.24 m)	4.73 s	1.63 s	2.74 s	4.20 s	6.90 s	35 1/2 in (0.90 m)	10 ft 1 in (3.07 m)	20 reps
All values from NFL Combine

Braunecker went undrafted in the 2016 NFL draft and was signed by the Chicago Bears after the draft.

He entered training camp battling for a backup tight end position with Khari Lee, Tony Moeaki, Rob Housler, and Greg Scruggs. Braunecker struggled with a severe ankle injury during the 2016 offseason and missed the entire preseason. He was released on September 3, but was signed to the practice squad the following day. Going into the regular season, he was the Bears' third option at tight end, behind Zach Miller and Logan Paulsen. On October 1, 2016, he was promoted to the active roster and was officially named the Bears' third tight end on their depth chart behind veterans Miller and Paulsen. He made his first NFL start against the Green Bay Packers on October 20.

On September 3, 2017, Braunecker was waived by the Bears and was signed to the practice squad the next day. He was promoted to the active roster on November 7, 2017.

In 2018, Braunecker played in 15 games with two starts, recording three receptions for 42 yards and three special teams tackles.

On March 11, 2019, Braunecker signed a two-year contract extension with the Bears. On November 10, 2019, he scored his first career NFL touchdown on an 18-yard touchdown pass from Mitchell Trubisky against the Detroit Lions. He was placed on injured reserve on December 15, 2019.

Braunecker was released by the Bears on July 23, 2020.

== Personal life ==
Braunecker is married to former University of Notre Dame swimmer Sydney Golic; she is the daughter of former NFL player Mike Golic.
