= Mount Vernon High School (Mount Vernon, Indiana) =

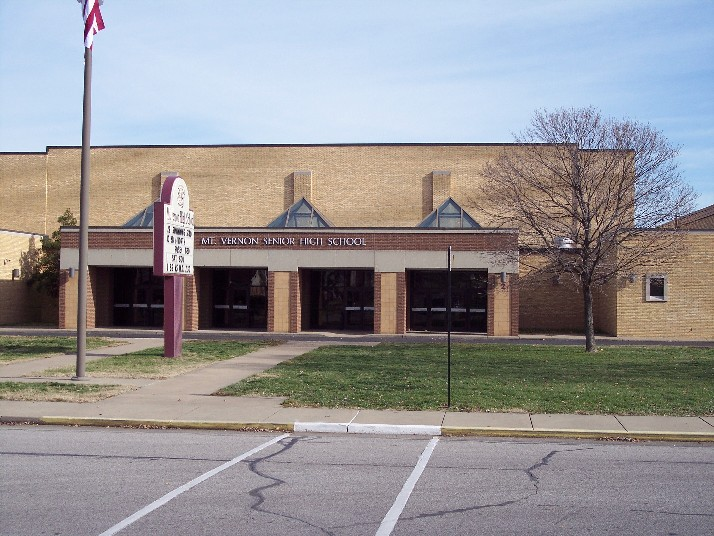

Location
- 700 Harriett St; Mount Vernon, Indiana 47620; United States; 37.937414°N 87.887032°W

Information
- Type: Public high school
- Established: 1870
- School district: M. S. D. of Mount Vernon
- Principal: Kyle Jones
- Faculty: 49
- Teaching staff: 54.00 (FTE)
- Grades: 9-12
- Enrollment: 583 (2024-2025)
- Student to teacher ratio: 10.80
- Color
- Athletics conference: Pocket Athletic Conference
- Team name: Wildcats
- Rival: North Posey High School
- Gym Capacity: 3,200

Mount Vernon Senior High School is a public high school in Mount Vernon, Indiana and is part of the M.S.D. of Mount Vernon.

== About ==
The current campus was completed in 1960 and was expanded in the 1980s. It serves high school students from 4 townships (Black, Lynn, Marrs & Point) in the southern half of Posey County.

== Athletics ==
=== Teams ===
Mount Vernon's athletic teams are nicknamed the Wildcats and the school's colors are Maroon and Gray. The Wildcats compete in the Pocket Athletic Conference in the following sports: baseball, boys and girls basketball, boys and girls cross country, football, golf, boys and girls soccer, softball, boys and girls swimming, boys and girls tennis, track and field, volleyball, and wrestling.

State Championships
Sport	Year
Track & Field - high jump (boys)	1979-80
Track & Field - shot put (boys)	1988-89
Wrestling - hwt (boys) (2)	1992-93, 1993-94

== See also ==
- List of high schools in Indiana
