= Loogootee High School =

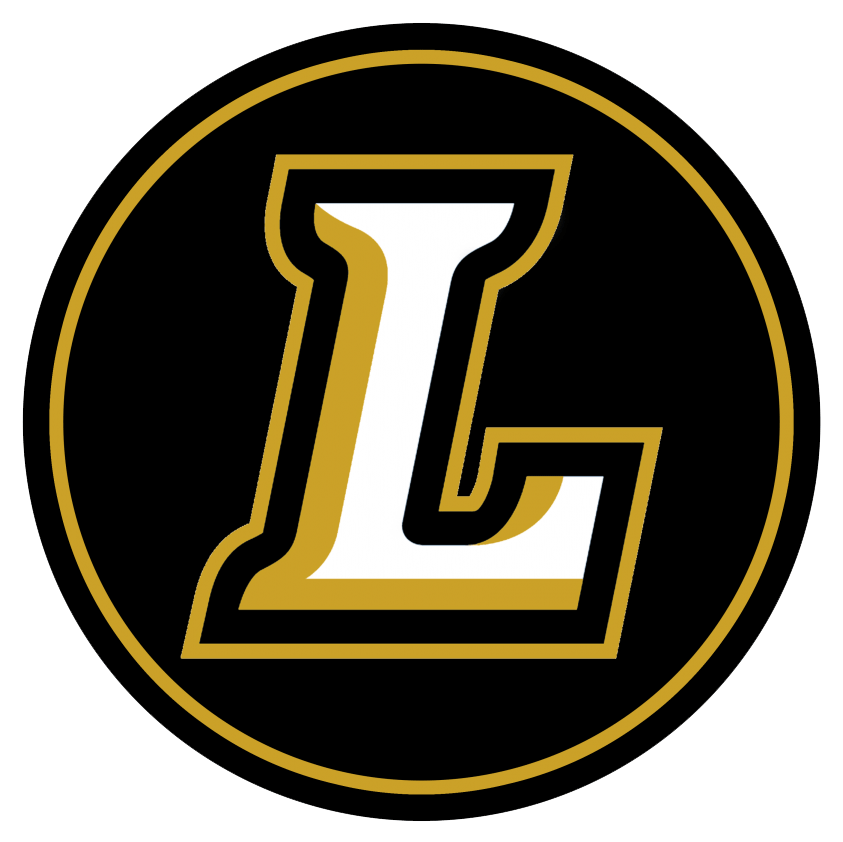

Location
- 201 Brooks Avenue; Loogootee, Indiana 47553; United States; 38°40′41″N 86°55′16″W

Information
- Type: Public secondary school
- School district: Loogootee Community School Corporation
- Superintendent: Chip Mehaffey
- Principal: Nancy Harrison
- Teaching staff: 20.00 (on an FTE basis)
- Grades: 9–12
- Enrollment: 242 (2023–2024)
- Student to teacher ratio: 12.10
- Colors: Black and gold
- Athletics conference: Blue Chip Conference
- Nickname: Lions
- Website: lhs.loogootee.k12.in.us

Loogootee High School is a public high school in Loogootee, Indiana, United States. It serves grades 9–12 for the Loogootee Community School Corporation.

== Academics ==
In the 2020 U.S. News & World Report survey of high schools, Loogootee ranked 45th in Indiana and 2,915th nationally.

== Demographics ==
The demographic breakdown of the 288 students enrolled for the 2018–19 school year was:

- Male – 56.25%
- Female – 43.75%
- Asian – 1.4%
- Hispanic – 1.4%
- White – 94.8%
- Multiracial – 2.1%

59.0% of the students were eligible for free or reduced-cost lunch. For 2018–19, Loogootee was a Title I school.

== Athletics ==
Loogootee's Lions compete in the Blue Chip Conference. School colors are black and gold. The following Indiana High School Athletic Association (IHSAA) sanctioned sports were offered for 2019–20:

- Baseball (boys)
- Basketball (girls and boys)
  - Boys state champion – 2012
  - Girls state champion – 2020
- Cross country (girls and boys)
- Golf (boys)
- Softball (girls)
- Tennis (girls and boys)
- Track and field (girls and boys)
- Unified flag football (coed)
- Volleyball (girls)

== Notable alumni ==
- Patrick Summers (born August 14, 1963) is an American conductor best known for his work with Houston Grand Opera (HGO), where he has been the artistic and music director since 2011, and with San Francisco Opera, where he served as principal guest conductor, 1999–2016.
- Mark Riggins, Major League Baseball (MLB) pitching coach

== See also ==
- List of high schools in Indiana
