= Barr-Reeve Middle/High School =

Location
- 627 North Third Street; Montgomery, Indiana 47558; United States; 38°40′08″N 87°02′56″W

Information
- Type: Public secondary school
- Established: 1965
- School district: Barr-Reeve Community Schools
- Superintendent: Andrea Huff
- Principal: Jeff Doyle
- Teaching staff: 33.50 (FTE)
- Grades: 6-12
- Enrollment: 500 (2023–2024)
- Student to teacher ratio: 14.93
- Colors: Black, white and red
- Athletics conference: Blue Chip Conference
- Nickname: Vikings
- Website: www.barr.k12.in.us/barr-reaves-middle-high-school-8fc0fc77

Barr-Reeve Middle/High School is a public secondary school located in Montgomery, Indiana, United States. It serves grades K–12 for the Barr-Reeve Community Schools. It is also one of fewer than 100 township-level high schools left in Indiana, following the wave of consolidations throughout the 1960s and 1970s.

== History ==
The school is a consolidation of Alfordsville and Montgomery High Schools, opening in 1965. Alfordsville High School opened in 1922, with its original mascot being the Yellow Jacket. Montgomery High School, opened 10 years earlier in 1912. In 1957, Montgomery High School suffered from a fire, destroying the school. In late 2020, Barr-Reeve High School finished construction, adding on a new gym and classrooms.

== Academics ==
Barr-Reeve ranked 111th in Indiana and 5,239th nationally in the 2020 U.S. News & World Report annual survey of high schools.

== Demographics ==
The demographic breakdown of the 443 students enrolled for 2018-19 was:

- Male - 48.1%
- Female - 51.9%
- Asian - 0.5%
- Hispanic - 1.4%
- White - 96.8%
- Multiracial - 1.4%

42.9% of the students were eligible for free or reduced-cost lunch. For 2018–19, Barr-Reeve was a Title I school.

== Athletics ==
Barr-Reeve's Vikings compete in the Blue Chip Conference. School colors are black, white and red. They have won nine state championships.

IHSAA State Championships
Sport	Year(s)
Boys Basketball (3)	2015, 2021, 2026
Girls Volleyball (4)	2013. 2018, 2020, 2025
Baseball (1)	2024
Softball (1)	2026

== See also ==
- List of high schools in Indiana
