= Pike Central High School =

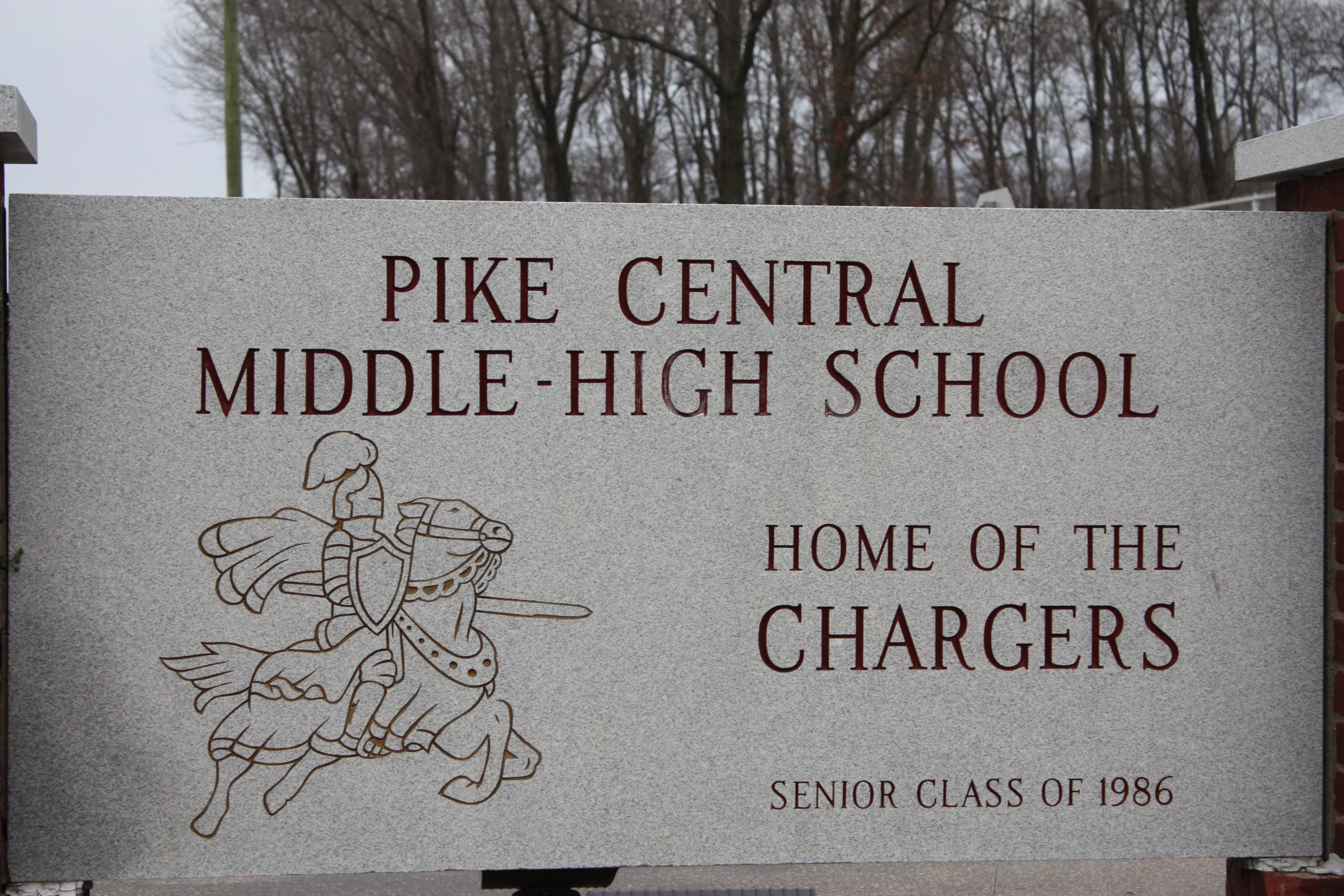

Location
- 1810 East SR 56; Petersburg, Pike County, Indiana 47567; United States; 38.434310°N 87.242458°W

Information
- Type: Public high school
- Established: 1974
- School district: Pike County School Corporation
- Principal: David Couchouner
- Faculty: 40.50 (FTE)
- Grades: 9–12
- Enrollment: 474 (2023–24)
- Student to teacher ratio: 11.70
- Colors: Burgundy, gold, and white
- Athletics: IHSAA 3A, 2A soccer
- Athletics conference: Pocket Athletic Conference
- Team name: Chargers
- Rivals: Jasper High School; Washington High School
- Website: pchs.pcsc.k12.in.us

Pike Central High School (PCHS) is located in Petersburg, Indiana, United States. It is a part of the Pike County School Corporation and the only public high school in Pike County.

== History ==
PCHS was formed in 1974 by the consolidation of Petersburg High School, Otwell High School, and Winslow High School.

There was an anti-fire water tower that was found to be damaged in a 2019 inspection and was removed in 2023.

== Athletics ==
Pike Central High School's athletic teams are nicknamed the Chargers. The school participates in the Pocket Athletic Conference.

== Notable achievements ==
In October 2010 Pike Central High School was selected as one of 14 Lemelson-MIT "InvenTeams." Their team was one of only four to present on stage at the convention. The program grants selected high schools up to $10,000 to invent technological solutions to real-world problems. More than 1,200 schools applied for the grant, and a judging panel of educators, researchers, alumni and staff from MIT; industry experts; and past Lemelson-MIT Award winners selected Pike Central High School as one of the grantees. It is the first Indiana school to be picked for the program.

The Pike Central High School InvenTeam built a lightweight disaster relief shelter that is both inexpensive and easy to assemble and disassemble. Made from corrugated polypropylene sheets, the shelter also has a water filtration system, and the team is currently working to add an alternative energy source to supply light to the structure.

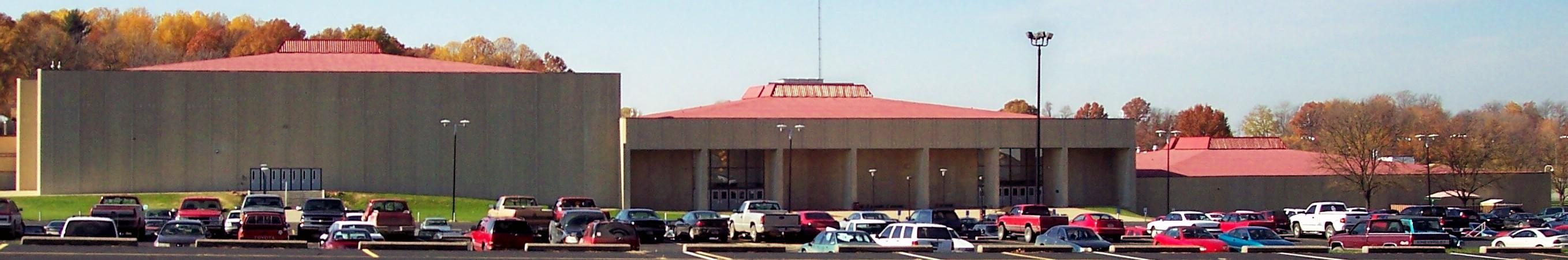
The rear of Pike Central High School

== See also ==
- List of high schools in Indiana
- Pocket Athletic Conference
