= Tell City, Indiana =

- City
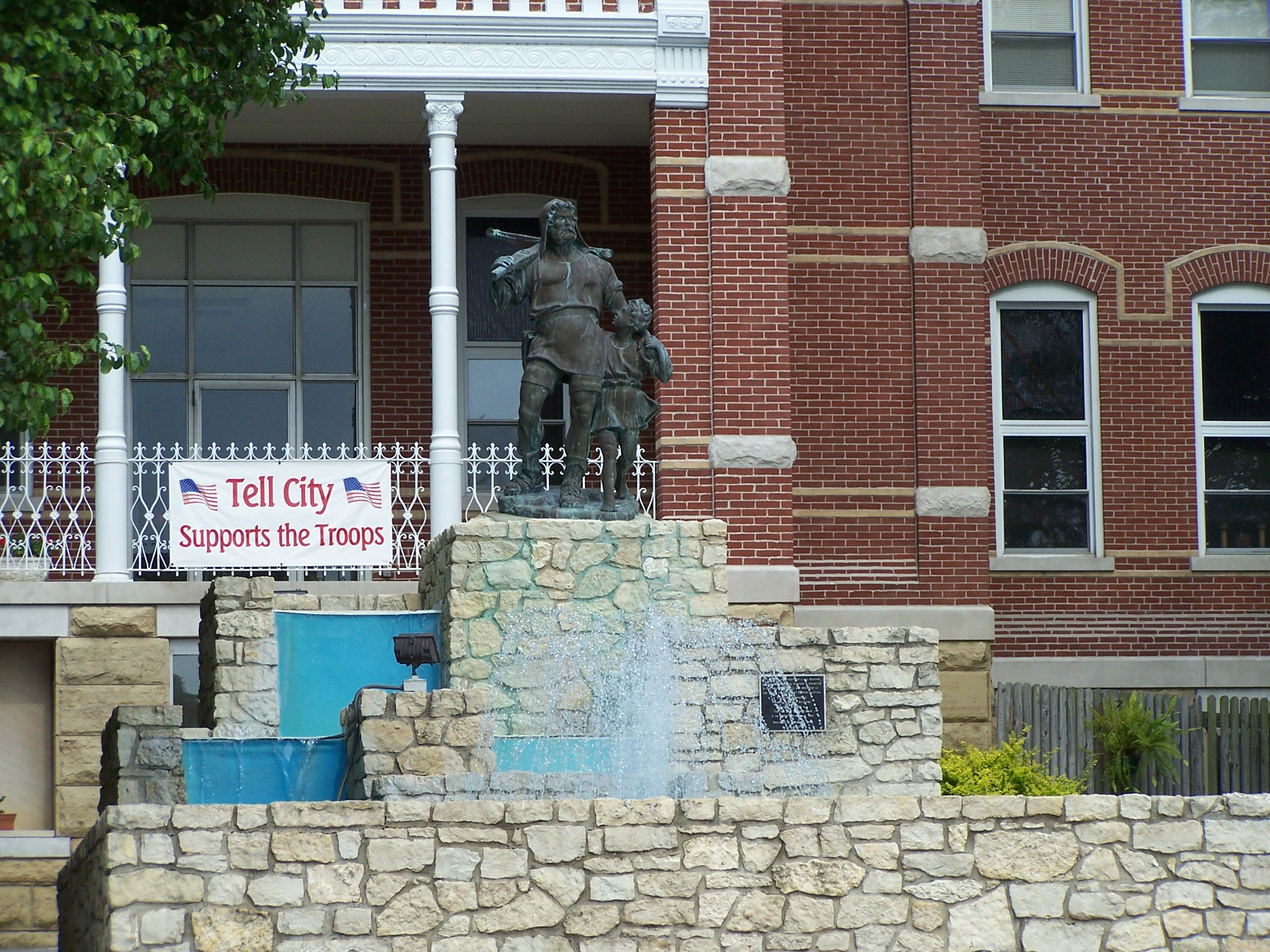
- A statue of William Tell and his son Walter sits upon a fountain outside city hall.

- Flag

- Location of Tell City in Perry County, Indiana.
- Coordinates: 37°57′11″N 86°45′21″W
- Country: United States
- State: Indiana
- County: Perry
- Township: Troy
- Acquired: July 1857
- Founded: August 1858

Government
  - Mayor: Chris Cail (D)

Area
  - Total: 4.65 sq mi (12.04 km^{2})
  - Land: 4.53 sq mi (11.74 km^{2})
  - Water: 0.12 sq mi (0.30 km^{2}) 2.37%
- Elevation: 417 ft (127 m)

Population (2020)
  - Total: 7,506
  - Density: 1,655.6/sq mi (639.22/km^{2})
- Time zone: UTC-6 (CST)
  - Summer (DST): UTC-5 (CDT)
- ZIP code: 47586
- Area code: 812
- FIPS code: 18-75248
- GNIS feature ID: 2396037
- Climate: Cfa
- Website: tellcity.in.gov

Tell City is a city in and the county seat of Perry County, Indiana, United States, along the Ohio River. The population was 7,506 at the 2020 census.

== History ==
Tell City traces its 150+ year old roots to a meeting in Cincinnati, Ohio in November 1856. A group of Swiss-German immigrants met in Cincinnati to organize a society known as the "Swiss Colonization Society." The society's purpose was to obtain affordable homesteads for mechanics, shopkeepers, factory workers, and small farmers in a location where all could live in harmony.

The Society decided to purchase a tract of land three miles (5 km) square to be surveyed as a city plot. The group was sent out to purchase the land and told to keep in mind they should find a healthful climate, fertile soil, good water, ample timber, as well as a location near a navigable river and a railroad, if possible. Purchase of a suitable site was made in July 1857. The tract, containing 4,152 acres (16.80 km^{2}), was laid out in 392 town blocks with 7,328 building lots and 294 garden lots.

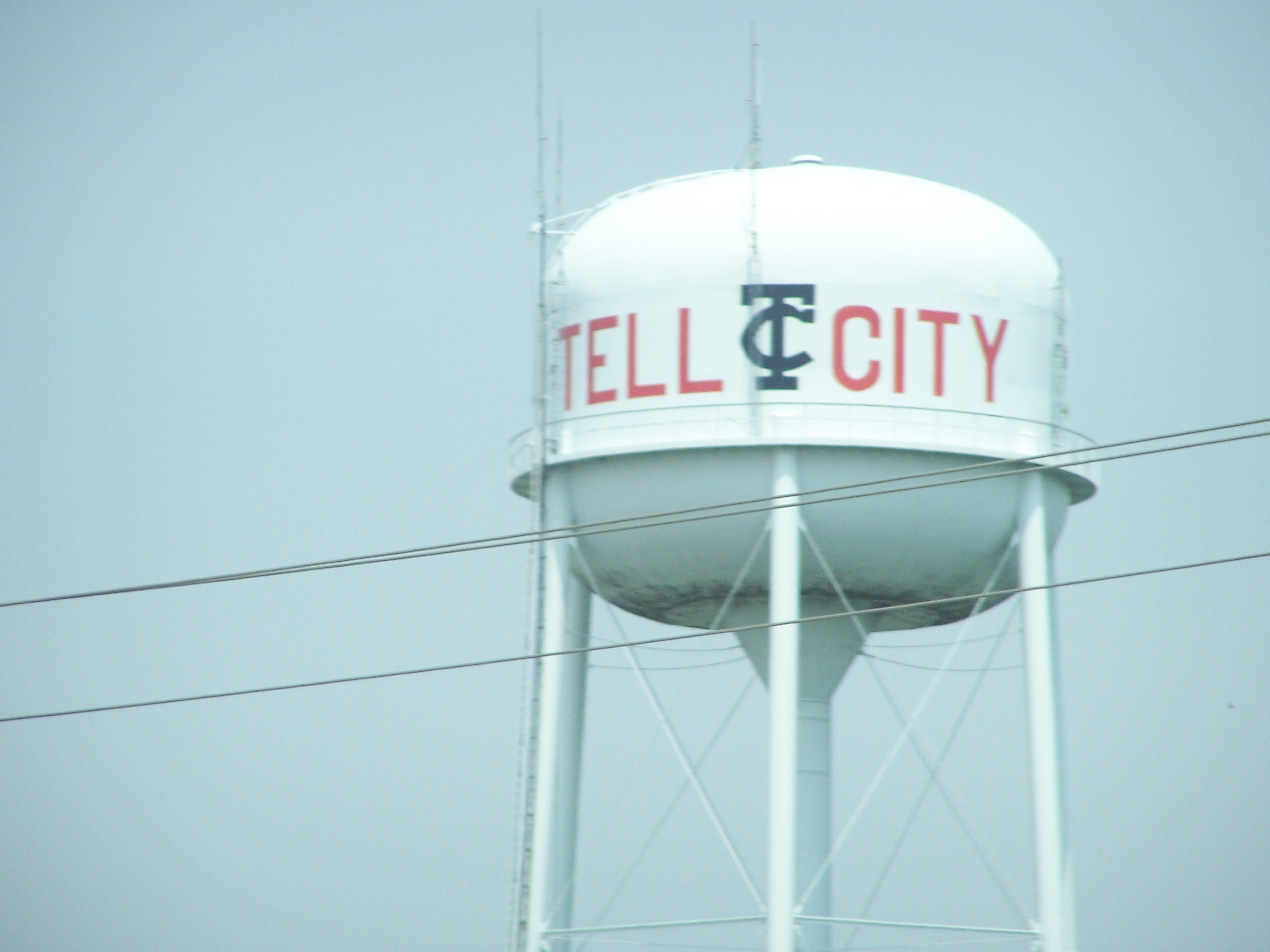
Tell City water tower

Before the settlers arrived, a name for the new town was selected. Initially called Helvetia, it was soon renamed Tell City, a name easier to pronounce and remember for English-speaking people. It was named for the legendary Swiss hero and liberator, William Tell.

The wide streets of Tell City are named for persons of the military, arts, letters and science: DeKalb, Watt, Winkelried, Steuben, Payne, Herrman, Reubens, Lafayette, Schiller, Tell, Fulton, Jefferson, Mozart, Franklin, Humboldt, Pestalozzi, Washington, Blum and Gutenberg.

The Tell City post office has been in operation since 1858.

With 100 years of recorded history, the citizens of Tell City held a centennial celebration August 10–17, 1958 in honor of the early settlers and the founding of Tell City. After the success of the Centennial, the Tell City Historical Society decided they would sponsor a festival in 1959 to determine if the community would support it as an annual event. The festival, named Schweizer Fest (Swiss Fest), was a great success. Today, the festival remains one of Indiana's longest-running community festivals.

On March 17, 1960, Northwest Orient Airlines Flight 710, a Lockheed Electra turboprop airliner flying from Chicago to Miami lost a wing due to aerodynamic flutter and crashed in southern Indiana near Tell City. All 63 on board, including the crew, perished. The victims were impacted in a 30-foot-deep (9.1 m) crater, which became their final resting place. A monument with the names of the victims and the date of the tragedy marks the grave.

Tell City became the county seat in 1994, when it was moved from nearby Cannelton.

=== Steamboat Tell City ===
The steamboat Tell City was built in 1889 and named after Tell City. It was used to carry passengers and freight on the Ohio River until it sank on April 6, 1917, in Little Hocking, Ohio. The pilothouse survived the sinking and is the oldest remaining steamboat pilothouse, located at the Ohio River Museum in Marietta, Ohio.

== Geography ==
According to the 2010 census, Tell City has a total area of 4.635 square miles (12.00 km^{2}), of which 4.53 square miles (11.73 km^{2}) (or 97.73%) is land and 0.105 square miles (0.27 km^{2}) (or 2.27%) is water.

=== Climate ===
The climate is on the far northern reaches of the humid subtropical (Cfa) zone, and closely borders a hot-summer humid continental (Dfa) climate.

Climate data for Tell City, Indiana (1991–2020 normals, extremes 1939–present)
Month	Jan	Feb	Mar	Apr	May	Jun	Jul	Aug	Sep	Oct	Nov	Dec	Year
Record high °F (°C)	79 (26)	77 (25)	88 (31)	91 (33)	96 (36)	105 (41)	105 (41)	104 (40)	106 (41)	96 (36)	86 (30)	80 (27)	106 (41)
Mean maximum °F (°C)	63.3 (17.4)	67.8 (19.9)	74.9 (23.8)	82.1 (27.8)	87.5 (30.8)	92.5 (33.6)	94.1 (34.5)	94.0 (34.4)	92.0 (33.3)	84.7 (29.3)	74.0 (23.3)	56.1 (13.4)	95.8 (35.4)
Mean daily maximum °F (°C)	40.5 (4.7)	44.7 (7.1)	54.2 (12.3)	65.7 (18.7)	74.4 (23.6)	82.2 (27.9)	85.3 (29.6)	84.7 (29.3)	79.2 (26.2)	68.1 (20.1)	54.9 (12.7)	44.4 (6.9)	64.9 (18.3)
Daily mean °F (°C)	33.1 (0.6)	36.5 (2.5)	44.9 (7.2)	55.3 (12.9)	64.6 (18.1)	72.9 (22.7)	76.3 (24.6)	75.2 (24.0)	68.8 (20.4)	57.6 (14.2)	46.0 (7.8)	37.3 (2.9)	55.7 (13.2)
Mean daily minimum °F (°C)	25.8 (−3.4)	28.2 (−2.1)	35.5 (1.9)	44.9 (7.2)	54.9 (12.7)	63.6 (17.6)	67.3 (19.6)	65.7 (18.7)	58.4 (14.7)	47.0 (8.3)	37.1 (2.8)	30.1 (−1.1)	46.5 (8.1)
Mean minimum °F (°C)	9.2 (−12.7)	12.7 (−10.7)	21.5 (−5.8)	31.8 (−0.1)	41.8 (5.4)	53.3 (11.8)	59.8 (15.4)	58.0 (14.4)	46.2 (7.9)	34.3 (1.3)	24.7 (−4.1)	15.9 (−8.9)	6.4 (−14.2)
Record low °F (°C)	−17 (−27)	−8 (−22)	−1 (−18)	20 (−7)	30 (−1)	42 (6)	47 (8)	46 (8)	31 (−1)	21 (−6)	0 (−18)	−14 (−26)	−17 (−27)
Average precipitation inches (mm)	3.70 (94)	3.49 (89)	4.74 (120)	5.30 (135)	5.82 (148)	5.05 (128)	4.12 (105)	3.01 (76)	3.71 (94)	3.93 (100)	3.93 (100)	4.48 (114)	51.28 (1,303)
Average precipitation days (≥ 0.01 in)	9.2	8.3	10.2	10.6	11.4	9.3	8.5	7.1	6.9	7.4	8.2	10.6	107.7
Source: NOAA

== Demographics ==
Historical population
Census	Pop.	Note	%±
1860	1,030		—
1870	1,660		61.2%
1880	2,112		27.2%
1890	2,094		−0.9%
1900	2,680		28.0%
1910	3,369		25.7%
1920	4,086		21.3%
1930	4,873		19.3%
1940	5,395		10.7%
1950	5,735		6.3%
1960	6,609		15.2%
1970	7,933		20.0%
1980	8,704		9.7%
1990	8,088		−7.1%
2000	7,845		−3.0%
2010	7,272		−7.3%
2020	7,506		3.2%
U.S. Decennial Census

=== 2020 census ===
As of the 2020 census, Tell City had a population of 7,506. The median age was 43.1 years. 21.2% of residents were under the age of 18 and 23.2% of residents were 65 years of age or older. For every 100 females there were 90.7 males, and for every 100 females age 18 and over there were 88.3 males age 18 and over.

97.3% of residents lived in urban areas, while 2.7% lived in rural areas.

There were 3,392 households in Tell City, of which 25.2% had children under the age of 18 living in them. Of all households, 38.9% were married-couple households, 21.0% were households with a male householder and no spouse or partner present, and 31.9% were households with a female householder and no spouse or partner present. About 38.2% of all households were made up of individuals and 18.3% had someone living alone who was 65 years of age or older.

There were 3,732 housing units, of which 9.1% were vacant. The homeowner vacancy rate was 3.0% and the rental vacancy rate was 10.9%.

Racial composition as of the 2020 census
Race	Number	Percent
White	7,094	94.5%
Black or African American	47	0.6%
American Indian and Alaska Native	22	0.3%
Asian	73	1.0%
Native Hawaiian and Other Pacific Islander	2	0.0%
Some other race	53	0.7%
Two or more races	215	2.9%
Hispanic or Latino (of any race)	112	1.5%

=== 2010 census ===
As of the census of 2010, there were 7,272 people, 3,224 households, and 1,971 families residing in the city. The population density was 1,605.3 inhabitants per square mile (619.8/km^{2}). There were 3,574 housing units at an average density of 789.0 per square mile (304.6/km^{2}). The racial makeup of the city was 97.5% White, 0.3% African American, 0.3% Native American, 0.7% Asian, 0.3% from other races, and 0.9% from two or more races. Hispanic or Latino of any race were 1.0% of the population.

There were 3,224 households, of which 28.4% had children under the age of 18 living with them, 44.9% were married couples living together, 11.4% had a female householder with no husband present, 4.8% had a male householder with no wife present, and 38.9% were non-families. 34.3% of all households were made up of individuals, and 16.5% had someone living alone who was 65 years of age or older. The average household size was 2.23 and the average family size was 2.84.

The median age in the city was 42 years. 22% of residents were under the age of 18; 7.6% were between the ages of 18 and 24; 24.1% were from 25 to 44; 27% were from 45 to 64; and 19.3% were 65 years of age or older. The gender makeup of the city was 47.5% male and 52.5% female.

=== 2000 census ===
As of the census of 2000, there were 7,845 people, 3,404 households, and 2,161 families residing in the city. The population density was 1,721.4 inhabitants per square mile (664.6/km^{2}). There were 3,700 housing units at an average density of 811.9 per square mile (313.5/km^{2}). The racial makeup of the city was 98.65% White, 0.27% African American, 0.18% Native American, 0.23% Asian, 0.04% Pacific Islander, 0.14% from other races, and 0.50% from two or more races. Hispanic or Latino of any race were 0.89% of the population.

There were 3,404 households, out of which 26.4% had children under the age of 18 living with them, 49.3% were married couples living together, 10.7% had a female householder with no husband present, and 36.5% were non-families. 33.3% of all households were made up of individuals, and 17.2% had someone living alone who was 65 years of age or older. The average household size was 2.25 and the average family size was 2.85.

In the city, the population was spread out, with 21.9% under the age of 18, 9.2% from 18 to 24, 25.4% from 25 to 44, 22.7% from 45 to 64, and 20.8% who were 65 years of age or older. The median age was 41 years. For every 100 females, there were 89.5 males. For every 100 females age 18 and over, there were 84.6 males.

The median income for a household in the city was $31,045, and the median income for a family was $41,300. Males had a median income of $31,908 versus $21,232 for females. The per capita income for the city was $17,443. About 8.0% of families and 11.2% of the population were below the poverty line, including 15.7% of those under age 18 and 8.8% of those age 65 or over.

== Education ==
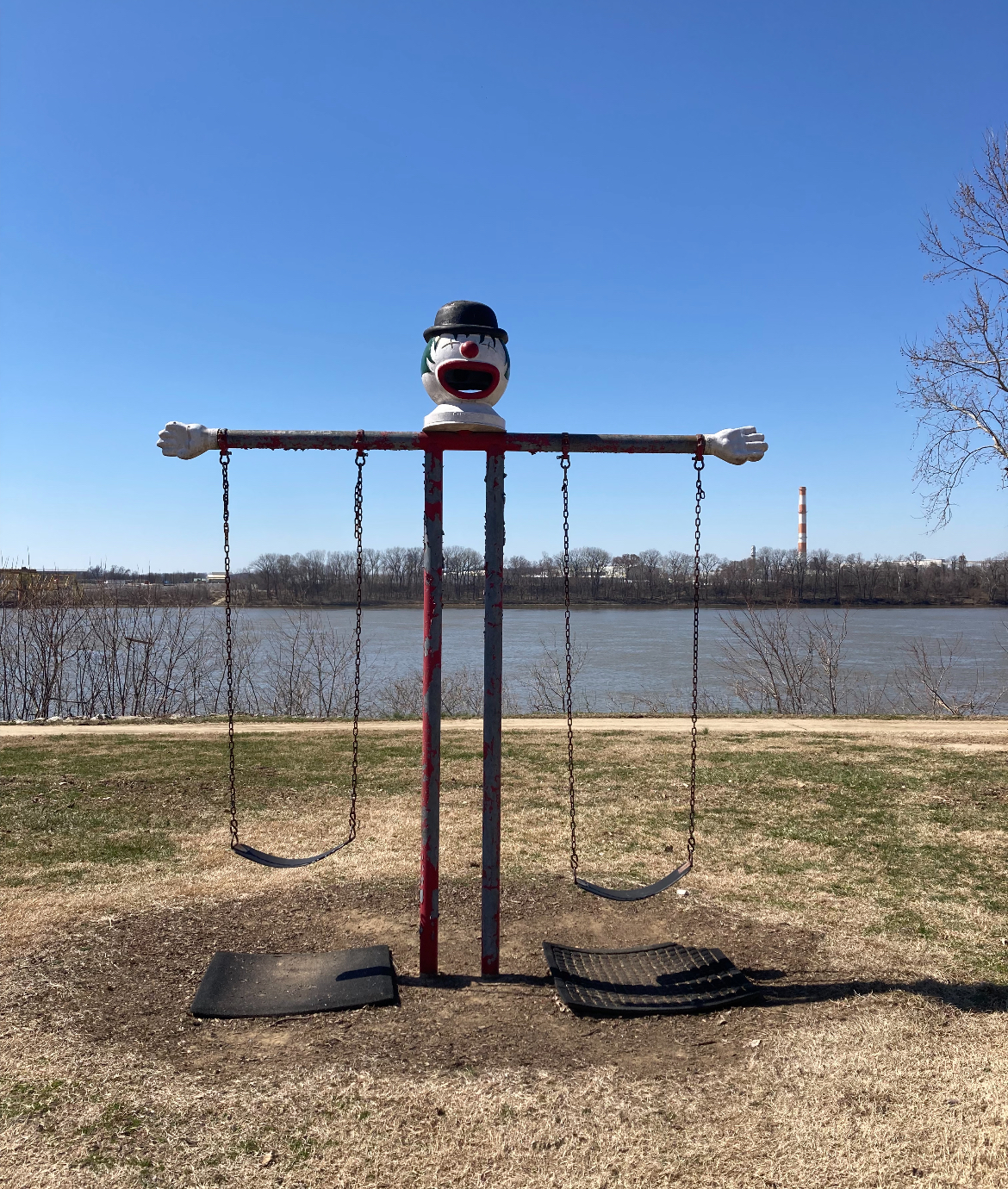
Swing set at Sunset Park on the Ohio River

It is in the Tell City-Troy Township School Corporation. Tell City is home to the Tell City Junior-Senior High School Marksmen. The school is in Class 2A for football, basketball, and baseball. The city is also home to the other school William Tell Elementary.

Tell City has a public library, a branch of the Perry County Public Library.

== Notable people ==
- Krista Blunk - former college basketball star
- Wally Bruner - American journalist and television host
- Ray Eddy - former college basketball coach of the Purdue Boilermakers
- Paul D. Etienne - Sixth Archbishop of Seattle
- Rory Kramer - photographer and filmmaker
- Tom Kron - former college (Univ of Kentucky) and professional basketball star
- Bob Lochmueller - former NBA player, college & high school basketball coach
- Edwin D. Patrick - commander of the 6th Infantry Division during World War II
- Bob Polk - former college basketball coach
- Burke Scott - former college basketball player and U.S. Army Officer

== See also ==
- List of cities and towns along the Ohio River
