= Southridge High School (Indiana) =

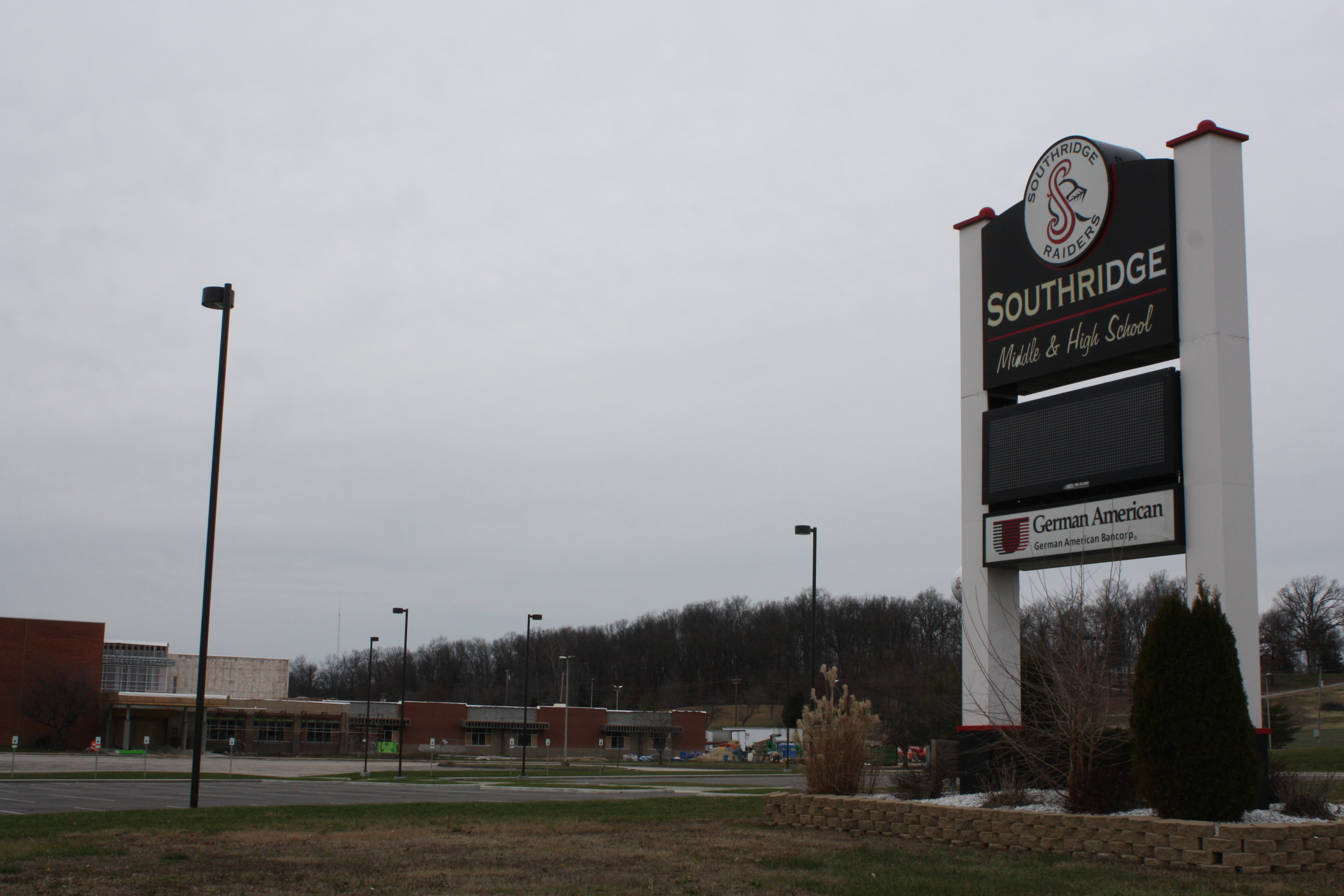

Location
- 1110 South Main Street; Huntingburg, Indiana 47542; United States; 38°16′30″N 86°57′53″W

Information
- Type: Public high school
- Established: 1972
- School district: Southwest Dubois County School Corporation
- Principal: Greg Gogel
- Teaching staff: 33.20 (on a FTE basis)
- Grades: 9-12
- Enrollment: 583 (2024-2025)
- Student to teacher ratio: 17.56
- Colors: Red, black, and white
- Athletics conference: Pocket Athletic Conference; Small School Division
- Nickname: Raiders
- Rival: Jasper High School
- Website: shs.swdubois.k12.in.us

Southridge High School is a 9 - 12th grade public school in the Southwest Dubois County School Corporation school district in Dubois County, Indiana. It is located on the south side of Huntingburg along US Route 231.

The district (of which Southridge is the sole comprehensive high school) includes Huntingburg and Holland.

== Athletics ==
Southridge is a member of the Pocket Athletic Conference and a class 3A member of the IHSAA. The school colors are red, black and white and the sports teams are called the Raiders.

The Raiders were the 1998 2A girls' basketball state champions. Southridge also won the 2017 2A football state championship and were 2018 2A regional champions, causing them to be moved up into 3A. They are also back-to-back state runner-up in 2A baseball, which has also resulted in a move into 3A in that sport.

In 2021, Southridge won the 2021 3A Baseball State Championship.

== Notable alumni ==
- Alex Graman—former MLB player for the New York Yankees, minor league player for the Cincinnati Reds, as well as the Saitama Seibu Lions (Japanese leagues)
- Mitch Stetter—former MLB player for the Milwaukee Brewers and minor league player for the Los Angeles Angels of Anaheim
- Tim Barrett—former MLB player for the Montreal Expos
- Colson Montgomery—current MLB shortstop for the Chicago White Sox. Named Indiana's 2021 Male Athlete of the year.

== See also ==
- List of high schools in Indiana
