= Fort Branch High School =

Coordinates: 38.241077°N 87.576726°W

- Twigs
- Fort Branch, Indiana; United States

Information
- Type: Public High School
- Closed: 1974; Consolidated into Gibson Southern.
- School district: South Gibson
- Grades: K-12
- Enrollment: 275 (1973)
- Color
- Athletics conference: Pocket
- Mascot: Twigs

Fort Branch High School, was a public high school located in Fort Branch, Indiana.

== History ==
Fort Branch High School, established in 1922, was one of the three high schools under South Gibson School Corporation that merged into Gibson Southern High School in 1974. Like the current Fort Branch Community School, Fort Branch High School's mascot was the Twigs, and the school colors were black and gold. Fort Branch was part of the Pocket Athletic Conference shortly before the merging. The building was then used as the Fort Branch Middle School (grades 6–8) until 1982, when the current Fort Branch Community School building was completed. The school was then subsequently demolished. The original Fort Branch High School gymnasium continues to be used for community functions and was recently rebuilt as a community center
