= Tell City Junior-Senior High School =

Tell City Junior Senior High School

Location
- 900 12th Street; Tell City, Perry County, Indiana 47586; United States; 37°57′17″N 86°45′48″W

Information
- Type: Public high school
- Established: 1922
- School district: Tell City-Troy Township School Corporation
- Principal: Brad Ramsey
- Teaching staff: 44.00 (on a FTE basis)
- Grades: 7–12
- Enrollment: 616 (2023–2024)
- Student to teacher ratio: 14.00
- Color
- Athletics conference: Pocket Athletic Conference
- Nickname: Marksmen
- Rival: Perry Central High School
- Website: tcjshs.tellcity.k12.in.us/o/tcjshs

Tell City Junior-Senior High School is a public school in Tell City, Indiana, United States. It is a part of the Tell City-Troy Township School Corporation, which includes the cities of Tell City and Troy. The senior high mascot is the Marksmen; the junior high mascot is the Archers.

== History ==
Previously Troy had its own high school, but at one point the students were moved to Tell City High School.

== Athletics ==
The Tell City Marksmen are members of the Pocket Athletic Conference. The school colors are cream and crimson. The following IHSAA sanctioned sports are offered:

- Baseball (boys)
- Basketball (girls and boys)
- Cross country (girls and boys)
- Football (boys)
- Golf (girls and boys)
- Soccer (girls and boys)
- Softball (girls)
- Swimming (girls and boys)
- Tennis (girls and boys)
- Track (girls and boys)
- Volleyball (girls)
- Wrestling (boys)

== Arts ==
Tell City has a marching band and a chorus that participate in interscholastic competition.

== Notable alumni ==
- Krista Blunk – TV personality
- Wally Bruner – journalist, radio station owner – Class of 1949
- Paul D. Etienne – Archbishop of Seattle – Class of 1977
- Tommy Kron – NBA basketball player
- Bob Polk – college basketball coach
- Burke Scott – college basketball player and high school basketball coach

== See also ==
- List of high schools in Indiana
