= South Spencer High School =

Public high school in Reo, Indiana

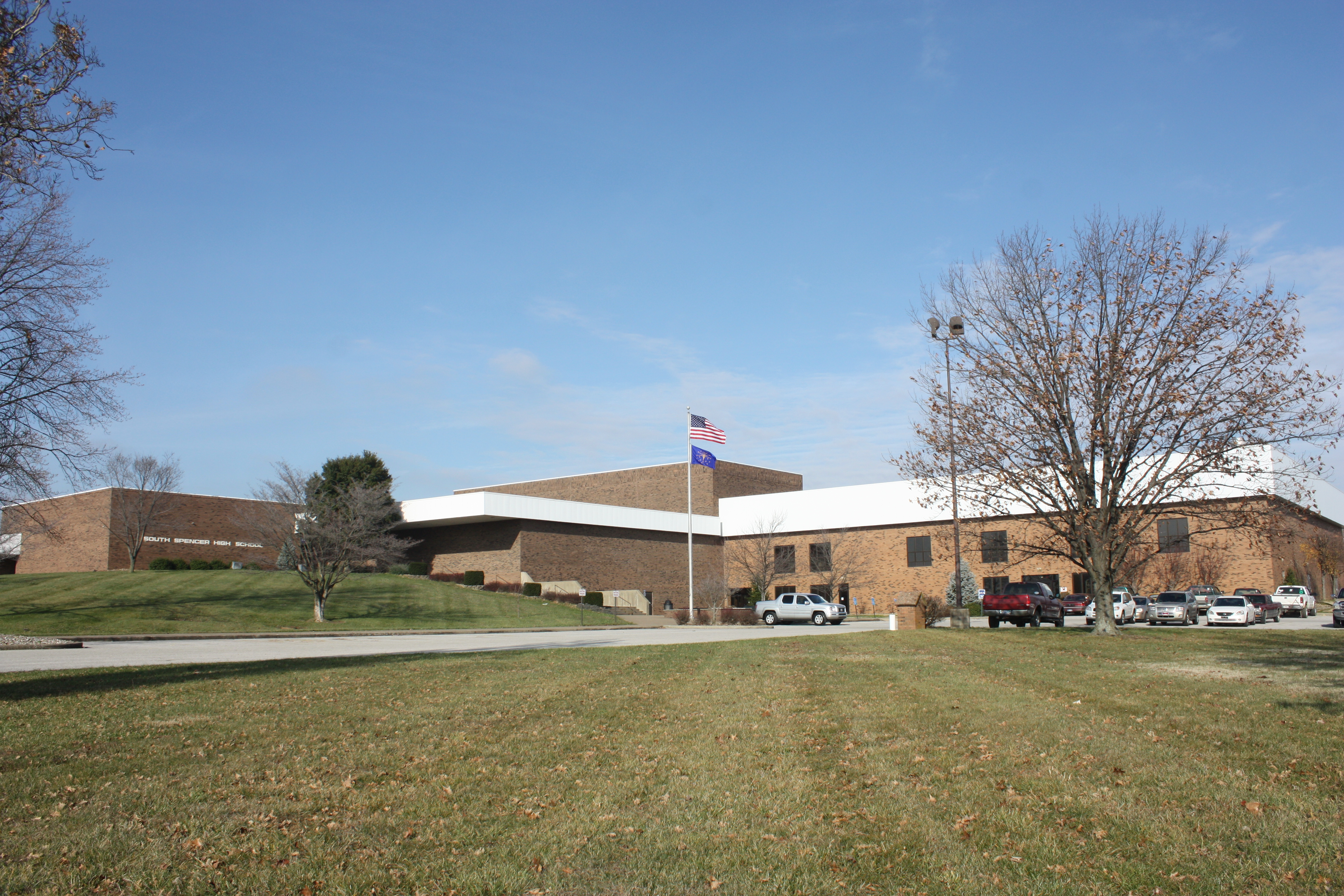

Location
- 1142 N. Orchard Road; Rockport, Spencer County, Indiana 47635; United States; 37.903502°N 87.106339°W

Information
- Type: Public high school
- School district: South Spencer School Corporation
- Teaching staff: 29.83 (FTE)
- Grades: 9 to 12
- Enrollment: 352 (2023-2024)
- Student to teacher ratio: 11.80
- Color
- Athletics conference: IHSAA Pocket Athletic Conference
- Mascot: Rebel Man
- Team name: Rebels
- Gym Capacity: 3,500
- Website: Official Website

South Spencer High School is a public high school in Reo, Indiana. The school educates about 352 students in grades 9 to 12 in the South Spencer School Corporation district.

== History ==
The school formed in 1965 by the merger of Luce Township High School and Rockport High School.

== Athletics ==
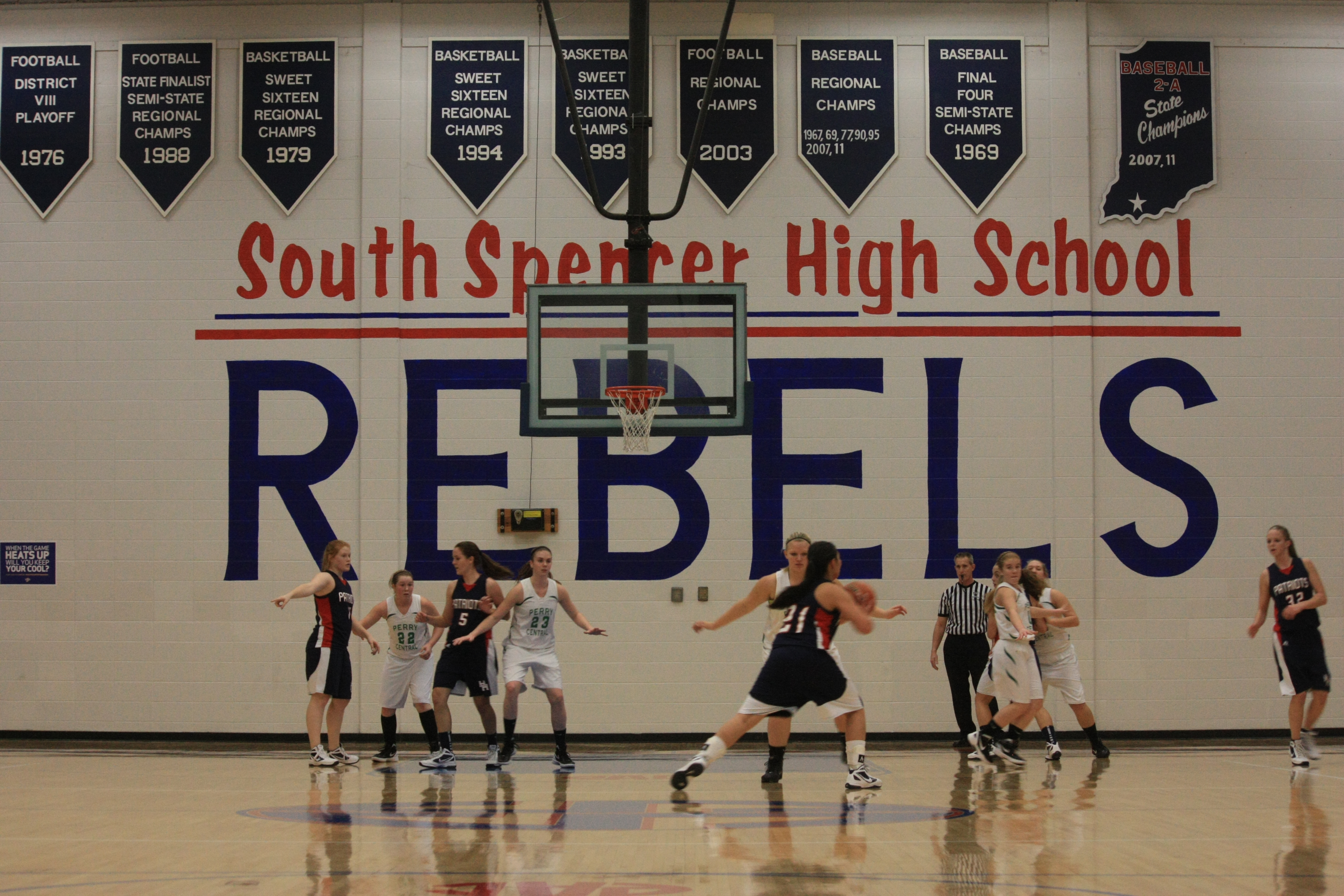
South Spencer High School's gymnasium

The school's athletic nickname is the "Rebels", and it participates in the Pocket Athletic Conference.

=== Baseball ===
In 2007, 2011, 2013, & 2015 the boys' baseball team won the Division 2A State Title.

== Mascot ==
The mascot of South Spencer is the Rebel Man.

== See also ==
- List of high schools in Indiana
