= Holland, Indiana =

- Town
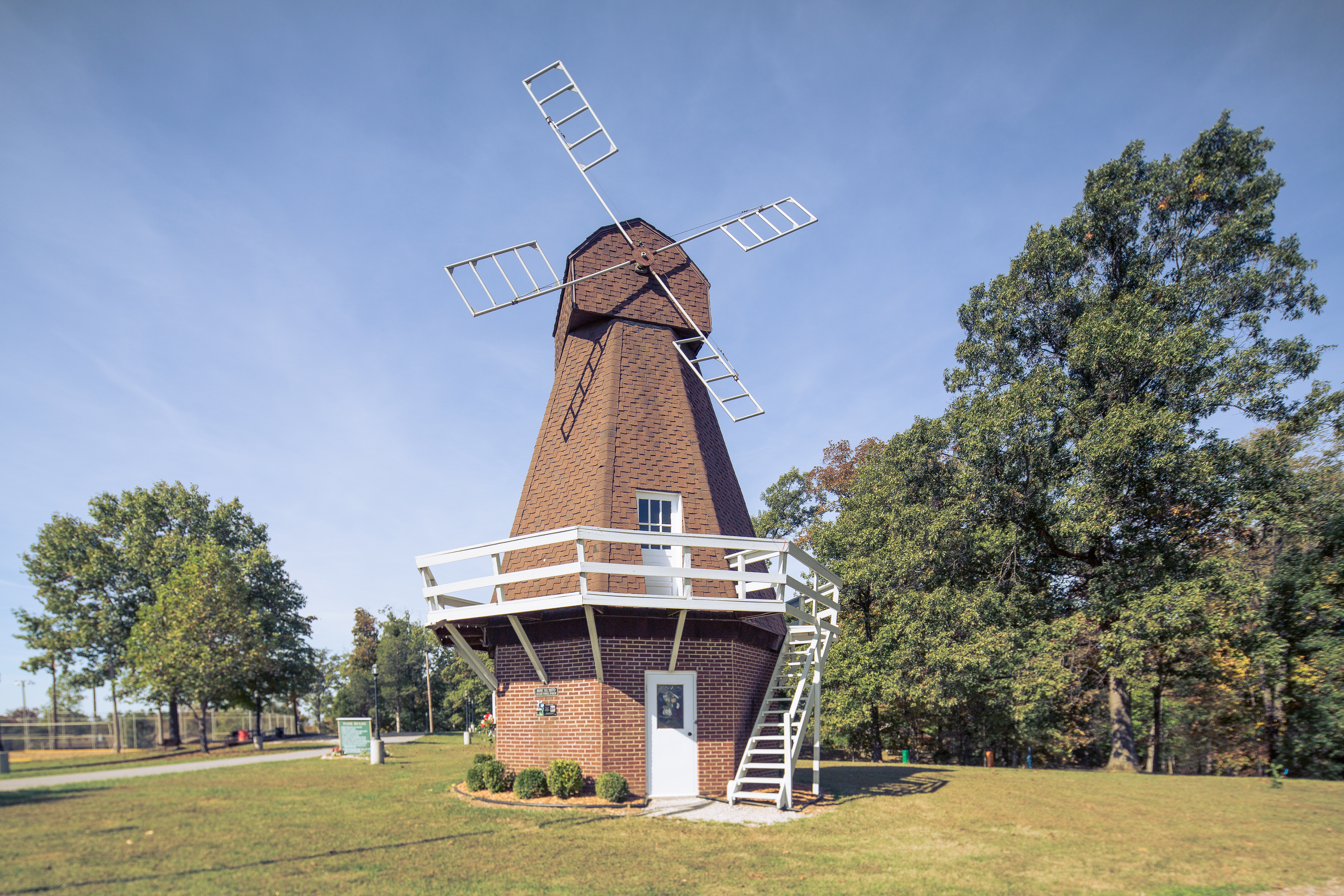

- Seal

- Location of Holland in Dubois County, Indiana.
- Coordinates: 38°14′47″N 87°02′18″W
- Country: United States
- State: Indiana
- County: Dubois
- Township: Cass
- 1859: Established

Area
  - Total: 0.37 sq mi (0.97 km^{2})
  - Land: 0.37 sq mi (0.97 km^{2})
  - Water: 0.0039 sq mi (0.01 km^{2})
- Elevation: 528 ft (161 m)

Population (2020)
  - Total: 619
  - Density: 1,657.4/sq mi (639.94/km^{2})
- Time zone: UTC-5 (Eastern (EST))
  - Summer (DST): UTC-5 (EST)
- ZIP code: 47541
- Area code: 812
- FIPS code: 18-34294
- GNIS feature ID: 2396996

Holland is a town in Cass Township, Dubois County, in the U.S. state of Indiana. The population was 619 at the 2020 census. It is part of the Jasper Micropolitan Statistical Area.

== History ==
Holland was platted in 1859 by Henry Kunz, a native of Germany. It was named for Holland (The Netherlands).

The Holland post office has been in operation since 1856.

== Geography ==
According to the 2010 census, Holland has a total area of 0.31 square miles (0.80 km^{2}), all land.

== Demographics ==
Historical population
Census	Pop.	Note	%±
1880	199		—
1930	323		—
1940	380		17.6%
1950	501		31.8%
1960	661		31.9%
1970	662		0.2%
1980	683		3.2%
1990	675		−1.2%
2000	695		3.0%
2010	626		−9.9%
2020	619		−1.1%
U.S. Decennial Census

=== 2010 census ===
At the 2010 census, there were 626 people, 252 households and 168 families living in the town. The population density was 1,956.3 inhabitants per square mile (755.3/km^{2}). There were 277 housing units at an average density of 865.6 per square mile (334.2/km^{2}). The racial makeup of the town was 96.0% White, 0.2% African American, 0.6% Native American, 0.3% Asian, 0.2% Pacific Islander, 2.2% from other races, and 0.5% from two or more races. Hispanic or Latino of any race were 3.7% of the population.

There were 252 households, of which 31.7% had children under the age of 18 living with them, 52.4% were married couples living together, 10.7% had a female householder with no husband present, 3.6% had a male householder with no wife present, and 33.3% were non-families. 27.4% of all households were made up of individuals, and 13.5% had someone living alone who was 65 years of age or older. The average household size was 2.48 and the average family size was 3.04.

The median age was 37.9 years. 26% of residents were under the age of 18; 5.8% were between the ages of 18 and 24; 27.4% were from 25 to 44; 24.1% were from 45 to 64; and 16.6% were 65 years of age or older. The population was 48.2% male and 51.8% female.

=== 2000 census ===
At the 2000 census, there were 695 people, 270 households and 190 families living in the town. The population density was 1,988.5 inhabitants per square mile (767.8/km^{2}). There were 287 housing units at an average density of 821.2 per square mile (317.1/km^{2}). The racial makeup was 98.13% White, 0.29% Native American, 0.43% Asian, 0.86% from other races, and 0.29% from two or more races. Hispanic or Latino of any race were 2.16% of the population.

There were 270 households, of which 36.3% had children under the age of 18 living with them, 58.9% were married couples living together, 8.1% had a female householder with no husband present, and 29.3% were non-families. 26.3% of all households were made up of individuals, and 14.1% had someone living alone who was 65 years of age or older. The average household size was 2.57 and the average family size was 3.12.

28.6% of the population were under the age of 18, 7.9% from 18 to 24, 29.4% from 25 to 44, 18.8% from 45 to 64, and 15.3% who were 65 years of age or older. The median age was 35 years. For every 100 females, there were 93.6 males. For every 100 females age 18 and over, there were 97.6 males.

The median household income was $35,500 and the median family income was $44,271. Males had a median income of $30,833 females $21,563. The per capita income was $16,179. About 5.0% of families and 9.2% of the population were below the poverty line, including 15.2% of those under age 18 and 8.4% of those age 65 or over.

== Education ==
Holland is in the Southwest Dubois County School Corporation school district. Southridge High School in Huntingburg is the district's comprehensive, and only, high school.

Prior to 1972, the community had its own high school. The school colors were red and white, and the mascot was the Dutchmen. That year, the high school merged into Southridge High School.
