= Forest Park High School (Indiana) =

Forest Park Junior-Senior High School

Location
- 1440 Michigan St; Ferdinand, Indiana 47532; United States; 38.227586674509304°N 86.85782373979069°W

Information
- Type: Public high school
- Motto: A place where everybody is somebody
- School district: Southeast Dubois County School Corporation
- Superintendent: Jamie Pund
- Principal: Matt Thompson
- Teaching staff: 43.25 (FTE)
- Grades: 7–12
- Enrollment: 521 (2023–2024)
- Student to teacher ratio: 12.05
- Color
- Athletics conference: Pocket Athletic Conference
- Nickname: Rangers
- Newspaper: The Lookout
- Website: fp.sedubois.k12.in.us

Forest Park Jr-Sr High School is a 7–12 grade public learning institution located in Ferdinand, Indiana. It serves the Southeast Dubois County School Corporation.

== Academics ==
The traditional public school is accredited by the Indiana Department of Education and received an "A" grade from the state and a "meets expectations" federal rating based on student achievement in the 2018–19 school year. Forest Park offers more than a dozen dual credit courses through partnerships with Ivy Tech Community College of Indiana and Vincennes University, allowing students to earn high school and college credit simultaneously.

Forest Park Jr./Sr. High School's graduation rate of 93% exceeds the state average of 87%, according to the state's 2019-20 cohort data.

== Athletics and clubs ==
=== Athletics ===
The boys basketball program won back to back state championships (2004–05, 2005–06); they were also state finalists in 2002–03 and 2017–18. The girls softball team took the state title for the 2000–2001 season. The girls basketball team won the 2A state championship in 2022 and 2023.

=== Marching band ===
Forest Park's marching band, known as the Marching Rangers, has won 12 state championships since 1973 (1981, 1982, 1985, 1986, 2001, 2008, 2012, 2013, 2014, 2015, 2018 and 2023).

== Notable alumni ==
- Ben Braunecker - National Football League (NFL) tight end
- Sue Ellspermann - President, Ivy Tech Community College of Indiana and the 50th Lieutenant Governor of Indiana

== See also ==
- List of high schools in Indiana
