= National Register of Historic Places listings in Gibson County, Indiana =

Location of Gibson County in Indiana

This is a list of the National Register of Historic Places listings in Gibson County, Indiana.

This is intended to be a complete list of the properties and districts on the National Register of Historic Places in Gibson County, Indiana, United States. Latitude and longitude coordinates are provided for many National Register properties and districts; these locations may be seen together in a map.

There are 14 properties and districts listed on the National Register in the county.

Properties and districts located in incorporated areas display the name of the municipality, while properties and districts in unincorporated areas display the name of their civil township. Properties and districts split between multiple jurisdictions display the names of all jurisdictions.

This National Park Service list is complete through NPS recent listings posted June 6, 2026.

== Current listings ==
	Name on the Register	Image	Date listed	Location	City or town	Description
1	William M. Cockrum House	William M. Cockrum House	September 13, 1978 (#78000031)	627 W. Oak St. 38°20′15″N 87°21′13″W	Oakland City	
2	Gibson County Courthouse	Gibson County Courthouse	September 27, 1984 (#84001038)	Town Square; 38°21′20″N 87°34′05″W	Princeton	
3	Haubstadt State Bank	Haubstadt State Bank	December 27, 1984 (#84000489)	101 S. Main St. 38°12′18″N 87°34′28″W	Haubstadt	
4	Lyles Consolidated School	Lyles Consolidated School	September 9, 1999 (#99001111)	953 County Rd. 500 W 38°22′11″N 87°39′36″W	Lyles Station	
5	Mussel Knoll Archeological Site (12GI11)	Mussel Knoll Archeological Site (12GI11)	March 18, 1986 (#86000454)	Along the Wabash River in the middle of Section 14 in far northeastern Wabash Township, west of Skelton; 38°20′25″N 87°49′22″W	Wabash Township and Montgomery Township	
6	Old Red Covered Bridge		May 27, 2026 (#100013074)	Adjacent to County Road W 650 S over Big Bayou Creek. 38°15′30″N 87°52′45″W	Griffin vicinity	
7	Patoka Bridges Historic District	Patoka Bridges Historic District	March 25, 2005 (#05000198)	Along County Road 1250 E spanning the Patoka River, north of Oakland City; 38°22′52″N 87°20′22″W	Columbia Township	Extends into Pike County
8	Patoka Church of God in Christ-Patoka Colored School		November 21, 2022 (#100008411)	309 South Wood St. 38°24′09″N 87°35′22″W	Patoka	
9	Princeton Courthouse Square Historic District	Princeton Courthouse Square Historic District	May 20, 2025 (#100011868)	Roughly bounded by State and Water Streets on the north and south, and Prince and West Streets on the east and west. 38°21′19″N 87°34′06″W	Princeton	
10	Princeton Westside Historic District		May 20, 2025 (#100011869)	State Street and the north side of Broadway between Hall Street on the east and the former Southern Railroad on the west 38°21′23″N 87°34′23″W	Princeton	
11	Trippett-Glaze-Duncan-Kolb Farm	Trippett-Glaze-Duncan-Kolb Farm	May 28, 1993 (#93000470)	State Road 65 east of Patoka; also the Kolb Farm, located along State Road 65 east of Patoka; 38°24′15″N 87°31′45″W	Washington Township	The Kolb Farm represents a boundary increase of December 28, 2009
12	Weber Village Archaeological Site (12 Gi 13)	Weber Village Archaeological Site (12 Gi 13)	September 12, 1985 (#85002131)	North central portion of Section 18, about 0.25 miles (0.40 km) west of Skelton; 38°20′36″N 87°47′29″W	Montgomery Township	
13	Welborn-Ross House	Welborn-Ross House	March 14, 1996 (#96000287)	542 S. Hart St. 38°21′01″N 87°34′06″W	Princeton	
14	Wheeling Covered Bridge	Wheeling Covered Bridge	May 27, 2026 (#100013075)	Adjacent to County Road E 390 N over the Patoka River. 38°24′44″N 87°27′26″W	Wheeling vicinity	

== See also ==
- List of National Historic Landmarks in Indiana
- National Register of Historic Places listings in Indiana
- Listings in neighboring counties: Edwards (IL), Knox, Pike, Posey, Vanderburgh, Wabash (IL), Warrick, White (IL)
- List of Indiana state historical markers in Gibson County
