= Evansville and Crawfordsville Railroad =

Railroad company

- Evansville and Terre Haute Railroad

Overview
- Founders: William D. Griswold; Chauncey Rose
- Locale: Southwest Indiana
- Dates of operation: 1853–1877
- Successor: Chicago & Eastern Illinois Railroad

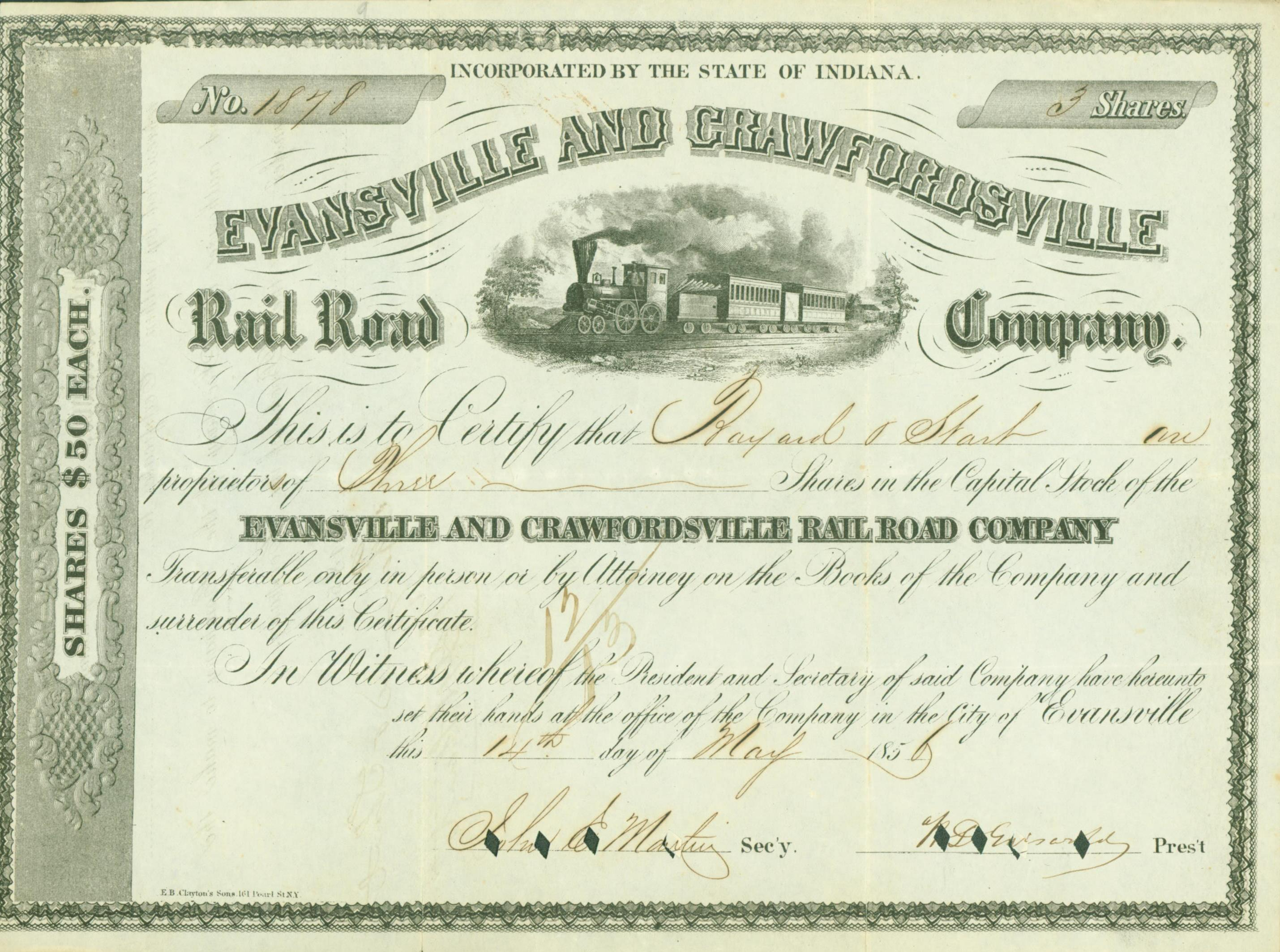
Share of the Evansville and Crawfordsville Rail Road Company, issued May 14, 1856

The Evansville and Crawfordsville Railroad Company (E&CR) was Evansville, Indiana's first railroad company. It had a 160 miles (260 km) long railway that connected those two places. It was renamed Evansville and Terre Haute Railroad in 1877. It went on to be consolidated with other railroads of the region into the Chicago & Eastern Illinois Railroad.

== Initial incorporation and charters ==
The railroad was originally chartered by an Act of the Indiana legislature on January 2, 1849, as the Evansville and Illinois Railroad Company (E&IR) to connect Evansville with the Ohio & Mississippi Railroad at Olney, Illinois via Princeton. This was amended on January 21, 1850, to extend the railway from Princeton to Vincennes instead, and to remove the authorisation to build to Mt Carmel, Illinois. A separate Wabash Railroad Company had been chartered to build a railroad from Vincennes to Crawfordsville, but it was merged into the E&IR on November 8, 1852, and the company name was changed by Act of the state legislature, authorising the merger, to finally become just the E&CR on March 4, 1853.

== Route and construction ==
Section 1 of the railroad was the 51 miles (82 km) route from Evansville to Vincennes, built at an accumulated cost of US$847,191 (equivalent to $30,357,677 in 2025) as reported in 1854 by its president Samuel Hall. Section 2 of the railroad then went from Vincennes to Terre Haute, a route of 58 miles (93 km). Section 3 of the railroad then extended from Terre Haute to Rockville, and Crawfordsville, for a further 51 miles (82 km).

Section 2, from Vincennes to Terre Haute, was built under William D. Griswold and Chauncey Rose, was opened to through traffic on November 23, 1853, and completed in 1854. Rose donated his stock in the Terre Haute & Indianapolis Railroad to the Evansville and Crawfordsville to finance its construction.

Section 3 was built under the presidency of John Ingle Jr (for more on whom see Inglefield, Indiana). In 1854 there was a plan to proceed onwards past Crawfordsville to Fort Wayne. The Rockville to Crawfordsville section was extended under a June 2, 1869, charter as the Evansville, Terre Haute, and Chicago Railroad Company, to extend to a total distance from Rockville of 55 miles (89 km) to Danville, Illinois, under the presidency of Josephus Collett. This was completed by 1872.

== Stops ==
Former 19th-century stops on the railroad were:

- Field's Station
- Petersburg Road
- McIntire's
- Rockville, (39°45′43″N 87°13′23″W) 23 miles (37 km) north by east of Terre Haute
- Rosedale, (39°37′37″N 87°16′55″W) 10 miles (16 km) south of Rockville
- Otter Creek, (39°32′49″N 87°20′53″W) 5 miles (8.0 km) from Terre Haute
- Terre Haute, 109 miles (175 km) from Evansville
- Hartford, 11 miles (18 km) south of Terre Haute
- Farmersburg, (39°14′53″N 87°23′20″W) 11 miles (18 km) from Sullivan and 15 miles (24 km) from Terre Haute
- Ascension, 11 miles (18 km) from Sullivan and 16 miles (26 km) from Terre Haute and the post-office for Farmersburgh
- Currysville (later Curryville), (39°11′28″N 87°23′28″W) 19 miles (31 km) from Terre Haute
- Sullivan, (39°06′04″N 87°24′11″W) 26 miles (42 km) from Terre Haute and 82 miles (132 km) from Evansville
- Paxton's (later Paxton), (39°01′12″N 87°23′35″W) 32 miles (51 km) south of Terre Haute
- Carlisle, 10 miles (16 km) south of Sullivan and 73 miles (117 km) from Evansville
- Oaktown (38°52′16″N 87°26′24″W) 15 miles (24 km) north of Vincennes and 66 miles (106 km) from Evansville, also known as Oak Station
- Emison also known as Emerson,(38°48′18″N 87°27′25″W) 10 miles (16 km) north of Vincennes
- Vincennes (38°40′55″N 87°31′01″W) 56 miles (90 km) north of Evansville and which was previously on the Evansville and Illinois Railroad
- Purcell's, (38°35′44″N 87°31′09″W) 6 miles (9.7 km) south of Vincennes, which served the farms surrounding the then hamlet of Saint Thomas (38°35′10″N 87°33′44″W) and was situated on one such farm owned by Andrew Purcell after whom it was named.
- Decker (38°31′08″N 87°31′37″W) 11 miles (18 km) south of Vincennes, formerly known as Decker's Station and Deckertown, serving both Johnson and Decker Townships
- Miller's, 33 miles (53 km) north of Evansville
- Hazleton, (38°29′35″N 87°32′10″W) 10 miles (16 km) north of Princeton and 38 miles (61 km) from Evansville
- Patoka, (38°24′00″N 87°35′17″W) 4 miles (6.4 km) north of Princeton and 31 miles (50 km) from Evansville
- Princeton, (38°21′22″N 87°34′30″W) 27 miles (43 km) north of Evansville
- King's (later King), (38°18′18″N 87°34′26″W) 24 miles (39 km) north of Evansville
- LaGrange, 20 miles (32 km) north of Evansville
- Fort Branch, (38°14′46″N 87°34′44″W) 7 miles (11 km) south of Princeton and 20 miles (32 km) from Evansville
- Haubstadt, (38°12′22″N 87°34′23″W) 10 miles (16 km) south of Princeton and 17 miles (27 km) north of Evansville
- Saint James, (38°10′55″N 87°34′16″W) 15 miles (24 km) north of Evansville
- Nash Depot, 13 miles (21 km) north of Evansville
- Ingles (later Inglefield), (38°06′32″N 87°33′29″W) 10 miles (16 km) north of Evansville, a post-office run by John Ingles Sr the father of John Ingles Jr
- Erskine, (38°02′35″N 87°32′28″W) 5 miles (8.0 km) north of Evansville
- Evansville, terminus and 109 miles (175 km) from Terre Haute
