= Saint Thomas, Indiana =

Former hamlet in Knox County, Indiana, US

St Thomas
- former hamlet
- Interactive map of St Thomas
- Coordinates: 38°35′10″N 87°33′44″W
- Country: United States
- State: Indiana
- County: Knox

Saint Thomas was a hamlet in Johnson Township, Knox County, Indiana, in the United States. It had an eponymous Catholic church, and a Benedictine convent which also provided a school.

== The Purcell family and melon farming ==
On farms surrounding the hamlet, the major crop in the 19th century was melons, which were shipped out via the nearby Purcell's Station (38°35′44″N 87°31′09″W), located 6 miles (9.7 km) south of Vincennes on the Evansville & Terre Haute Railroad . There were also once grain elevators at the station. Purcell's was also the post-office serving St. Thomas, and local merchant Lease Werker was its postmaster back at the turn of the 20th century.

The Purcells were an early family of European farming settlers starting with Isaac Purcell who came to Knox county from Virginia somewhere around 1790, and Jonathan Purcell. Jonathan was the father of John Purcell who was the father of Noah Purcell, whose farm was next to Isaac's farm. Andrew Purcell's farm was the location of the Purcell's Station railroad stop and post-office, and it is Andrew for whom the station was named. Andrew had a water mill and a still house, as had Noah.

== Dicksburg ==
Andrew Purcell originally owned the land that was sold to Thomas Dick on 1836-12-01, that would be the site of the failed town of Dicksburg to the south of St Thomas, in adjoining Decker Township in Donations 6 and 7 (roughly 38°30′29″N 87°33′00″W). Thomas Dick was a relative of James A. Dick, after whom the Dick's Hills also in Decker Township (38°30′22″N 87°33′58″W) were named. The town was located downstream of Deckertown (nowadays Decker) on the north bank of West Fork White River, 14 miles (23 km) south of Vincennes.

Amongst the owners of lots there was Isaac Purcell. But only half of the 93 lots of the planned town were ever sold, and the entire town was washed away when the White River flooded. By 1875 there was a graveyard at the site of the former town, which itself also ended up being washed away in another flood.
