= National Register of Historic Places listings in Pike County, Indiana =

Location of Pike County in Indiana

This is a list of the National Register of Historic Places listings in Pike County, Indiana.

This is intended to be a complete list of the properties and districts on the National Register of Historic Places in Pike County, Indiana, United States. Latitude and longitude coordinates are provided for many National Register properties and districts; these locations may be seen together in a map.

There are three properties and districts listed on the National Register in the county.

Properties and districts located in incorporated areas display the name of the municipality, while properties and districts in unincorporated areas display the name of their civil township. Properties and districts split between multiple jurisdictions display the names of all jurisdictions.

This National Park Service list is complete through NPS recent listings posted August 22, 2025.

== Current listings ==
	Name on the Register	Image	Date listed	Location	City or town	Description
1	Palace Lodge	Palace Lodge	February 23, 1984 (#84001217)	Center and Main Sts. 38°22′58″N 87°12′57″W	Winslow	
2	Patoka Bridges Historic District	Patoka Bridges Historic District	March 25, 2005 (#05000198)	Along County Road 300 W spanning the Patoka River, north of Oakland City; 38°22′52″N 87°20′22″W	Logan Township	Extends into Gibson County
3	Pike County Courthouse	Pike County Courthouse	September 17, 2008 (#08000913)	801 Main St. 38°29′30″N 87°16′44″W	Petersburg	

== See also ==
- List of National Historic Landmarks in Indiana
- National Register of Historic Places listings in Indiana
- Listings in neighboring counties: Daviess, Dubois, Gibson, Knox, Warrick
- List of Indiana state historical markers in Pike County
