= White River Township, Gibson County, Indiana =

White River Township Gibson County
- Township
- Location within Gibson County
- Coordinates: 38°26′10″N 87°36′37″W
- Country: United States
- State: Indiana
- County: Gibson
- School District: North Gibson School Corporation
- Named for: White River

Government
  - Type: Indiana township
  - Trustee: Kim Minkler

Area
  - Total: 49.04 sq mi (127.0 km^{2})
  - Land: 47.4 sq mi (123 km^{2})
  - Water: 1.63 sq mi (4.2 km^{2})
- Elevation: 400 ft (122 m)

Population (2020)
  - Total: 1,472
  - Density: 31.1/sq mi (12.0/km^{2})
- Time zone: UTC-6 (CST)
  - Summer (DST): UTC-5 (CDT)
- ZIP codes: 47649, 47666, 47670
- Area code: 812
- FIPS code: 18-83888
- GNIS feature ID: 454053

White River Township is one of ten townships in Gibson County, Indiana. As of the 2020 census, its population was 1,472 (down from 1,689 at 2010) and it contained 723 housing units.

It took its name from the White River.

Historical population
Census	Pop.	Note	%±
1890	2,692		—
1900	2,934		9.0%
1910	2,602		−11.3%
1920	2,469		−5.1%
1930	2,124		−14.0%
1940	2,010		−5.4%
1950	1,888		−6.1%
1960	1,757		−6.9%
1970	1,392		−20.8%
1980	1,959		40.7%
1990	1,902		−2.9%
2000	1,714		−9.9%
2010	1,689		−1.5%
2020	1,472		−12.8%
Source: US Decennial Census

== Geography ==
According to the 2010 census, the township has a total area of 49.04 square miles (127.0 km^{2}), of which 47.4 square miles (123 km^{2}) (or 96.66%) is land and 1.63 square miles (4.2 km^{2}) (or 3.32%) is water.

=== Cities and towns ===
- Hazleton
- Patoka

=== Unincorporated towns ===
- East Mount Carmel

(This list is based on USGS data and may include former settlements.)

=== Adjacent townships ===
Gibson County

- Washington Township (east)
- Patoka Township (south)
- Montgomery Township (southwest)

Knox County

- Decker Township (northwest)
- Johnson Township (northeast)

Wabash County, IL

- Mt. Carmel Precinct (west)

=== Cemeteries ===
The township contains eight cemeteries: Barnett, Decker Chapel, Field, Humphrey, Milburn, Morrison, Robb and Trippet.

=== Major highways ===
- U.S. Route 41
- State Road 56
- State Road 64

=== Airports and landing strips ===
- Hull Airport

== Education ==
White River Township is served by the North Gibson School Corporation, and like neighboring Washington Township also has no schools of its own since the early 1970s.

Prior to 1963, Hazleton High School and Patoka High School had students from the township. That year, those two schools merged into White River High School, which had the school colors as red, white, and blue and the mascots as the Little Giants. In 1965, that school in turn merged into Princeton Community High School. Nathan Blackford of Evansville Living described White River High as "Possibly the shortest-lived high school of the consolidation era" as many school districts and schools in 1960s Indiana were merging with one another.
