= East Mount Carmel, Indiana =

- Unincorporated community
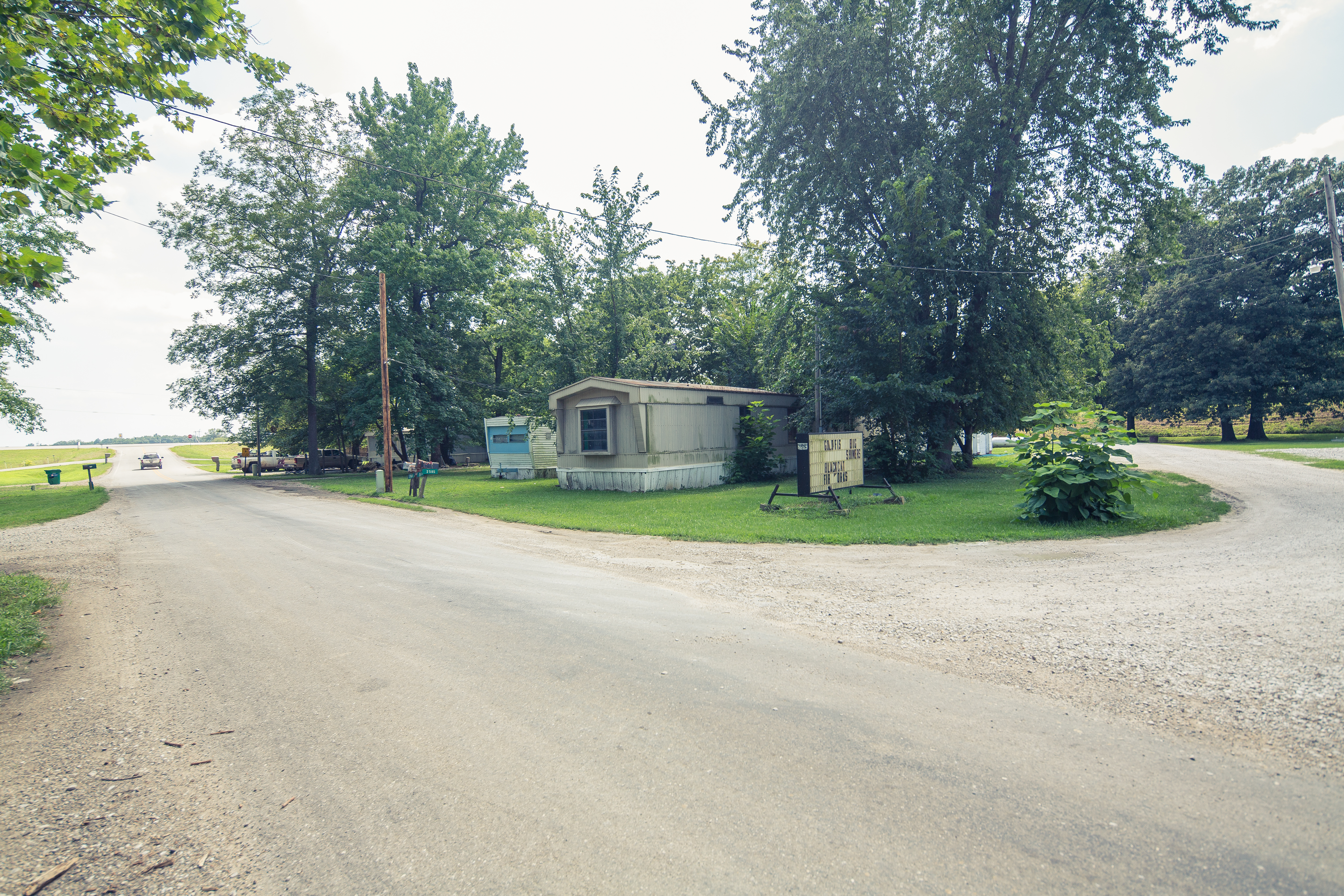

- Location within Indiana Location within the United States
- Coordinates: 38°23′36″N 87°44′41″W
- Country: United States
- State: Indiana
- County: Gibson
- Township: White River
- Elevation: 390 ft (120 m)
- ZIP code: 47665
- FIPS code: 18-19918
- GNIS feature ID: 433922

East Mount Carmel is a small unincorporated community near the southwestern corner of White River Township in Gibson County, Indiana. The community is home to around 50 people.

== History ==
East Mount Carmel was founded in ca. 1885. It lies east of Mount Carmel, Illinois, hence the name.

The post office which East Mount Carmel once contained was called Fetters due to the similarity of the village's name to Carmel, Indiana. The Fetters post office operated from 1897 until 1907.

== Geography ==
East Mount Carmel is located at 38°23′36″N 87°44′41″W, immediately across the Wabash River from Mount Carmel, Illinois. The Patoka River meets the Wabash just north of the community, and the Gibson Generating Station complex surrounds the community to the south and east.
