= List of Indiana state historical markers in Pike County =

Location of Pike County in Indiana

This is a list of the Indiana state historical markers in Pike County.

This is intended to be a complete list of the official state historical markers placed in Pike County, Indiana, United States by the Indiana Historical Bureau. The locations of the historical markers and their latitude and longitude coordinates are included below when available, along with their names, years of placement, and topics as recorded by the Historical Bureau. There are 3 historical markers located in Pike County.

== Historical markers ==
Marker title	Image	Year placed	Location	Topics
The Buffalo Trace		1966	Southeastern corner of the Gray Memorial Bridge carrying State Road 61 over the White River near Petersburg; 38°30′32.6″N 87°17′16″W	Nature and Natural Disasters, Transportation
Wabash and Erie Canal Completed 1853		1976	Western side of State Road 57 between the bridges over the Patoka River and the South Fork Patoka River; 38°22′50″N 87°20′6″W	Transportation, Business, Industry, and Labor
Wabash and Erie Canal		1992	Northern side of 108 W. Main Street in Petersburg; 38°29′18.8″N 87°17′3.3″W	Transportation, Business, Industry, and Labor

== See also ==
- List of Indiana state historical markers
- National Register of Historic Places listings in Pike County, Indiana
