= Washington Township, Gibson County, Indiana =

Washington Township Gibson County
- Township
- Location within Gibson County
- Coordinates: 38°26′41″N 87°28′21″W
- Country: United States
- State: Indiana
- County: Gibson
- Township Seat: (None); Patoka in White River Township serves as seat.
- School District: North Gibson School Corporation
- Named for: George Washington

Government
  - Type: Indiana township
  - Trustee: Tony Shroeder

Area
  - Total: 36.79 sq mi (95.3 km^{2})
  - Land: 36.34 sq mi (94.1 km^{2})
  - Water: 0.44 sq mi (1.1 km^{2})
- Elevation: 499 ft (152 m)

Population (2020)
  - Total: 731
  - Density: 20.1/sq mi (7.77/km^{2})
- Time zone: UTC-6 (CST)
  - Summer (DST): UTC-5 (CDT)
- ZIP codes: 47567, 47640, 47649, 47666, 47670
- Area code: 812
- FIPS code: 18-80612
- GNIS feature ID: 453995
- Washington Township is one of two townships in Gibson County that has no Zip Code or Township Seat. Although Oatsville, on the county line with Pike County has its own code.

Washington Township is one of ten townships in Gibson County, Indiana. As of the 2020 census, its population was 731 (down from 785 at 2010) and it contained 326 housing units. Like Wabash Township, Washington Township also has no organized seat within the township, despite its two corporation-worthy towns Mount Olympus and Wheeling. Patoka, in White River Township, serves as the seat.

Washington Township was organized in 1824, and named for President George Washington.

Historical population
Census	Pop.	Note	%±
1890	1,576		—
1900	1,904		20.8%
1910	1,546		−18.8%
1920	1,503		−2.8%
1930	1,378		−8.3%
1940	1,260		−8.6%
1950	1,013		−19.6%
1960	816		−19.4%
1970	698		−14.5%
1980	718		2.9%
1990	714		−0.6%
2000	703		−1.5%
2010	785		11.7%
2020	731		−6.9%
Source: US Decennial Census

== History ==
The Trippett-Glaze-Duncan-Kolb Farm was listed on the National Register of Historic Places in 1993, with a boundary increase in 2009.

== Geography ==
According to the 2010 census, the township has a total area of 36.79 square miles (95.3 km^{2}), of which 36.34 square miles (94.1 km^{2}) (or 98.78%) is land and 0.44 square miles (1.1 km^{2}) (or 1.20%) is water.

== Point of Interest ==
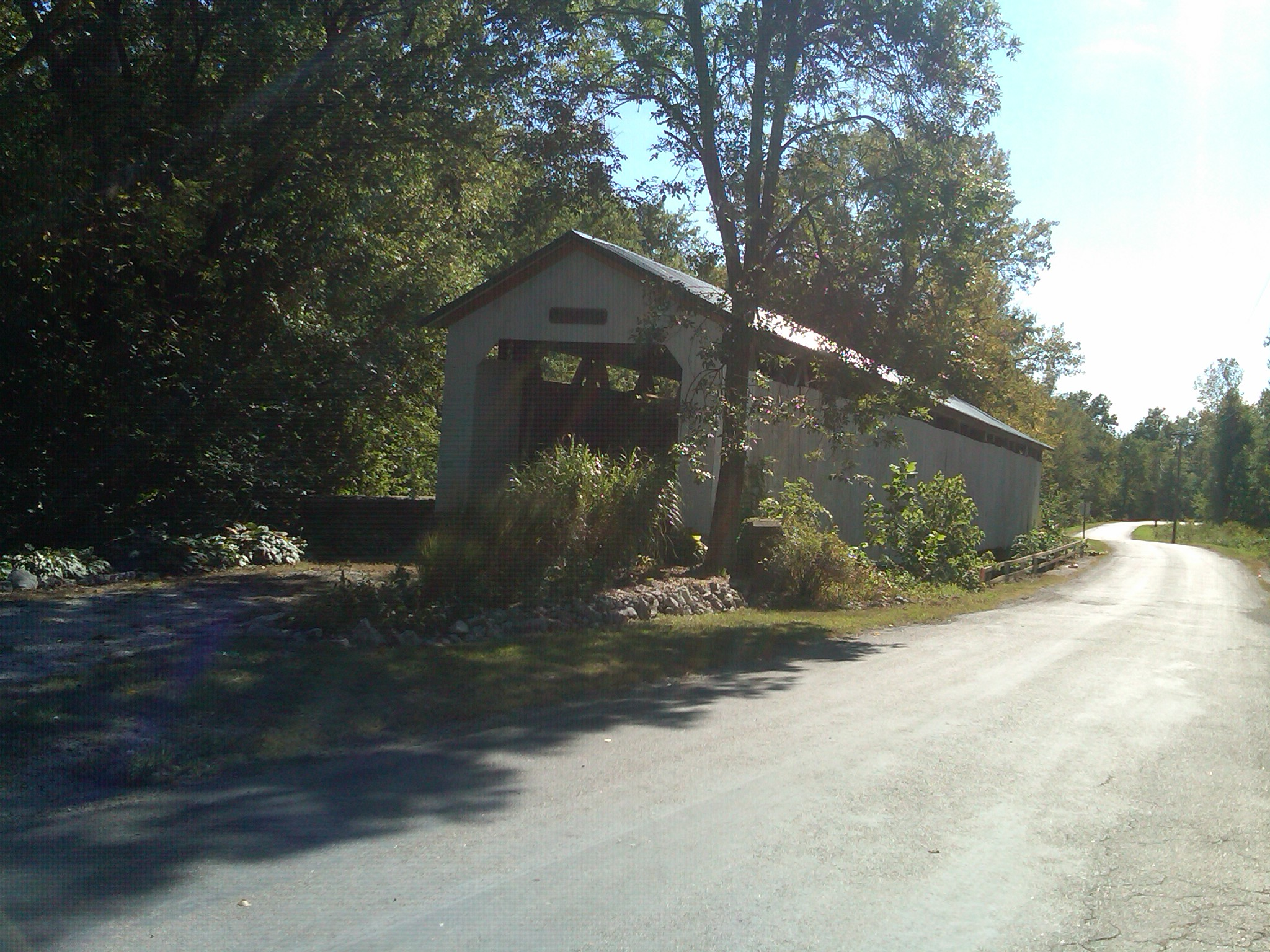
Wheeling Covered Bridge

=== Unincorporated towns ===
- Giro (Buena Vista)
- Mount Olympus
- Oatsville
- Wheeling

=== Adjacent townships ===
Gibson County

- Center Township (south)
- Patoka Township (southwest)
- White River Township (west)

Knox County

- Johnson Township (north)

Pike County

- Clay Township (northeast)
- Logan Township (east)

=== Cemeteries ===
The township contains five cemeteries: Armstrong, Kirk, Kirk-McRoberts, Phillips and Richardson.

=== Major highways ===
- Indiana State Road 56
- Indiana State Road 65

== Education ==
Washington Township is served by the North Gibson School Corporation although not having any schools of its own since the early 1970s.
