= Patoka River National Wildlife Refuge and Management Area =

Collection of wildlife refuges in Indiana, US

Patoka River National Wildlife Refuge
- IUCN category IV (habitat/species management area)
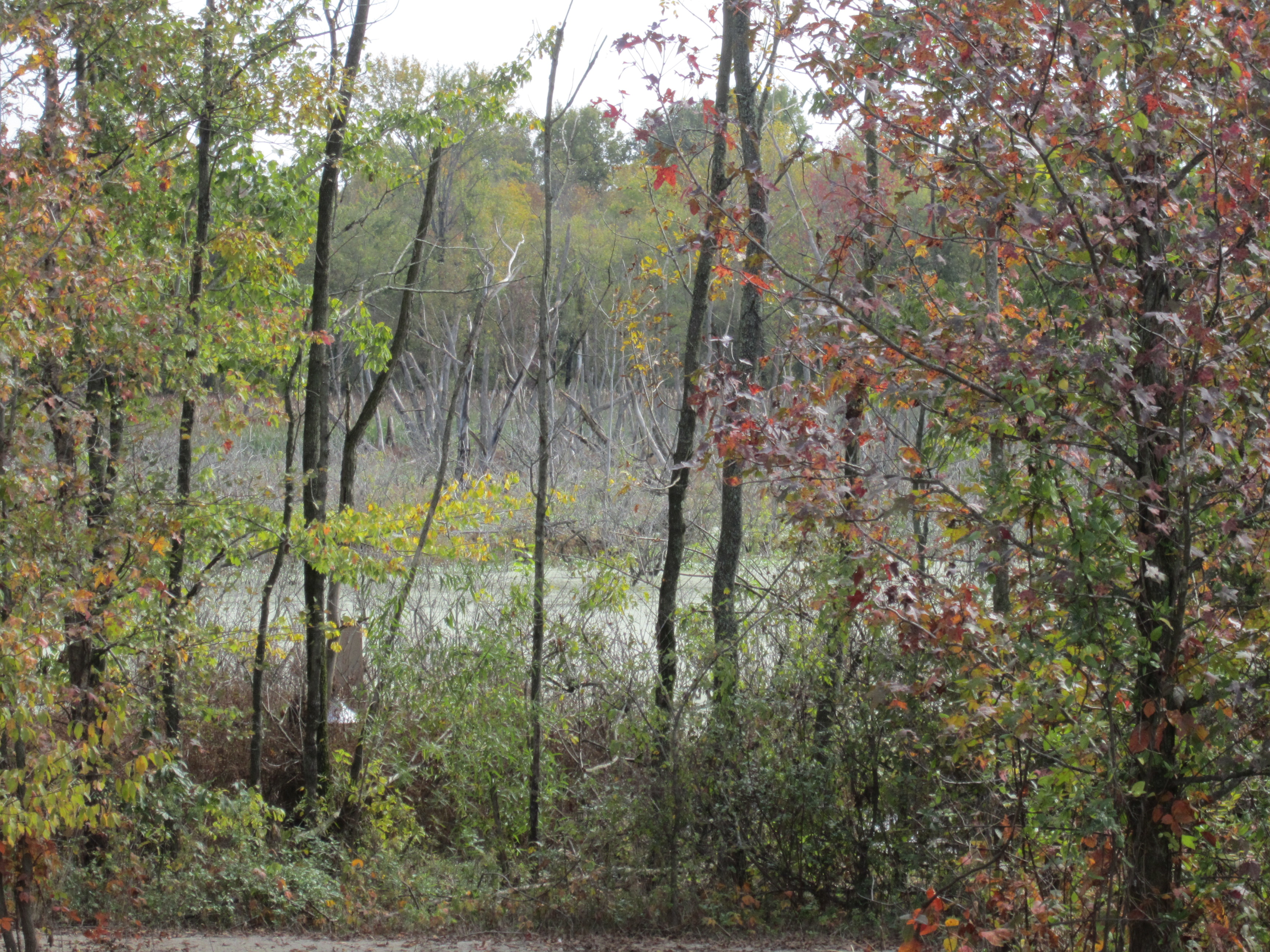

- Location within the United States
- Location: Gibson and Pike Counties, Indiana, United States
- Nearest city: Francisco, Indiana; Oakland City, Indiana; Winslow, Indiana
- Coordinates: 38°22′00″N 87°18′00″W
- Area: 23,962 acres (96.97 km^{2})
- Established: 1994
- Governing body: U.S. Fish and Wildlife Service
- Website: Patoka River National Wildlife Refuge and Management Area

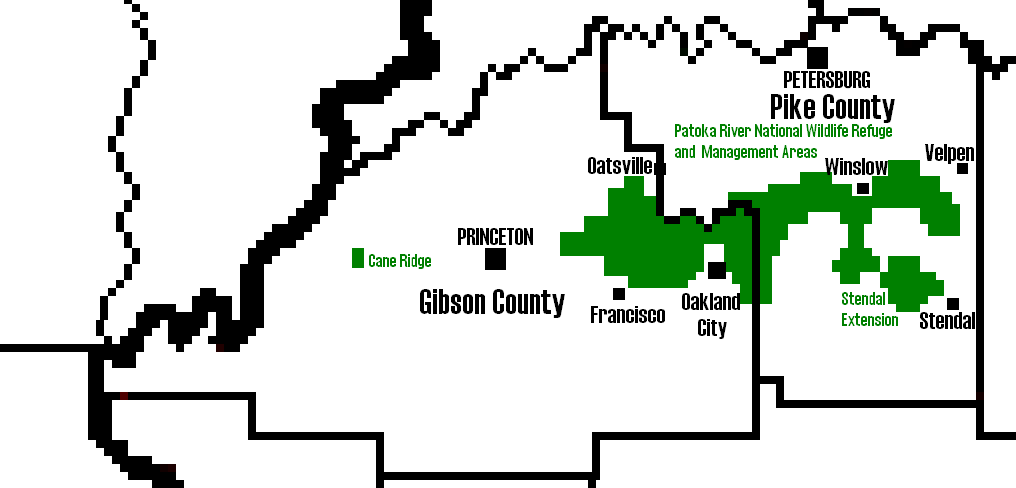
The Patoka River National Wildlife Refuge and Management Areas located within Gibson and Pike Counties

The Patoka River National Wildlife Refuge and Management Area, established in 1994, is a collection of wildlife refuges and habitats situated along the Patoka River in Gibson and Pike counties in southwestern Indiana. It consists mostly of the main body refuge along nearly 40 miles (64 km) of the river's course from just north of Francisco, Indiana, to just west of Velpen, Indiana. Other areas include the Cane Ridge Wildlife Management Area managed by Duke Energy and located immediately south of Gibson Lake and the Gibson Generating Station in northwestern Gibson County, 9 miles (14 km) east of the main body. The refuge is authorized for 23,962 acres (96.97 km^{2}). As of 2010, 6,149 acres (24.88 km^{2}) are owned by the U.S. Fish and Wildlife Service.

Many species of birds nest or spend the winter in these areas, including the bald eagle and endangered least tern.

In 2012, tier 1 of the Interstate 69 Project was built through this area immediately west of Oakland City in the strip long been set aside when the original Interstate was built, using a 1.5-mile-long (2.4 km) bridge to lessen the environmental impact. Originally Interstate 69 was to go along a route similar to the current construction route. This has prompted some disturbances by the group Earth First!, including "evicting" the project offices in Oakland City.

== See also ==
- Patoka Lake
