= Vertus Hardiman =

American victim of radiation experiments

Vertus Wellborn Hardiman (March 9, 1922 – June 1, 2007) was a victim of a US government human radiation experiment at the age of five that left him with a painful skull deformity that forced him to cover his head for 80 years. His case has been cited as an example of medical racism.

== Life ==
Hardiman was born in Lyles Station, Indiana and attended Lyles Consolidated School. In 1927, he and nine other children, all from Lyles Consolidated School, were severely irradiated during a medical experiment conducted at the local county hospital. To get parental consent the experiment was misrepresented as a new therapy for the scalp fungus known as ringworm.

The school children from Lyles Station School were delivered by their schoolbus, including Hardiman who was only five years old at the time and not technically enrolled in school. His mother sent him with his older brother to receive what they had been told was treatment for ringworm. All of the children treated with the radiation complained of the same symptoms: they all experienced headaches, suffered from dizziness, and felt extreme burning of the scalp. Eventually all the children lost their hair permanently.

Many of the children suffered long-term effects, but Hardiman's were the most pronounced. The radiation disfigured his head and left a large, open wound on the side of his skull. He hid his disfigurement by wearing a wig or a beanie.

The parents of the children met with a local lawyer and filed a lawsuit against the hospital, emphasizing how the parents had been misled and tricked, but the hospital was found not liable. Hardiman, who was African-American, believed the experiment was racially motivated. His case has been cited as an example of medical racism. Despite his conditions, Hardiman harbored no anger and rarely complained, stating, "If you’re angry, that means your heart’s not right."

In 1945 Hardiman traveled to California. In 1946 he worked for the County of Los Angeles General Hospital, where he was honored for his perfect attendance. He lived his last years in Altadena, California and died at age 85, after his wound became cancerous.

Hardiman's life is the subject of a documentary, Hole in the Head: A Life Revealed, released in 2011 that was written and produced by Wilbert Smith and directed by Brett Leonard.
