= Sandersville =

Sandersville may refer to:

- Sandersville, Georgia
- Sandersville, Mississippi
- Inglefield, Indiana, also known as Sandersville
