= List of Indiana state historical markers in Gibson County =

Location of Gibson County in Indiana

This is a list of the Indiana state historical markers in Gibson County.

This is intended to be a complete list of the official state historical markers placed in Gibson County, Indiana, United States by the Indiana Historical Bureau. The locations of the historical markers and their latitude and longitude coordinates are included below when available, along with their names, years of placement, and topics as recorded by the Historical Bureau. There are 5 historical markers located in Gibson County.

== Historical markers ==
| Marker title | Image | Year placed | Location | Topics |
|---|---|---|---|---|
| Lyles Station | | 2002 | Along County Road 500W near its junction with County Road 100N in front of the restored Lyles Consolidated School, 1 mile north of the junction of State Roads 64 and 65, 5 miles west of Princeton; 38°22′11″N 87°39′36″W | African American, Historic District, Neighborhoods, and Towns |
| James Washington Cockrum | | 2005 | 411 W. Oak St. in Oakland City; 38°20′16″N 87°21′0″W | Underground Railroad, African American |
| Black Civil War Substitutes | | 2015 | Bicentennial Park, State St. and West St., Princeton; 38°21′20″N 87°34′12″W | |
| Melba Newell Phillips | | 2019 | Oakland City University near 138 N. Lucretia St., Oakland City; 38°20′21″N 87°21′7″W | Science, Education |
| Aaron Richard Fisher | | 2022 | Lyles Station Historic School & Museum at 953 County Rd 500 W, Princeton; 38°22′10″N 87°39′33″W | Military, African American |

== See also ==
- List of Indiana state historical markers
- National Register of Historic Places listings in Gibson County, Indiana
