= Gibson Generating Station =

Coal-fired power station in Gibson County, Indiana

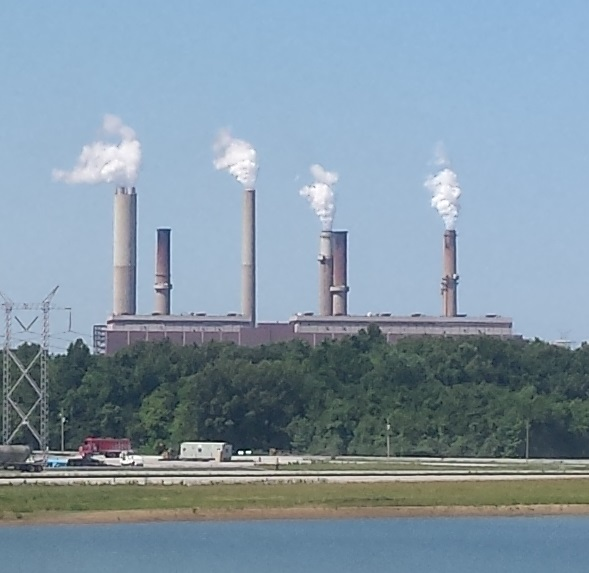
- Gibson Generating Station as it appeared from Indiana 64 in 2016. The power plant is often still referred to by locals as PSI, in reference to its original owner, Public Service Indiana, even when it was owned by Cinergy. The plant's two new 620 ft (190 m) smokestacks are seen in the back, behind its three original 550 ft (170 m) stacks. All six stacks are shown. As of January 2018, the two stacks on the left foreground are no longer visible from any vantage point.
- Country: United States
- Location: Montgomery Township, Gibson County, near Owensville, Indiana and Mount Carmel, Illinois
- Coordinates: 38°22′19″N 87°46′02″W
- Status: Operational
- Commission date: 1976–82 under Public Service Indiana
- Decommission date: 2037-2041 (planned)
- Owners: Duke Energy Indiana (2006–present); Cinergy (1995–2006); Public Service Indiana (1971–1995)

Thermal power station
- Primary fuel: Pulverized coal
- Turbine technology: Steam Turbine
- Cooling source: Gibson Lake

Power generation
- Units operational: 5 General Electric 705 MWg turbines
- Nameplate capacity: 3,132 MW

The Gibson Generating Station is a coal-burning power plant located at the northernmost end of Montgomery Township, Gibson County, Indiana, United States. It is close to the Wabash River, 1.5 miles (2.5 km) southeast of Mount Carmel, Illinois, 2 miles (3.2 km) south of the mouth of the Patoka River, and 4 miles (6.5 km) south of the mouth of the White River. The closest Indiana communities are Owensville 7.5 miles (12 km) to the southeast of the plant, and Princeton, 10.5 miles (17 km) to the east. With a 2013 aggregate output capacity among its five units of 3,345 megawatts, it is the largest power plant run by Duke Energy, and the tenth-largest electrical plant in the United States. Given the closure of the Nanticoke Generating Station in Ontario, in 2013, the Gibson Generating Station became the largest coal power plant in North America by generated power.

Also on the grounds of the facility is a 3,000-acre (12 km^{2}) large man-made lake called Gibson Lake which is used as a cooling pond for the plant. Neighboring the plant is a Duke-owned, publicly accessible access point to the Wabash River near a small island that acts as a wildlife preserve. This is the nearest boat-ramp to Mount Carmel on the Indiana side of the river. Located immediately south of Gibson Lake, the plant's cooling pond, is the Cane Ridge National Wildlife Refuge, the newest unit of the Patoka River National Wildlife Refuge and Management Area. Opened in August 2006, this 26-acre (11 ha) area serves as a nesting ground for the least tern. Cane Ridge NWR is reportedly the easternmost nesting ground for the bird in the U.S.

The Gibson Generating Station is connected to the power grid via five 345 kV and one 138 kV transmission lines to 79 Indiana counties including the Indianapolis area and a sixth 345 kV line running from GGS to Evansville and Henderson, owned by Vectren and Kenergy.

== History ==
The Gibson Generating Station was originally built as a two-unit coal-fired power plant in 1972 by Public Service Indiana (PSI) with initial plans to build 8 units. The 1970s saw the addition of Units 3, 4. However, environmental regulations prevented the construction of the two remaining additional units in the original plan. In 1982, Unit 5 was constructed, and two more stacks were added. In the 1990s, number 4 was separated from number 3's stack, and each was given its own stack, while Units 1 and 2 continued to share a stack.

Cinergy took over PSI in 1995. After the merger, all five units were fitted with new Selective catalytic reduction (SCR) equipment, mounted on the back of each unit. During this construction, one of the largest cranes in the world was erected at Gibson Station. Despite this, the station only had 4 stacks for 5 units. Units 1 & 2 still shared a single flue stack and Unit 3 was still using the old 3 & 4 stack. (These are the two darker smokestacks in the above photograph. Both of these stacks have since been removed bringing the number of visible stacks back down to four).

Duke Energy took over Cinergy in May 2006.

== Changes and Upgrades ==
A new common stack with independent flues 620 ft (190 m) was constructed for units 1 & 2 and a single new stack was built for unit 3 as part of installation of wet FGD systems on these units. In 2017 the abandoned stacks were demolished, thereby leaving four standing.

A series of SCR units have been installed to decrease its NOx emissions. These improvements were completed in 2008, with Unit 5 being the last.

Wet FGD (Flue Gas Desulfurization) systems have been retrofitted to units 1–4. Emissions from the station are considered to be fully scrubbed.

== Unit information ==
Gibson Generating Station, Owensville, IN Complex Area: 6.1 mi^{2} (16 km^{2})
	Unit 1 Fully Owned	Unit 2 Fully Owned	Unit 3 Fully Owned	Unit 4 Fully Owned	Unit 5 Franchised	Plant-Wide
Rated Summer Net Power Output (MW)	630	630	630	622	620	3,132 MW
Commercial Overhauled	1974; 2007	1975; 2007	1977; 2005	1978; 2009	1982; 2008	Major maintenance performed during low demand periods in the Fall and Spring.
Ownership	Duke Energy 100%	Duke Energy 100%	Duke Energy 100%	Duke Energy 100%	Duke Energy 51% Wabash Vly. P.A. 24.5% Indiana Mun. P. A. 24.5%	Duke Energy 90.3% W.V.P.A. 4.87% I.M.P.A. 4.87%

== Earthquake effects ==
At 4:37:00am CDT (9:37:00 UTC) on April 18, 2008, a 5.4 M_{w} earthquake rocked the area with a maximum Mercalli intensity of VII (Very strong). The epicenter was located 7 miles (11 km) northwest of the station in nearby Wabash County, Illinois. Some minor damage was recorded but the only visible effect was that Gibson Generating Station's Unit 4 deactivated itself because of its vibration detectors.

== Environmental concerns ==
- The lake was closed for fishing in 2006 due to high selenium levels.
- In April 2006, Unit 4 accidentally released a blue haze that floated for a time over Mount Carmel, as emissions of sulfuric acid descended on the town, aggravating respiratory illnesses and prompting an investigation by the Illinois Environmental Protection Agency.
- There have been undocumented concerns voiced as recently as September 2007 that the plant's ash disposal pits have been leaking boron into the water tables of the area.

== See also ==
- List of largest power stations in the United States
- List of generating stations in Indiana
