= Giro, Indiana =

Buena Vista (Giro)
- Unincorporated community
- Location within Indiana Location within the United States
- Coordinates: 38°30′40″N 87°28′15″W
- Country: United States
- State: Indiana
- County: Gibson
- Township: Washington
- Elevation: 446 ft (136 m)
- ZIP code: 47640
- FIPS code: 18-27810
- GNIS feature ID: 435091

Giro is an unincorporated community located at the northernmost point of Gibson County in Washington Township, Gibson County, Indiana. The town is also known as Buena Vista.

== History ==
It was platted in 1848 as Buena Vista. The Giro post office was discontinued in 1907.

== Geography ==
Giro is located at 38°30′40″N 87°28′15″W.
