= Trippett–Glaze–Duncan–Kolb Farm =

- Trippett–Glaze–Duncan-Kolb Farm
- U.S. National Register of Historic Places
- U.S. Historic district
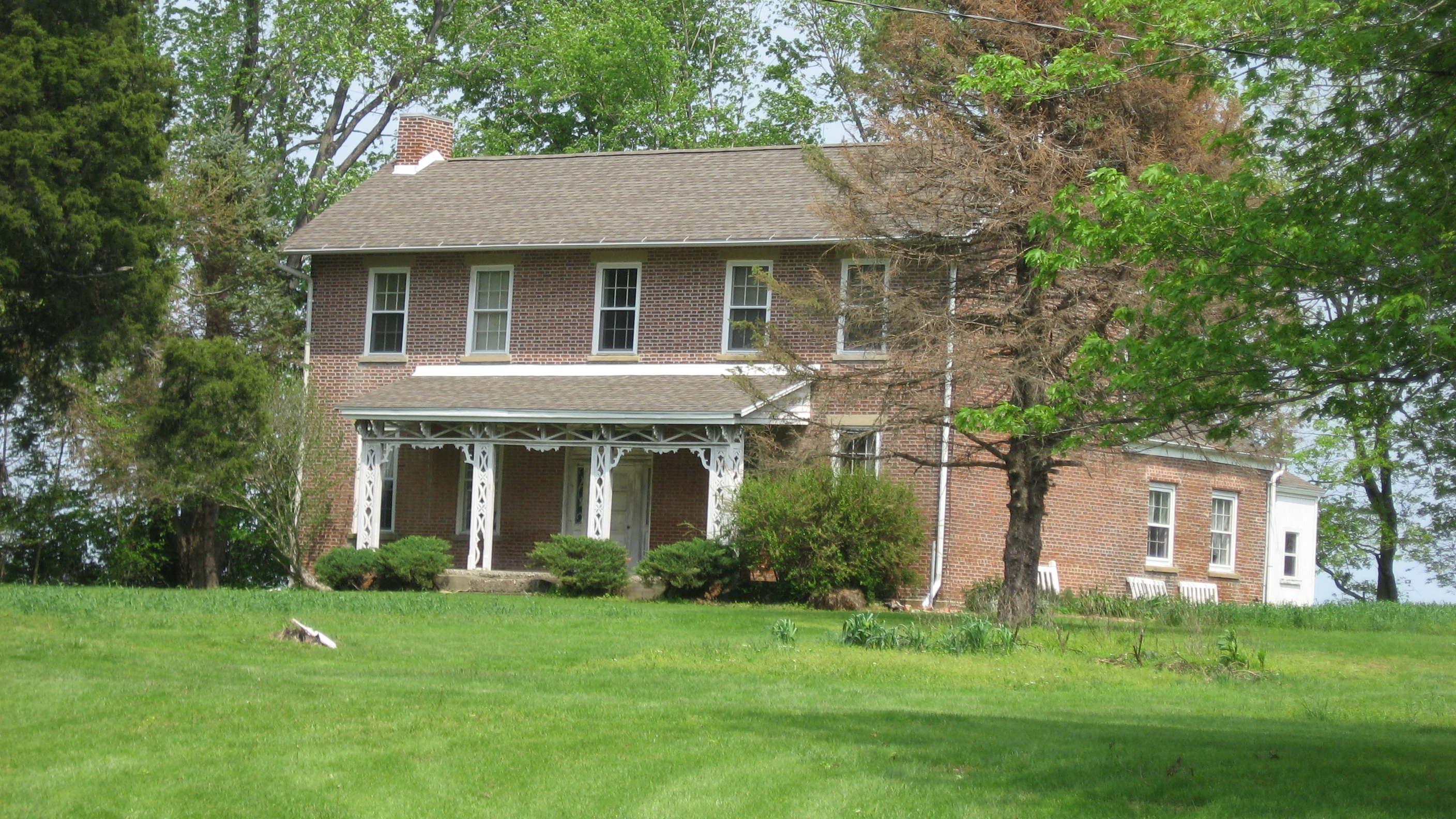
- Trippettt–Glaze–Duncan Farmhouse, April 2011

- Location within Indiana Location within the United States
- Nearest city: State Road 65 east of Patoka; also the Kolb Farm, located along State Road 65 east of Patoka, Washington Township, Gibson County, Indiana
- Coordinates: 38°21′1″N 87°34′45″W
- Area: 66 acres (27 ha)
- Built: c. 1850
- Architectural style: Vernacular, I-house
- NRHP reference No.: 93000470, 09001129 (Boundary Increase)
- Added to NRHP: May 28, 1993, December 28, 2009 (Boundary Increase)

Trippettt–Glaze–Duncan-Kolb Farm is a historic home and farm complex and national historic district located at Washington Township, Gibson County, Indiana. It encompasses seven contributing buildings, three contributing sites, three contributing structures, and two contributing objects. They include the brick I-house (c. 1850), frame granary (c. 1900), wood frame wagon shed (c. 1920), traverse frame barn (c. 1920), three-portal barn (c. 1920), wood frame tenant house (c. 1920), barn and shed (c. 1910), bunker silo, conservation pond, and the site of a ferry landing.

It was listed on the National Register of Historic Places in 1993, with a boundary increase in 2009.
