= Palace Lodge (Winslow, Indiana) =

- U.S. National Register of Historic Places
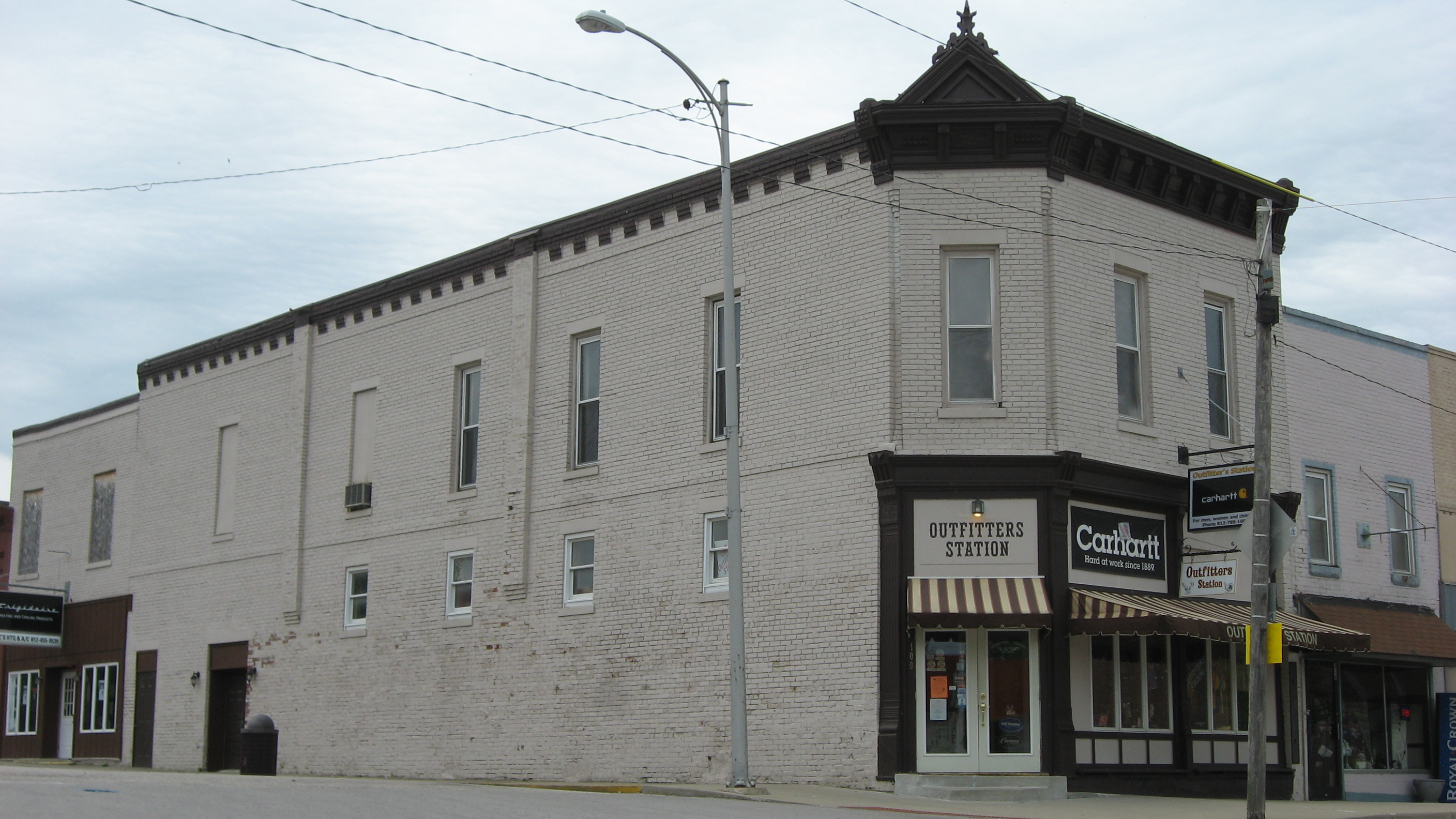
- Front and side of the Palace Lodge

- Location within Indiana Location within the United States
- Location: Center and Main Sts., Winslow, Indiana
- Coordinates: 38°22′58″N 87°12′57″W
- Area: Less than 1 acre (0.40 ha)
- Built: 1892
- Architectural style: Italianate
- NRHP reference No.: 84001217
- Added to NRHP: February 23, 1984

The Palace Lodge is a historic commercial building in the small town of Winslow, Indiana, United States. Since its construction in the late nineteenth century, the building has been the location of several businesses, the meeting place for two different secret societies, and the center of the town's commercial district. It has been declared a historic site because of its historically significant architecture.

== History ==
In the late nineteenth century, Winslow was the home of two different fraternal orders: the Independent Order of Odd Fellows and the Knights of Pythias. Seeing the benefits of coöperation, the two lodges worked together to erect a building in downtown Winslow, at the intersection of Main (now State Road 61) and Center Streets. After the building was finished in 1892, the two lodges used it jointly: their meetings were held on the first story, and they employed the second story as office space.

Unfortunately for the lodges, they became encumbered by debt soon after the building's construction, and their financial difficulties required them to sell the building in 1898. Local businessman Logan Robling purchased the property, which he converted into a general store. After his son Monroe Robling left the peddling business, the two men operated it together under the name of "L. Robling and Son." They remained in business until 1946, when they sold the property to Monroe's daughter Winifred and her husband, Neil Brown; the Browns operated a grocery store on the property for thirty-five years. Both the general store and the grocery store only occupied the first floor of the building; the second floor was typically used for office space or as apartments.

== Architecture ==
The Palace Lodge is a rectangular Italianate building; its front faces west toward Main Street, and its northern side is exposed to Center Street. Two stories tall, it is 23 feet (7.0 m) wide and 90 feet (27 m) from front to back. The front and side are divided into two and six bays respectively. A distinctive portion of its plan is the northwestern corner of the building, which features a small side angled 45° from both front and side, instead of the right angle found on the other corners. Customers may enter through any of three doorways: one each in the rear and the middle of the northern side, and one through the angle in the building's northwestern corner. The building is lit by multiple sizes of windows: the first-floor windows facing Center are small and high above ground level, the second-floor windows on both sides are large, and the two first-floor windows facing Main are large and feature prominent transoms.

Although the Palace Lodge is built of brick, many of its architectural details are formed from cast iron. The original cast-iron storefront survives on the first floor of the western side of the building, as do the iron brackets that form the cornice over the western front and northwestern corner. Conversely, the northern side is entirely brick, including the cornice and the two prominent chimneys.

Inside, the lodge retains its original floor plan: the first floor is a single large room, while six rooms compose the second floor. The walls of the interior rooms are covered with plaster, their floors are a mix of oak and pine, and the interior structure rests upon large beams of oak.

== Recent history ==
After the closure of the Brown Grocery Store, the Palace Lodge was vacant for a time, but it was purchased by a new owner who began to formulate plans to remodel it to have space both for offices and apartments as well as the traditional shop. Today, the lodge building is home to Outfitters Station, a clothing and leather goods store that was founded in 2007.

The oldest commercial structure in Winslow, the Palace Lodge is the town's best-preserved example of business blocks completed in the late nineteenth century. Because of its unusually well preserved architecture, it was listed on the National Register of Historic Places in 1984; it was the first property in Pike County to be given this distinction, and it was the only such property until a similar recognition was given to the Patoka Bridges Historic District in 2005.
