= Gibson Lake (Indiana) =

- Location within Indiana Location within the United States
- Location: Gibson Generating Station, Montgomery Township, Indiana
- Coordinates: 38.35°N 87.76°W
- Type: reservoir (cooling pond)
- Primary inflows: Lake Fill Pumps, Plant Water Discharges, McCarty Ditch
- Primary outflows: Patoka River, Plant Water Intakes
- Basin countries: United States
- Max. length: 1.5 mi (2.4 km)
- Max. width: 2 mi (3.2 km)
- Surface area: 2,900 acres (1,200 ha)
- Average depth: 15 ft (4.6 m)
- Max. depth: 24 ft (7.3 m)
- Water volume: 7,100,000,000 US gal (0.027 km^{3})
- Residence time: 2 weeks
- Shore length^{1}: 6 mi (9.7 km) (includes the central splitter dike)
- Surface elevation: 350 ft (110 m)
- Frozen: never
- Islands: none
- Settlements: Mount Carmel, Illinois (2 miles NW of the lake)
- ^{1} Shore length is not a well-defined measure.

Gibson Lake is the cooling pond for Duke Energy Indiana's Gibson Generating Station. Measuring at around 3,500 acres (14 km^{2}), it is the largest lake in Indiana built completely above ground, its shores consisting of rock levees on all but two of the lake's six sides both of which were also built up to build the power plant. Opened to fishing in 1978, Gibson Lake had been a prime source of bass and several types of catfish, bluegill, and carp. The lake was closed to fishing in 2007, due to elevated levels of selenium found in the water of the lake. The only entrance to Gibson Lake was the lake's boat ramp, located due southeast of the plant on Gibson County Road 975 South. Like the lake itself, the ramp has been closed since 2007.

Gibson Lake, due to it never getting colder than 40 °F (4 °C), caused by the hot outflows from the plant's condensers, is known to produce a little dusting of snow every now and then.

== Wildlife ==
The Gibson Lake and the rest of the Gibson Generating Station complex is home to several species of birds. They include:

- Red-throated loon
- Pacific loon
- Eared grebe
- Red-necked grebe
- Western grebe
- American white pelican
- Brown pelican
- Plegadis ibis
- Snowy egret
- Ross's goose
- Wood stork
- White-faced ibis
- Glossy ibis
- Black-bellied whistling duck
- White-winged scoter
- Surf scoter
- Long-tailed duck
- Golden eagle
- Peregrine falcon
- Wild turkey
- King rail
- Piping plover
- Least tern
- Green heron
- Canada goose
- Cackling goose

- American avocet
- Black-necked stilt
- Whimbrel
- Marbled godwit
- Hudsonian godwit
- Purple sandpiper
- Red knot
- Red phalarope
- Laughing gull
- Little gull
- Sabine's gull
- Glaucous gull
- Iceland gull
- Thayer's gull
- Lesser black-backed gull
- Pomarine jaeger
- Parasitic jaeger
- Swainson's hawk
- Gyrfalcon
- Snowy owl
- Le Conte's sparrow
- Henslow's sparrow
- Great blue heron
- Whooping crane
- White-fronted goose
- Mallard duck
- Snow goose
- Blue and green-winged teal

- Many of these birds use the area as a stop-over on their respective destinations. Wildlife and bird watchers will notice that Google Earth and Garmin GPS maps refer to the lake's location as Broad Pond. The ancient Broad Pond-Cane Ridge-Wabash River oxbow was once considered for a National Wildlife Refuge.

=== Specialty species ===
- Least terns - breed at Gibson Lake and Cane Ridge least tern habitat and may be seen anytime between mid-May and late August or early September.
- Bald eagles - are common during the winter and are usually encountered on a drive around the levee. They nest in the area next to the Wabash River.

== Temperature ==
The lake temperature very rarely falls below 40 °F (4 °C) at its coldest point, due mainly to the plant's condenser discharges. This often results in lake-effect snow or heavy frost falling in nearby areas.

=== Outflow (West) Side ===
Annual Temperature Range
Season	Min	Max
Winter	50 °F (10 °C)	65 °F (18 °C)
Summer	95 °F (35 °C)	110 °F (43 °C)

=== Inflow (East) Side ===
Annual Temperature Range
Season	Min	Max
Winter	40 °F (4 °C)	55 °F (13 °C)
Summer	88 °F (31 °C)	95 °F (35 °C)

The two sides are separated by a splitter dike that juts approximately 500 yards into the lake from the main plant that forces the water to remain in the lake for around 1–2 weeks.
