= Patoka Township, Gibson County, Indiana =

Patoka Township Gibson County
- Township
- Location of Patoka Township within Gibson County
- Coordinates: 38°21′03″N 87°35′28″W
- Country: United States
- State: Indiana
- County: Gibson
- Named for: Patoka River

Government
  - Type: Indiana township
  - Trustee: Phyllis Ernst

Area
  - Total: 68.92 sq mi (178.5 km^{2})
  - Land: 68.49 sq mi (177.4 km^{2})
  - Water: 0.43 sq mi (1.1 km^{2})
- Elevation: 446 ft (136 m)

Population (2020)
  - Total: 11,527
  - Density: 168.3/sq mi (64.98/km^{2})
- Time zone: UTC-6 (CST)
  - Summer (DST): UTC-5 (CDT)
- ZIP codes: 47670 47671
- Area code: 812 - 385 / 386 / 387 / 388 / 724 / 779
- FIPS code: 18-58338
- GNIS feature ID: 453709
- Largest Township in Gibson County by population

Patoka Township is one of ten townships in Gibson County, Indiana, United States. As of the 2020 census, its population was 11,527 (down from 11,864 at 2010) and it contained 5,309 housing units. It is the largest township in population, accounting for roughly 30% of the county's total population.

Historical population
Census	Pop.	Note	%±
1890	6,530		—
1900	8,712		33.4%
1910	9,439		8.3%
1920	9,840		4.2%
1930	10,459		6.3%
1940	11,099		6.1%
1950	11,189		0.8%
1960	11,135		−0.5%
1970	11,206		0.6%
1980	11,999		7.1%
1990	11,582		−3.5%
2000	11,502		−0.7%
2010	11,864		3.1%
2020	11,527		−2.8%
Source: US Decennial Census

== History ==
Patoka Township was organized in 1813. It took its name from the Patoka River.

The Lyles Consolidated School was listed on the National Register of Historic Places in 1999.

== Geography ==
According to the 2010 census, the township has a total area of 68.92 square miles (178.5 km^{2}), of which 68.49 square miles (177.4 km^{2}) (or 99.38%) is land and 0.43 square miles (1.1 km^{2}) (or 0.62%) is water.

=== Cities and towns ===
- Princeton (the county seat and largest community)

=== Unincorporated towns ===
- King's Station
- Lyles Station

(This list is based on USGS data and may include former settlements.)

=== Adjacent townships ===
- White River Township (north)
- Washington Township (northeast)
- Center Township (east)
- Union Township (south)
- Montgomery Township (southwest)

=== Cemeteries ===
The township contains seven cemeteries: Archer, Hitch, Maple Hill, Odd Fellows, Saint Josephs, Sand Hill and Warnock.

=== Major highways ===
- U.S. Route 41
- State Road 64
- State Road 65

== Education ==
Public education in Patoka Township is administered by the North Gibson School Corporation.

=== Public Schools ===
- Princeton Community Primary School
- Princeton Community Intermediate School
- Princeton Community Middle School
- Princeton Community High School

=== Private Schools ===
- St. Joseph Catholic School
- Bethel Christian School

=== Higher Education ===
- Vincennes University Workforce Development

== Museums ==
- Lyles Station Schoolhouse Museum - Lyles Station (2 miles WNW of Princeton)
