= Hazleton, Indiana =

Town of Hazleton, Indiana
- Town
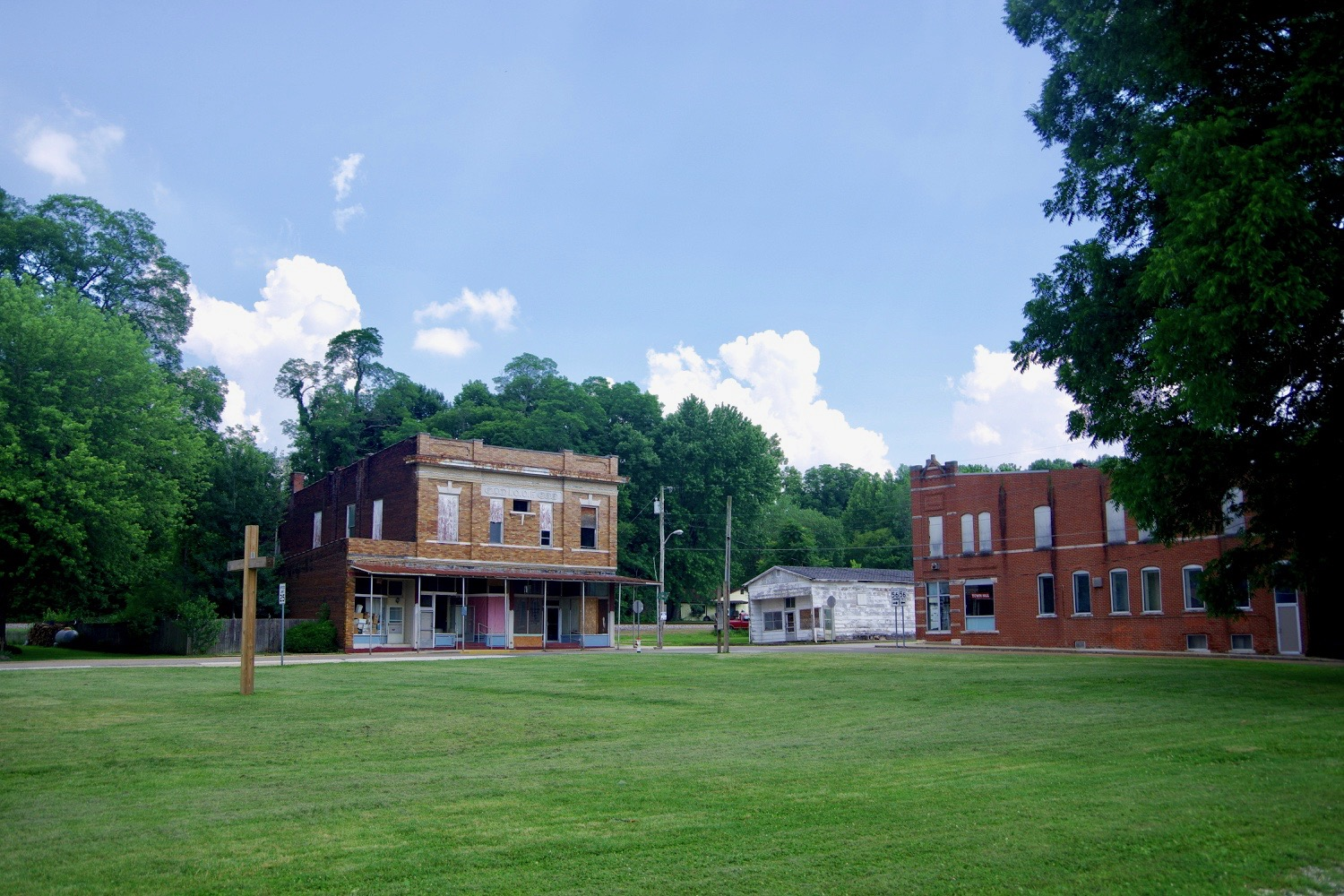
- Hazleton

- Location of Hazleton in Gibson County, Indiana.
- Coordinates: 38°29′21″N 87°32′26″W
- Country: United States
- State: Indiana
- County: Gibson
- Township: White River

Area
  - Total: 0.35 sq mi (0.90 km^{2})
  - Land: 0.35 sq mi (0.90 km^{2})
  - Water: 0 sq mi (0.00 km^{2})
- Elevation: 449 ft (137 m)

Population (2020)
  - Total: 194
  - Density: 560/sq mi (216.3/km^{2})
- Time zone: UTC-6 (CST)
  - Summer (DST): UTC-5 (CDT)
- ZIP code: 47640
- Area codes: 812, 930
- FIPS code: 18-32728
- GNIS feature ID: 2396992

Hazleton is a town in White River Township, Gibson County, Indiana, United States. As of the 2020 census, Hazleton had a population of 194. It is the second smallest community in the county. While having almost no connection to it, it is part of the Evansville, Indiana, Metropolitan Area.

== History ==
Hazleton is the second-oldest town in Gibson County after Patoka. It was named in honor of Gervas Hazleton, believed to be the second settler to permanently locate to the county. Hazleton first lived in a crude camp lit by large log fires that was a popular stopover for early migrants to the area.

The town was platted in 1856 by Lucius French. T. S. Fuller erected the town's first frame building, and John Breedlove built the town's blacksmith shop. The first steamboat of any note to travel up the White River was the Cleopatria in 1884.

On March 10, 1897, a passenger train of the Evansville and Terre Haute Railroad (now the Chicago & Eastern Illinois) wrecked near Hazleton. An embankment which carried the tracks past the White River had been weakened by the river's flood waters, and collapsed under the weight of the train, causing it to derail. Around a dozen people are believed to have been killed, though most bodies were never found.

== Geography ==
Hazleton is located at 38°29′20″N 87°32′30″W (38.488953, -87.541652). The town is situated along the south bank of the White River in northern Gibson County (the river marks the county line between Gibson and Knox counties). State Road 56 connects the town with U.S. Route 41, which runs northward to Vincennes and southward to the Evansville area. Hazleton is 422 feet (129 m) above sea level.

According to the 2010 census, Hazleton has a total area of 0.33 square miles (0.85 km^{2}), all land.

== Demographics ==
Historical population
Census	Pop.	Note	%±
1870	356		—
1880	618		73.6%
1890	608		−1.6%
1900	758		24.7%
1910	648		−14.5%
1920	605		−6.6%
1930	507		−16.2%
1940	516		1.8%
1950	498		−3.5%
1960	507		1.8%
1970	416		−17.9%
1980	368		−11.5%
1990	357		−3.0%
2000	288		−19.3%
2010	263		−8.7%
2020	194		−26.2%
U.S. Decennial Census

=== 2020 census ===
As of the census of 2020, there were 194 people, 108 households, and 78 families residing in the town. The population density was 797.0 inhabitants per square mile (307.7/km^{2}). There were 120 housing units at an average density of 363.6 per square mile (140.4/km^{2}). The racial makeup of the town was 97.3% White, 2.3% African American, and 0.4% from two or more races. Hispanic or Latino of any race were 0.4% of the population.

There were 108 households, of which 30.6% had children under the age of 18 living with them, 55.6% were married couples living together, 10.2% had a female householder with no husband present, 6.5% had a male householder with no wife present, and 27.8% were non-families. 24.1% of all households were made up of individuals, and 10.2% had someone living alone who was 65 years of age or older. The average household size was 2.44 and the average family size was 2.86.

The median age in the town was 44.9 years. 21.3% of residents were under the age of 18; 6% were between the ages of 18 and 24; 22.8% were from 25 to 44; 35.3% were from 45 to 64; and 14.4% were 65 years of age or older. The gender makeup of the town was 50.2% male and 49.8% female.

=== 2000 census ===
As of the census of 2000, there were 288 people, 108 households, and 84 families residing in the town. The population density was 841.0 inhabitants per square mile (324.7/km^{2}). There were 119 housing units at an average density of 347.5 per square mile (134.2/km^{2}). The racial makeup of the town was 97.22% White, and 2.78% from two or more races.

There were 108 households, out of which 24.1% had children under the age of 18 living with them, 60.2% were married couples living together, 13.9% had a female householder with no husband present, and 22.2% were non-families. 20.4% of all households were made up of individuals, and 6.5% had someone living alone who was 65 years of age or older. The average household size was 2.67 and the average family size was 3.08.

In the town, the population was spread out, with 21.5% under the age of 18, 11.8% from 18 to 24, 22.2% from 25 to 44, 31.3% from 45 to 64, and 13.2% who were 65 years of age or older. The median age was 40 years. For every 100 females, there were 100.0 males. For every 100 females age 18 and over, there were 93.2 males.

The median income for a household in the town was $31,875, and the median income for a family was $36,406. Males had a median income of $28,750 versus $28,750 for females. The per capita income for the town was $13,156. About 25.0% of families and 25.9% of the population were below the poverty line, including 36.9% of those under the age of eighteen and 12.5% of those 65 or over.

== Education ==
Prior to 1963, students were zoned to Hazleton High School. That year, it merged into White River High School, which had the school colors as red, white, and blue and the mascots as the Little Giants. In 1965, that school in turn merged into Princeton Community High School. Nathan Blackford of Evansville Living described White River High as "Possibly the shortest-lived high school of the consolidation era" as many school districts and schools in 1960s Indiana were merging with one another.
