= Mount Olympus, Indiana =

- Unincorporated community
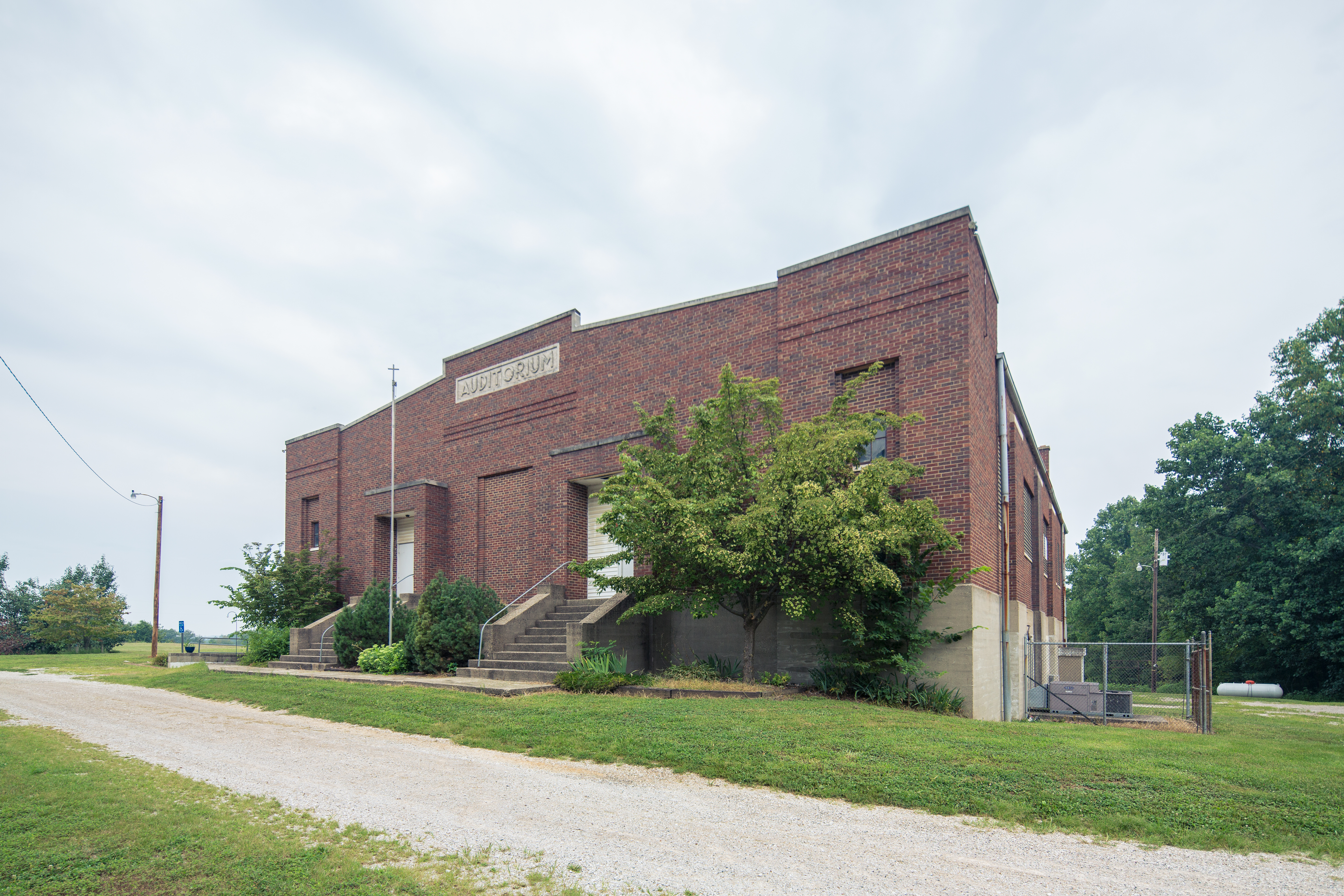

- Location within Indiana Location within the United States
- Coordinates: 38°26′50″N 87°28′30″W
- Country: United States
- State: Indiana
- County: Gibson
- Township: Washington
- Elevation: 528 ft (161 m)
- ZIP code: 47640
- FIPS code: 18-51480
- GNIS feature ID: 439635

Mount Olympus is an unincorporated community in Washington Township, Gibson County, Indiana. It was formerly called Ennes. A post office called Ennes operated from 1879 until 1883.

== Geography ==
Mount Olympus is located at 38°26′50″N 87°28′30″W.

== Education ==
Washington Township is in North Gibson School Corporation.

Prior to 1965, students were zoned to Mount Olympus High School. That year, it merged into Princeton Community High School.
