= Lyles Station, Indiana =

- Unincorporated community
- Location within Indiana Location within the United States
- Coordinates: 38°22′13″N 87°39′33″W
- Country: United States
- State: Indiana
- County: Gibson
- Township: Patoka
- Lyle's Purchase: 1849
- Elevation: 400 ft (120 m)

Population (2000)
  - Total: 401
- ZIP code: 47670
- FIPS code: 18-45414
- GNIS feature ID: 438427
- Website: http://lylesstation.org/

Lyles or Lyles Station is an unincorporated community in Patoka Township, Gibson County, Indiana. The community dates from 1849, although its early settlers first arrived in the 1830s, and it was formally named Lyles Station in 1886 to honor Joshua Lyles, a free African American who migrated with his family from Tennessee to Indiana around 1837. Lyles Station is one of Indiana's early black rural settlements and the only one remaining. The rural settlement reached its peak in the years between 1880 and 1912, when major structures in the community included the railroad depot, a post office, a lumber mill, two general stores, two churches, and a school. By the turn of the twentieth century, Lyles Station had fifty-five homes, with a population of more than 800 people. The farming community never fully recovered from the Great Flood of 1913, which destroyed much of the town. Most of its residents left for economic reasons, seeking opportunities for higher paying jobs and additional education in larger cities. By 1997 approximately fifteen families remained at Lyles Station, nearly all of them descended from the original settlers.

Although most of Indiana's black rural settlements no longer exist as self-contained communities, Lyles Station continues. The restored Lyles Consolidated School building, which serves as a local living history museum and a community center, and the Wayman Chapel African Methodist Episcopal Church, are two remaining points of interest in Lyles Station.

The "Power of Place" exhibition in the Smithsonian's National Museum of African American History and Culture on the National Mall in Washington, D.C., which opened in 2016, features Lyles Station as part of its exhibition on black rural communities in the Midwest. The exhibit includes hundreds of items from the Lyles Station area, including a horse-drawn plow used by Joshua Lyles, clothing, a quilt, and soil from the Greer family farm which has been farmed by the Greer family for over 150 years.

== Geography ==
Lyles Station is located in Patoka Township, Gibson County, Indiana, at 38°22′13″N 87°39′33″W, approximately 4.5 miles (7.2 km) west of Princeton, in the southwestern part of the state. By 1900, the settlement bordered the Patoka River on the north; old U.S. 41 on the east; Indiana State Route 64 on the south; and the boundary line with the Illinois state line on the west. Its proximity to the White, Patoka, and Wabash Rivers, makes it especially susceptible to flooding.

== Demographics ==
Lyles Station, whose early settlers arrived in the 1830s, dates from 1849 and is one of Indiana's early first black rural settlements. As of 2008 it is the only one remaining. Two other black rural settlements were established nearby: Roundtree, north of Lyles Station, and Sand Hill, two miles south. By the turn of the century, with approximately 800 residents, Lyles Station reached its peak as an active farming community. Lyles Station's population declined after a major flood in 1913; few residents and homes remain.

== History ==
Lyles Station is named in honor of Joshua Lyles (alternate spelling of Liles or Lisles), who was a free African American born around 1800, in Henry County, Virginia. He moved with his family to Montgomery County, Tennessee, as a boy and was raised in Springfield, Tennessee. Joshua and his wife, Carparta (Clara), migrated to Indiana around 1837. (Six of the couple's thirteen children were born in Tennessee, before their departure.)

Numerous articles written about Joshua Lyles assert, without any evidentiary verification, that he was born a slave and freed when he was twenty-eight years old. More recent scholarship citing archival records in Virginia, Tennessee, and Indiana provides documentation of family members' status as free persons. A reprint of an Indianapolis News article appearing in the Fort Wayne Evening Sentinel on July 26, 1902, may have initiated the information about Joshua Lyles being a freed slave.

Joshua Lyles was among the community's early pioneer settlers. He arrived about 1837 with members of his family. The Lyles family bought land near the confluence of the White, Patoka, and Wabash Rivers in what is now Patoka Township, Gibson County, Indiana. Joshua and his father, John, are listed in the 1840 census for the township as two of ten free black men who were heads of household. The other free black men listed as heads of households in the township's 1840 census were Nelson Bass, Joel Stewart, John A. Morland, Robert Cole, Banister Chaves, Thomas McDaniel, Isaac Williams, and Duke Anderson.

Joshua Lyles appeared to have been a successful farmer by 1850. The Agricultural Schedule for the 1850 census identifies Joshua Lyles as the owner of 320 acres (130 hectares) of land, 60 acres (24 hectares) of improved land and 260 acres (110 hectares) unimproved, with a farm valued at $500. Farm implements were valued at $10, the estimated value of his livestock at $247, and the value of the animals slaughtered was assessed at $99. The Schedule also indicates that the previous year (1849), Lyles had 4 horses, 10 cows, and 50 hogs. The Lyles farm produced 150 pounds (68 kg) of butter, 10 pounds (4.5 kg) of maple sugar, 60 pounds (27 kg) of honey, and 500 bushels of Indian corn. Joshua Lyles continued farming in Gibson County, eventually increasing his holdings to 1,200 acres (490 hectares). He died in 1885. In addition to Joshua, some of his siblings, and his father, three more of Lyles's siblings had moved to the Patoka Township community by the 1860s.

Shortly after the Civil War, Joshua Lyles returned to Tennessee to encourage family friends, free blacks, and newly emancipated slaves to settle in Indiana. He also provided land to further the settlement's development. In 1864 Lyles donated the land to build a subscription school in the community. In 1866 the community was granted a U.S. post office, which was replaced with rural route delivery service in 1917. Thomas Cole, another early settler, donated 1 acre (0.40 hectares) of land for the community's first cemetery. In 1870 Joshua Lyles donated 60 acres (24 hectares) of land to the Airline Railroad. In exchange, the railroad built a train station that provided the community with the means to export crops outside the local area. The railroad also offered passenger and mail service, which helped to speed up the settlement's growth.

Lyles Station reached its peak in the years between 1880 and 1912, when major structures in the community included the railroad depot, a post office, a lumber mill, a school, two churches, and two general stores. The community incorporated and was formally named Lyles Station in 1886 in honor of Joshua Lyles. By the turn of the twentieth century, the settlement had fifty-five homes, with a population of more than 800 people.

Unusually heavy rains in the Midwest caused the White, Wabash, and Patoka Rivers to overflow their banks during the Great Flood of 1913. The catastrophic flood destroyed much of Lyles Station. The community never fully recovered from the flood. Most of its residents left for economic reasons. Agriculture trends favored large farming operations over the small family farms such as those at Lyles Station. Former residents sought a less risky existence and better opportunities for higher paying jobs and additional education in larger cities. By 1997 approximately fifteen families remained at Lyles Station, nearly all of them descended from the original settlers. About six families remain in Lyles Station as of mid-2007.

Although most of Indiana's black rural settlements no longer exist as self-contained communities, Lyles Station continues. The community hosts annual reunions and its advocacy group, the Lyles Station Historic Preservation Corporation, preserves its heritage. The National Museum of African American History and Culture, slated to open its new building in Washington, D.C., in 2016, plans to feature Lyles Station as part of its exhibition on black rural communities in the Midwest.

== Education ==
The first school in what became Lyles Stations was subscription school, where parents paid a fee for their children to attend. Established about 1865, its classes were held in a local church building. The community's second school, a three-room schoolhouse, replaced the earlier school. It was built across the road from the Wayman Chapel African Methodist Episcopal Church.

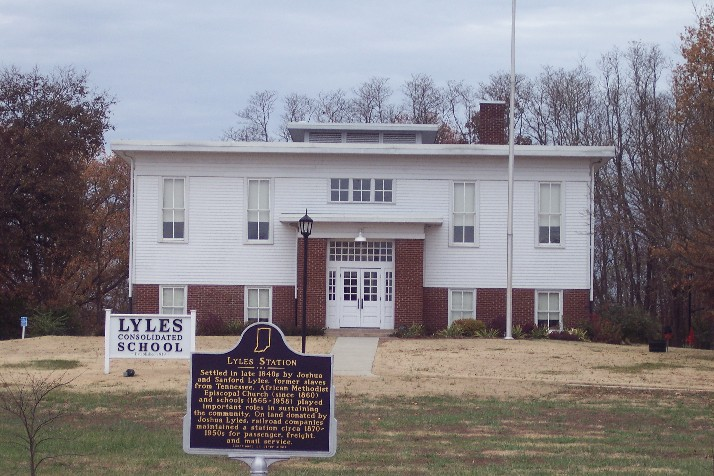
The restored Lyles Consolidated School building

Lyles Consolidated School, which now serves as a community center and museum, was Lyles Station's third school. Although the population of Lyles Station declined after the flood of 1913, a new school was erected to educate the remaining children of the community, when older schools at Lyles Station and nearby Sand Hill and Sugar Bluff were closed as part of a statewide trend towards school consolidation. The school opened in 1919 and was an integrated school until 1922, when it became an all-black public school. (White students were enrolled at Baldwin Heights School in Patoka Township.) Lyles Stations's school was integrated once again in the 1950s; it closed in 1958 due to declining enrollment.

Following its formation in 1997, the Lyles Station Historic Preservation Corporation began plans to restore Lyles Consolidated School for use as a local heritage classroom, living history museum, and community center. The school was listed on the National Register of Historic Places in 1999. After decades of deterioration, fundraising efforts and additional grants provided the financial resources needed to restore the school building to serve as a community gathering place and museum.

== Religion ==
Two churches were established at Lyles Station: Hardshell Baptist Church and Wayman Chapel African Methodist Episcopal Church. As of 2008 Wayman Chapel AME Church continued to hold regular Sunday services, with an average attendance of fifteen to twenty people. It is the only remaining AME church in Indiana that is located in an agricultural community.

== Transportation ==
The Lyles Station train depot for the Louisville-Saint Louis Railroad line, a division of the Southern Railway, provided the community with access to a wider area. Freight, passenger, and mail service also helped increase the settlement's growth. Passenger service at the local depot was discontinued after the community's population declined. A Norfolk Southern railway line runs along the north of the site.

== Points of interest ==
The restored Lyles Consolidated School building, which serves as a community center and local history museum, and the Wayman Chapel AME Church, are two remaining points of interest in Lyles Station to remind residents and visitor of its heritage as one of Indiana's early rural black communities.

While the Gibson Community Foundation helped with funding for the building restoration, the Lyles Station Historic Preservation Corporation also received grants from the United States Department of Agriculture & Build Indiana. The corporation chose two individuals noted as being experts in physical restoration to lead the project: Architect George Ridgway and contractor Jeffrrey Koester.

== Notable people ==
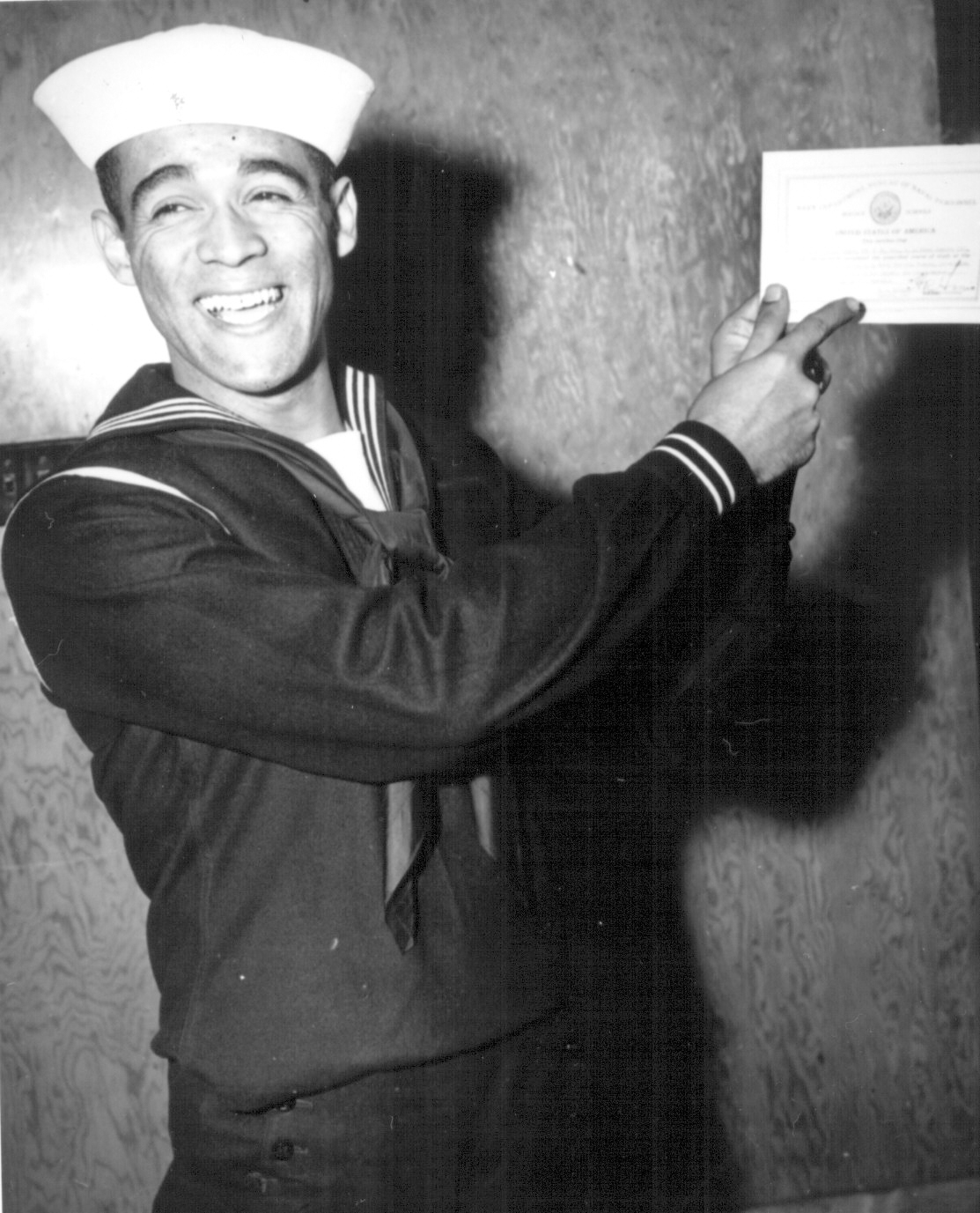
George C. Fields served as FDR's's valet for four years before entering the Navy in 1943.

- Alonzo Fields, the first African American chief butler of the White House, served for 21 years under presidents Herbert Hoover, Franklin D. Roosevelt, Harry S. Truman, and Dwight D. Eisenhower.
- George C. Fields, brother of Alonzo Fields, was Franklin D. Roosevelt's valet for four years. While accompanying the President on an inspection tour of the U.S. Naval Training Station at Great Lakes, Illinois, in 1942, he was inspired to join the U.S. Navy.
- Aaron R. Fisher, a World War I veteran, was a recipient of the Distinguished Service Cross.
- Vertus Hardiman, a victim of a U.S. government human radiation experiment at the age of five that left him with a painful skull deformity, became the subject of a documentary film, "Hole in the Head: A Life Revealed".
- Matthias Nolcox was the first principal of Crispus Attucks High School in Indianapolis.
- Reverend Lyman Parks was the first African American mayor of Grand Rapids, Michigan.
