= King, Indiana =

- Unincorporated community
- Location within Indiana Location within the United States
- Coordinates: 38°18′15″N 87°34′34″W
- Country: United States
- State: Indiana
- County: Gibson
- Township: Patoka
- Elevation: 466 ft (142 m)
- ZIP code: 47670
- FIPS code: 18-39780
- GNIS feature ID: 437317

King is an unincorporated community in Patoka Township, Gibson County, Indiana, United States. It is also referred to as Kings or as King's Station.

== History ==
King had its start in the early 1850s when the Evansville & Terre Haute Railroad was extended to that point. It was named for John King, a pioneer settler.

A post office was established at King in 1882, and remained in operation until it was discontinued in 1908.

== Geography ==
King is located at 38°18′15″N 87°34′34″W.
