= Inglefield, Indiana =

Inglefield, Indiana Ingle's
- farm, post-office, and railway station
- Interactive map of Inglefield, Indiana
- Coordinates: 38°6′29″N 87°33′32″W
- Country: United States
- State: Indiana
- County: Vanderburgh
- Township: Scott

Inglefield in Scott Township, Vanderburgh County, Indiana; also known as Ingle's and Ingles, and later to be a post-office, a village, and a railway station; began life as the farm of one John Ingle Sr.

Ingle's was the first stop for travellers that was to appear on the road from Evansville to Princeton, back when it wound through woodland, before the state straightened the road.

As a railroad stop on the Evansville and Crawfordsville Railroad it was known in the middle of the 19th century as Ingles, later to become Inglefield on the later Evansville and Terre Haute Railroad (E&THR) and Chicago and Iowa Railroad, now CSX Railroad. The Inglefield post-office was originally named Sandersville, as was a town that Ingle Sr attempted to found.

== John Ingle, Sr and Jr ==
Both Ingle Sr and his son John Ingle Jr were born in Somersham in England, the former in 1788 and the latter in 1812. The Ingles came to the United States in 1818, and after short stays in Evansville and Princeton came to the farm in Scott Township. Ingle Sr ran the post-office on his farm for 45 years. He originally named it Sandersville on 1823-11-27 but it changed name to Inglefield on 1869-11-17.

Sandersville was also the town that Ingle Sr platted on 1819-04-26. It comprised 160 acres (65 ha) with a 266 by 255 feet (81 by 78 m) public square. Some houses were erected including, in addition to Ingle's post-office, a store and a blacksmith's; but the town was largely abandoned by 1830 with only the post-office remaining.

Ingle Sr, William Ingle, and others later contributed US$1,800 (equivalent to $41,464 in 2025) to the erection in 1867 of a Centenary Methodist Episcopal church nearby (38°06′32″N 87°32′56″W).

William D. Miller, who had been a depot agent and a telegraph operator on the E&THR and a merchant at Inglefield, the only one left by 1889, took up the postmastership of Inglefield in March 1884.

After education in Princeton (Indiana) and Philadelphia, Ingle Jr eventually became a lawyer with a practice in Evansville. He was one of the founders of the Evansville and Crawfordsville Railroad; and, having initially being a superintendent, was the president of the company for over 20 years. He also ran the John Ingle & Company coal mining business, incorporated in 1866. By the end of the 19th century the business was in the hands of his sons, George and John Ingle, with 200 acres (81 ha) near the local insane asylum and a further 140 acres (57 ha) around Coal Mine Hill at a bend of the Ohio River, where the company had sunk its first shaft. It was producing 50,000 long tons (51,000 Mg) of coal per year.

== Others ==
Other people associated with Inglefield include Dr Thomas Runcie, an immigrant from Ireland, who practiced medicine there from 1849 until his death in 1867. Samuel Scott, after whom Scott Township is named, once lived around 1 mile (1.6 km) south of where Inglefield would be.

In the other direction, roughly 1 mile (1.6 km) north, James Cawson had run the second place to be cleared in the woodland for travellers to rest on the Evansville to Princeton road. It was later to become the Ritchey homestead and the site of the Lockyear blacksmith's, the first smithy in the Township.
