= Decker, Indiana =

Town in the United States

- Town
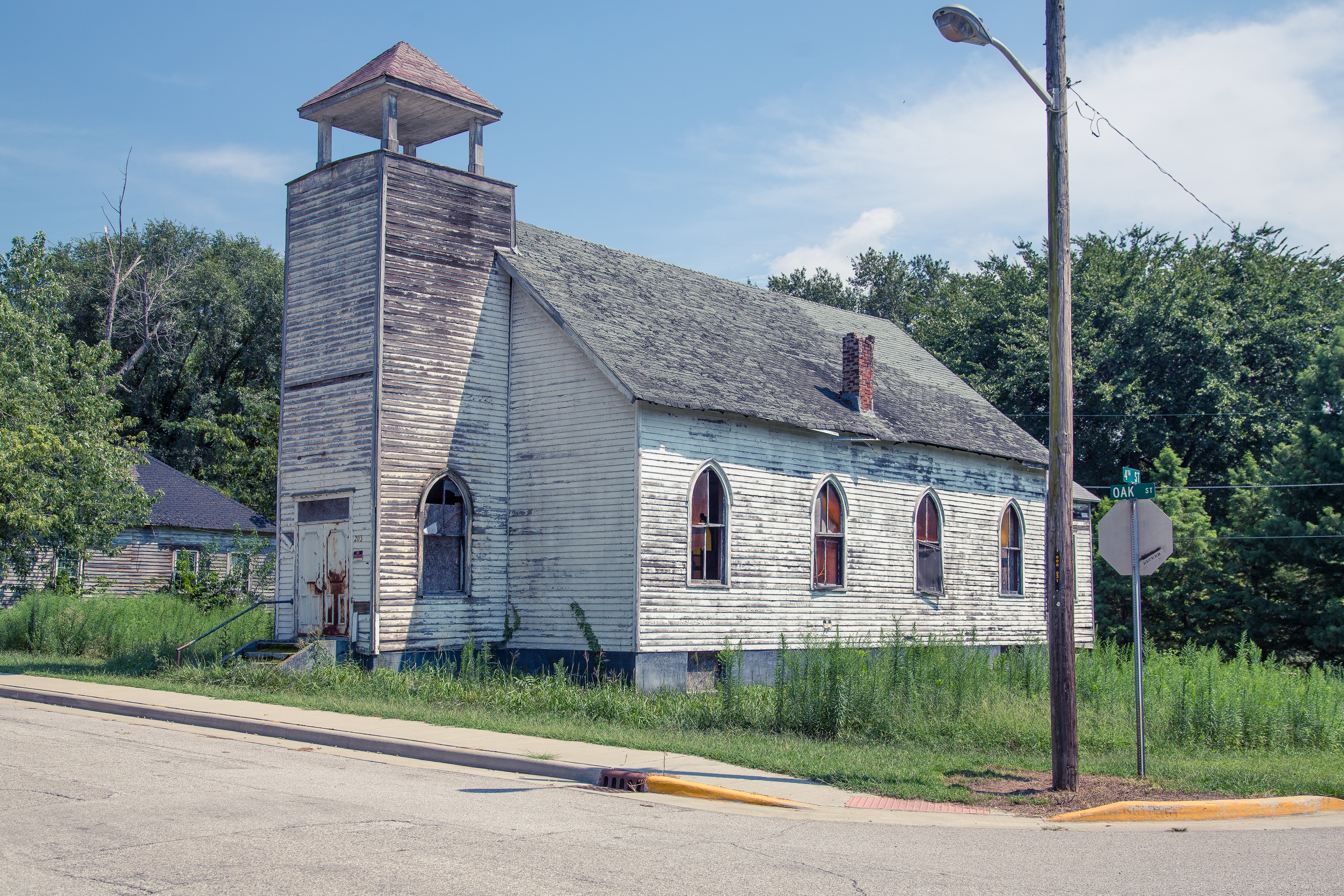

- Location of Decker in Knox County, Indiana.
- Coordinates: 38°31′07″N 87°31′27″W
- Country: United States
- State: Indiana
- County: Knox
- Township: Johnson

Area
  - Total: 0.18 sq mi (0.47 km^{2})
  - Land: 0.18 sq mi (0.47 km^{2})
  - Water: 0 sq mi (0.00 km^{2})
- Elevation: 453 ft (138 m)

Population (2020)
  - Total: 199
  - Density: 1,102/sq mi (425.5/km^{2})
- Time zone: UTC-5 (EST)
  - Summer (DST): UTC-4 (EDT)
- ZIP code: 47524
- Area code: 812
- FIPS code: 18-17110
- GNIS feature ID: 2396684

Decker is a town in Johnson Township, Knox County, Indiana, United States. The population was 199 at the 2020 census. It was founded in 1869 by Isaac Decker. Decker is near the White River, and is well known for the watermelon and cantaloupe produced in the surrounding rural area.

== Geography ==
According to the 2010 census, Decker has a total area of 0.18 square miles (0.47 km^{2}), all land.

== Demographics ==
Historical population
Census	Pop.	Note	%±
1930	468		—
1940	466		−0.4%
1950	386		−17.2%
1960	317		−17.9%
1970	268		−15.5%
1980	256		−4.5%
1990	281		9.8%
2000	283		0.7%
2010	249		−12.0%
2020	199		−20.1%
U.S. Decennial Census

=== 2010 census ===
At the 2010 census, there were 249 people, 92 households and 68 families living in the town. The population density was 1,383.3 per square mile (534.1/km^{2}). There were 109 housing units at an average density of 605.6 per square mile (233.8/km^{2}). The racial make-up of the town was 97.6% White, 1.2% African American, 0.8% Asian and 0.4% from two or more races.

There were 92 households, of which 33.7% had children under the age of 18 living with them, 63.0% were married couples living together, 8.7% had a female householder with no husband present, 2.2% had a male householder with no wife present and 26.1% were non-families. 20.7% of all households were made up of individuals and 8.7% had someone living alone who was 65 years of age or older. The average household size was 2.71 and the average family size was 3.16.

The median age was 39.3 years. 24.9% of residents were under the age of 18, 8.7% were between the ages of 18 and 24, 22.8% were from 25 to 44, 30.4% were from 45 to 64 and 12.9% were 65 years of age or older. The sex make-up of the town was 52.2% male and 47.8% female.

=== 2000 census ===
At the 2000 census, there were 283 people, 107 households and 80 families living in the town. The population density was 1,081.0 per square mile (417.4/km^{2}). There were 120 housing units at an average density of 458.4 per square mile (177.0/km^{2}). The racial mak-eup of the town was 99.65% White and 0.35% from other races. Hispanic or Latino of any race were 0.35% of the population.

There were 107 households, of which 33.6% had children under the age of 18 living with them, 51.4% were married couples living together, 15.9% had a female householder with no husband present and 24.3% were non-families. 23.4% of all households were made up of individuals and 11.2% had someone living alone who was 65 years of age or older. The average household size was 2.64 and the average family size was 3.05.

28.6% of the population were under the age of 18, 10.2% from 18 to 24, 24.7% from 25 to 44, 21.6% from 45 to 64 and 14.8% were 65 years of age or older. The median age was 37 years. For every 100 females, there were 106.6 males. For every 100 females age 18 and over, there were 94.2 males.

The median household income was $24,821 and the median family income was $28,750. Males had a median income of $25,000 and females $15,714. The per capita income was $15,482. About 14.3% of families and 21.3% of the population were below the poverty line, including 26.7% of those under the age of eighteen and 20.6% of those 65 or over.

== Education ==
The school at Decker provided all grades until 1967, when the middle and high school grades were consolidated into South Knox Middle/High School. The school continued to provide grades K-5 until 1999, when those grades were also consolidated. The school mascot was the "Aces", which originally referred to wartime airplane pilots, and later to the aces in playing cards. The old high school building was struck by lightning, and subsequently destroyed by fire on July 9, 2024.
