= Lyles Consolidated School =

- U.S. National Register of Historic Places
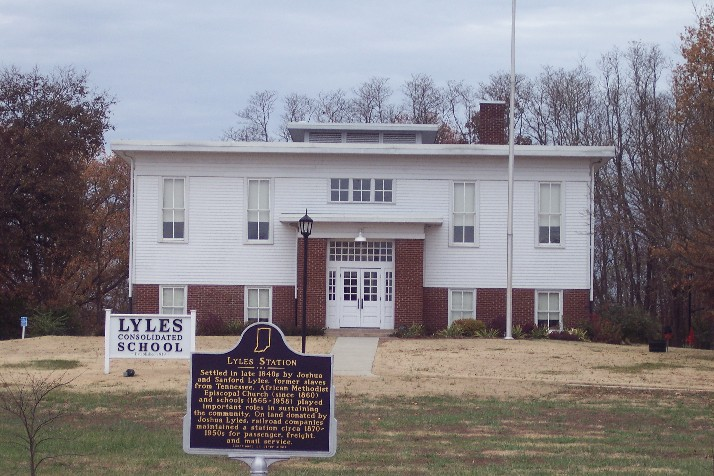
- Front of the school

- Location within Indiana Location within the United States
- Location: 953 County Road 500 W, Lyles Station, Indiana
- Coordinates: 38°22′11″N 87°39′36″W
- Area: 2.3 acres (0.93 ha)
- Built: 1919
- Architectural style: Prairie School
- MPS: Indiana's Public Common and High Schools MPS
- NRHP reference No.: 99001111
- Added to NRHP: September 9, 1999

Lyles Consolidated School is a historic school in Lyles Station, Indiana. The third school to be located in Lyles Station, it was opened in 1919 and used until 1958. Abandoned for nearly forty years, it had deteriorated almost to the point of total collapse by 1997 when the Lyles Station Historic Preservation Corporation was founded in June 1997 to preserve and promote the history of the Lyles Station community. Its major project was restoration of the schoolhouse, intending to use it as a living history museum to educate others both about Lyles Station's history and the daily school life in the early twentieth century. The school was listed on the National Register of Historic Places in 1999. Restoration of the site was completed in 2003.

== History ==
=== Community ===
The community of Lyles Station, which also includes its school, is an unincorporated community in Patoka Township, Gibson County, Indiana. Lyles Station is one of Indiana's early black rural settlements and the only one remaining. The rural settlement dates from 1849. It was formally named Lyles Station in 1886 to honor Joshua Lyles, a free African American who was one of its early settlers. Lyles migrated with his family from Tennessee to Indiana around 1837.

Lyles Station reached its peak in the years between 1880 and 1912, when major structures in the community included a school, railroad depot, a post office, a lumber mill, two general stores, and two churches. By the turn of the twentieth century, Lyles Station had fifty-five homes and a population of more than 800 people; however, the farming community never fully recovered from the Great Flood of 1913, which destroyed much of the town. Most of its residents left to find higher paying jobs and additional education in larger cities. By 1997, approximately fifteen families remained at Lyles Station, nearly all of them descended from the original settlers.

=== School ===
In 1864 Joshua Lyles donated the land to build a school in the community. The first school in what became Lyles Stations was a subscription school, where parents paid a fee for their children to attend. Established about 1865, its classes were held in a local church building. The community's second school, a three-room schoolhouse, replaced the earlier school. It was built across the road from the Wayman Chapel African Methodist Episcopal Church.

Lyles Consolidated School was Lyles Station's third school. Although the population of Lyles Station declined after the flood of 1913, a new school building was erected to educate the remaining children of the community; older schools at Lyles Station and nearby Sand Hill and Sugar Bluff were closed as part of a statewide trend towards school consolidation. The school opened in 1919 and was an integrated school until 1922, when it became an all-black public school. (White students were enrolled at Baldwin Heights School in Patoka Township.) In 1928, the parents of 10 children at school, including Vertus Hardiman, were approached by county hospital officials. The parents were told that there was a new treatment for dermatophytosis, a fungal infection commonly known as "ringworm". What the parents did not know was that the children were actually part of a human experiment on extreme radiation, probably chosen because they lived in such an isolated location, and probably because they were all Black. The children were exposed to high levels and many were left with disfiguring scalp scars and head trauma. The effects of the experiments were mostly hidden from the townspeople of Lyles Station. Many of the children wore wigs and hats to cover up the results of the experiments.

Lyles Stations's school was integrated once again in the 1950s; it closed in 1958 due to declining enrollment. Following its formation in 1997, the Lyles Station Historic Preservation Corporation began plans to restore Lyles Consolidated School for use as a local heritage classroom, living history museum, and community center. The school was listed on the National Register of Historic Places in 1999. After decades of deterioration, fundraising efforts and additional grants provided the financial resources needed to restore the old building in 2003.

== Description ==
The restored school building serves as a community center and local history museum.

When the National Register nomination form was prepared in 1998, the school had deteriorated but its building materials were original to the construction date. The exterior was described as a two-story brick and wood building in the Prairie School style that featured a low, flat roof. The first floor was covered with red brick; the second was sheathed in clapboard siding. A cupola with a hipped roof project from the center of the roof. A brick chimney extended above the roofline. The facade featured eight, double hung windows. A projecting entrance with concrete steps lead to double entry doors. Three fixed windows were centered above the entrance.

The National Register nomination form described the interior as it looked in 1998. Main entry doors opened onto two flights of wooden stairs and a hall. The first floor had a large auditorium space on the south side. Rooms across the hall included a classroom, utility area, and boiler room/coal storage area. A dressing room was located at the far end of the hall. The second floor included classrooms, an office, and a storage room.

== Legacy ==
Although most of Indiana's black rural settlements no longer exist as self-contained communities, Lyles Station continues. The restored school building and the Wayman Chapel AME Church are two remaining points of interest in Lyles Station to remind residents and visitor of its heritage as one of Indiana's early rural black communities. The community hosts annual reunions and its advocacy group, the Lyles Station Historic Preservation Corporation, preserves its heritage.
