= Decker Township, Knox County, Indiana =

Decker Township
- Township
- Coordinates: 38°28′32″N 87°38′00″W
- Country: United States
- State: Indiana
- County: Knox
- Township Seat: Decker
- School District: South Knox School Corporation

Government
  - Type: Indiana township

Area
  - Total: 46.43 sq mi (120.3 km^{2})
  - Land: 44.35 sq mi (114.9 km^{2})
  - Water: 2.08 sq mi (5.4 km^{2})
- Elevation: 400 ft (122 m)

Population (2020)
  - Total: 209
  - Density: 4.71/sq mi (1.82/km^{2})
- FIPS code: 18-17128
- GNIS feature ID: 453256

Decker Township is one of ten townships in Knox County, Indiana. As of the 2020 census, its population was 209 (down from 227 at 2010) and it contained 95 housing units.

Historical population
Census	Pop.	Note	%±
1890	1,000		—
1900	1,327		32.7%
1910	1,328		0.1%
1920	1,133		−14.7%
1930	1,009		−10.9%
1940	868		−14.0%
1950	639		−26.4%
1960	432		−32.4%
1970	333		−22.9%
1980	270		−18.9%
1990	251		−7.0%
2000	242		−3.6%
2010	227		−6.2%
2020	209		−7.9%
Source: US Decennial Census

== History ==
Decker Township is named for the Decker family of pioneer settlers.

== Geography ==
According to the 2010 census, the township has a total area of 46.43 square miles (120.3 km^{2}), of which 44.35 square miles (114.9 km^{2}) (or 95.52%) is land and 2.08 square miles (5.4 km^{2}) (or 4.48%) is water.
