= Patoka Bridges Historic District =

Historic district in Indiana, United States

- U.S. National Register of Historic Places
- U.S. Historic district
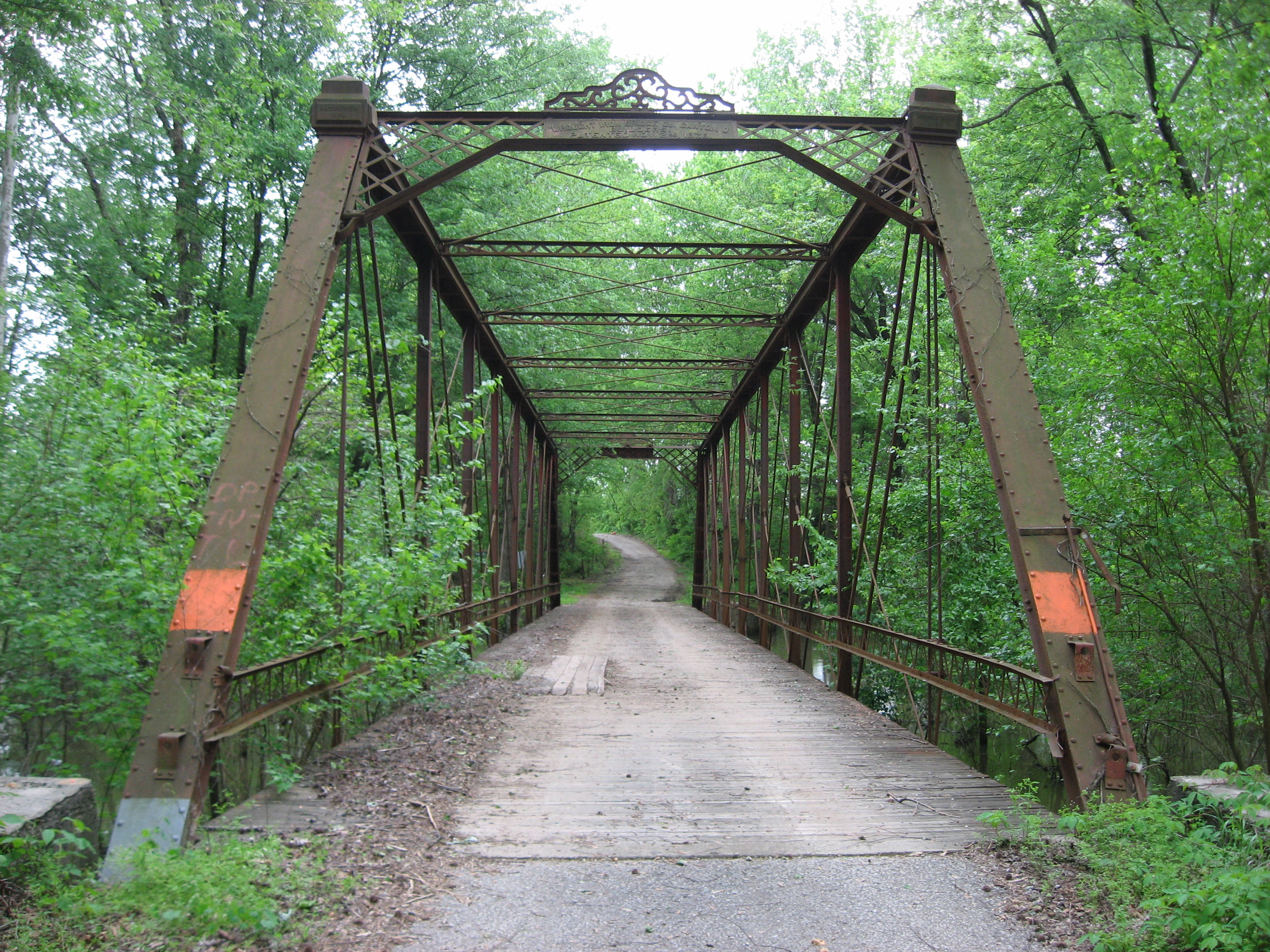
- Bridge 246 at Patoka, April 2011

- Location within Indiana Location within the United States
- Nearest city: Along County Road 300 W spanning the Patoka River, north of Oakland City, Indiana and Logan Township, Pike County, Indiana
- Coordinates: 38°22′52″N 87°20′22″W
- Area: 5 acres (2.0 ha)
- Built: 1884, 1924
- Architect: Wrought Iron Bridge Co.
- Architectural style: Pratt through truss
- NRHP reference No.: 05000198
- Added to NRHP: March 25, 2005

Patoka Bridges Historic District is a national historic district located in Columbia Township, Gibson County, Indiana and Logan Township, Pike County, Indiana. The district encompasses two contributing bridges, known as Pike County Bridge #246 and Pike County Bridge #81. Pike County Bridge #246, also known as the Iron Dongola Bridge, was built in 1884 by the Wrought Iron Bridge Company. It is a Pratt through truss wrought and cast iron bridge measuring 124 feet long. Pike County Bridge #81, also known as the Steel Bridge at Houchins Ditch, was built in 1924. It is a camelback through truss steel bridge measuring 145 feet long.

It was listed on the National Register of Historic Places in 2005.
