= Johnson Township, Knox County, Indiana =

Johnson Township
- Township
- Coordinates: 38°34′08″N 87°30′37″W
- Country: United States
- State: Indiana
- County: Knox

Government
  - Type: Indiana township

Area
  - Total: 50.98 sq mi (132.0 km^{2})
  - Land: 50.51 sq mi (130.8 km^{2})
  - Water: 0.47 sq mi (1.2 km^{2})
- Elevation: 502 ft (153 m)

Population (2020)
  - Total: 1,237
  - Density: 24.49/sq mi (9.456/km^{2})
- FIPS code: 18-38700
- GNIS feature ID: 453513

Johnson Township is one of ten townships in Knox County, Indiana. As of the 2020 census, its population was 1,237 (down from 1,382 at 2010) and it contained 586 housing units.

Historical population
Census	Pop.	Note	%±
1890	1,967		—
1900	2,522		28.2%
1910	2,624		4.0%
1920	2,311		−11.9%
1930	2,414		4.5%
1940	2,233		−7.5%
1950	1,962		−12.1%
1960	1,714		−12.6%
1970	1,544		−9.9%
1980	1,501		−2.8%
1990	1,449		−3.5%
2000	1,486		2.6%
2010	1,382		−7.0%
2020	1,237		−10.5%
Source: US Decennial Census

== History ==
Johnson Township is named for Thomas Johnson, an early pioneer settler who arrived in 1800, settling on land that later became the Purcell Station area. His son Thomas Johnson Jr. expanded the property and married into the Catt family.

== Geography ==
According to the 2010 census, the township has a total area of 50.98 square miles (132.0 km^{2}), of which 50.51 square miles (130.8 km^{2}) (or 99.08%) is land and 0.47 square miles (1.2 km^{2}) (or 0.92%) is water. The town of Decker, formerly called Deckertown," is in this township (not Decker Township).
