= Patoka, Indiana =

- Town
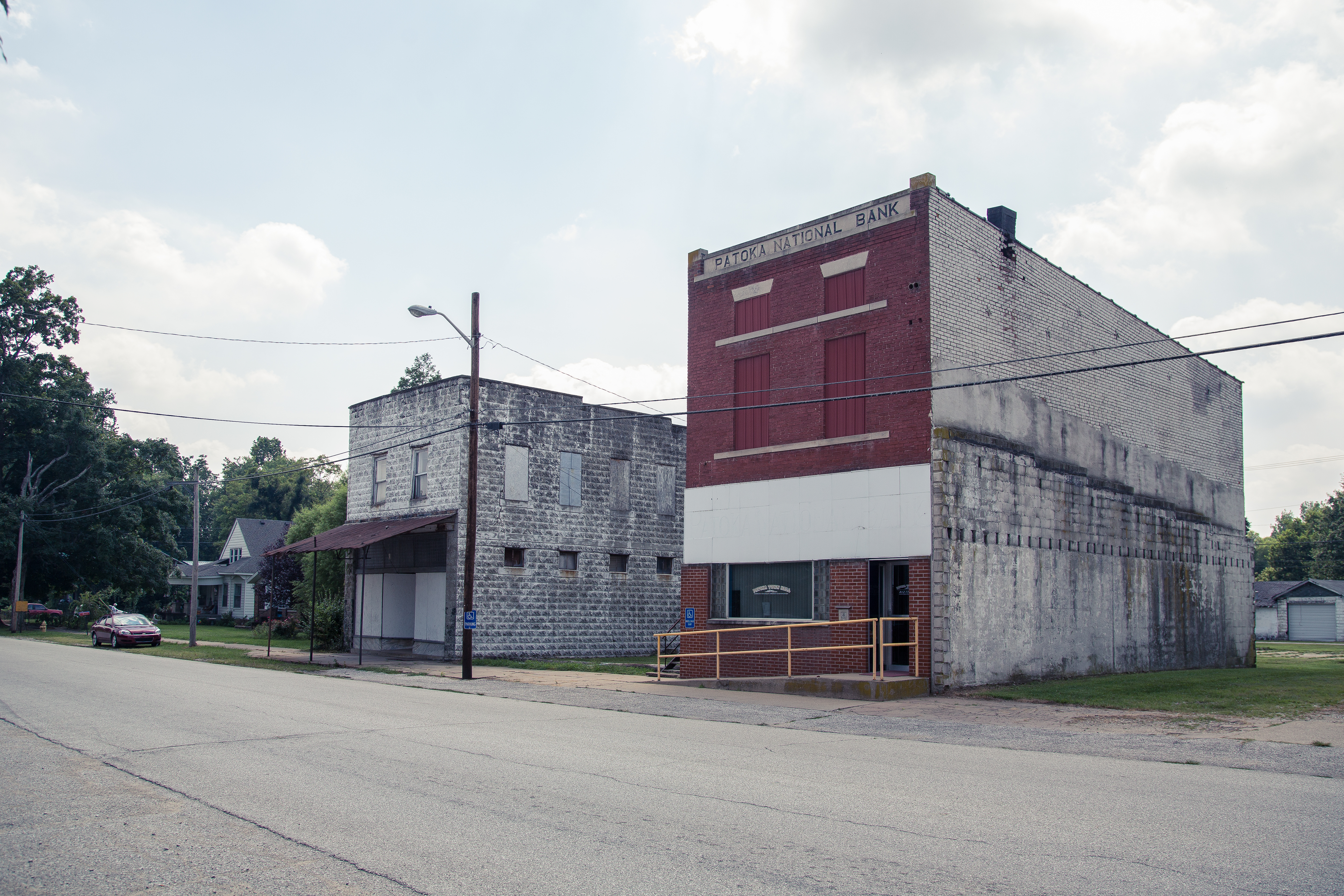

- Location of Patoka in Gibson County, Indiana.
- Coordinates: 38°24′03″N 87°35′15″W
- Country: United States
- State: Indiana
- County: Gibson
- Township: White River

Area
  - Total: 1.21 sq mi (3.13 km^{2})
  - Land: 1.19 sq mi (3.09 km^{2})
  - Water: 0.015 sq mi (0.04 km^{2})
- Elevation: 404 ft (123 m)

Population (2020)
  - Total: 706
  - Density: 592.1/sq mi (228.61/km^{2})
- Time zone: UTC-6 (Central (CST))
  - Summer (DST): UTC-5 (CDT)
- ZIP code: 47666
- Area codes: 812, 930
- FIPS code: 18-58320
- GNIS feature ID: 2396850

Patoka is the fourth largest town and sixth largest community in Gibson County, Indiana, United States. As of the 2020 census, Patoka had a population of 706.

== History ==
Patoka was laid out and platted in 1813. The town's name comes from an Indian word meaning "log on bottom", on account of the many muddy logs at the bottom of the river. The Patoka post office was established in 1833.

== Geography ==
According to the 2010 census, Patoka has a total area of 1.14 square miles (2.95 km^{2}), of which 1.12 square miles (2.90 km^{2}) (or 98.25%) is land and 0.02 square miles (0.05 km^{2}) (or 1.75%) is water.

== Demographics ==
Historical population
Census	Pop.	Note	%±
1850	99		—
1860	409		313.1%
1870	844		106.4%
1880	775		−8.2%
1890	729		−5.9%
1900	710		−2.6%
1910	657		−7.5%
1920	673		2.4%
1930	634		−5.8%
1940	569		−10.3%
1950	626		10.0%
1960	579		−7.5%
1970	529		−8.6%
1980	832		57.3%
1990	704		−15.4%
2000	749		6.4%
2010	735		−1.9%
2020	706		−3.9%
U.S. Decennial Census

=== 2010 census ===
As of the census of 2010, there were 735 people, 295 households, and 215 families living in the town. The population density was 656.2 inhabitants per square mile (253.4/km^{2}). There were 344 housing units at an average density of 307.1 per square mile (118.6/km^{2}). The racial makeup of the town was 95.8% White, 1.1% African American, 0.4% Native American, 0.3% Asian, 0.4% from other races, and 2.0% from two or more races. Hispanic or Latino of any race were 1.0% of the population.

There were 295 households, of which 32.9% had children under the age of 18 living with them, 51.5% were married couples living together, 14.2% had a female householder with no husband present, 7.1% had a male householder with no wife present, and 27.1% were non-families. 23.1% of all households were made up of individuals, and 9.1% had someone living alone who was 65 years of age or older. The average household size was 2.49 and the average family size was 2.88.

The median age in the town was 41.4 years. 24.6% of residents were under the age of 18; 7.1% were between the ages of 18 and 24; 23.8% were from 25 to 44; 27.8% were from 45 to 64; and 16.7% were 65 years of age or older. The gender makeup of the town was 53.5% male and 46.5% female.

=== 2000 census ===
As of the census of 2000, there were 749 people, 308 households, and 217 families living in the town. The population density was 1,064.2 inhabitants per square mile (410.9/km^{2}). There were 338 housing units at an average density of 480.2 per square mile (185.4/km^{2}). The racial makeup of the town was 97.06% White, 1.74% African American, 0.40% from other races, and 0.80% from two or more races. Hispanic or Latino of any race were 0.27% of the population.

There were 308 households, out of which 32.1% had children under the age of 18 living with them, 50.0% were married couples living together, 16.2% had a female householder with no husband present, and 29.5% were non-families. 25.0% of all households were made up of individuals, and 12.0% had someone living alone who was 65 years of age or older. The average household size was 2.43 and the average family size was 2.86.

In the town, the population was spread out, with 25.2% under the age of 18, 8.0% from 18 to 24, 29.2% from 25 to 44, 25.6% from 45 to 64, and 11.9% who were 65 years of age or older. The median age was 38 years. For every 100 females, there were 103.0 males. For every 100 females age 18 and over, there were 95.1 males.

The median income for a household in the town was $35,208, and the median income for a family was $40,227. Males had a median income of $33,636 versus $18,681 for females. The per capita income for the town was $16,587. About 9.6% of families and 10.8% of the population were below the poverty line, including 9.5% of those under age 18 and 17.5% of those age 65 or over.

== Education ==
Residents are in North Gibson School Corporation.

Prior to 1963, students were zoned to Patoka High School. That year, it merged into White River High School, which had the school colors as red, white, and blue and the mascots as the Little Giants. In 1965, that school in turn merged into Princeton Community High School. Nathan Blackford of Evansville Living described White River High as "Possibly the shortest-lived high school of the consolidation era" as many school districts and schools in 1960s Indiana were merging with one another.

== Notable people ==
- Smith Miller, U.S. representative from Indiana
