= Patoka River =

River in the United States of America

Coordinates: 38°24′02″N 87°45′01″W

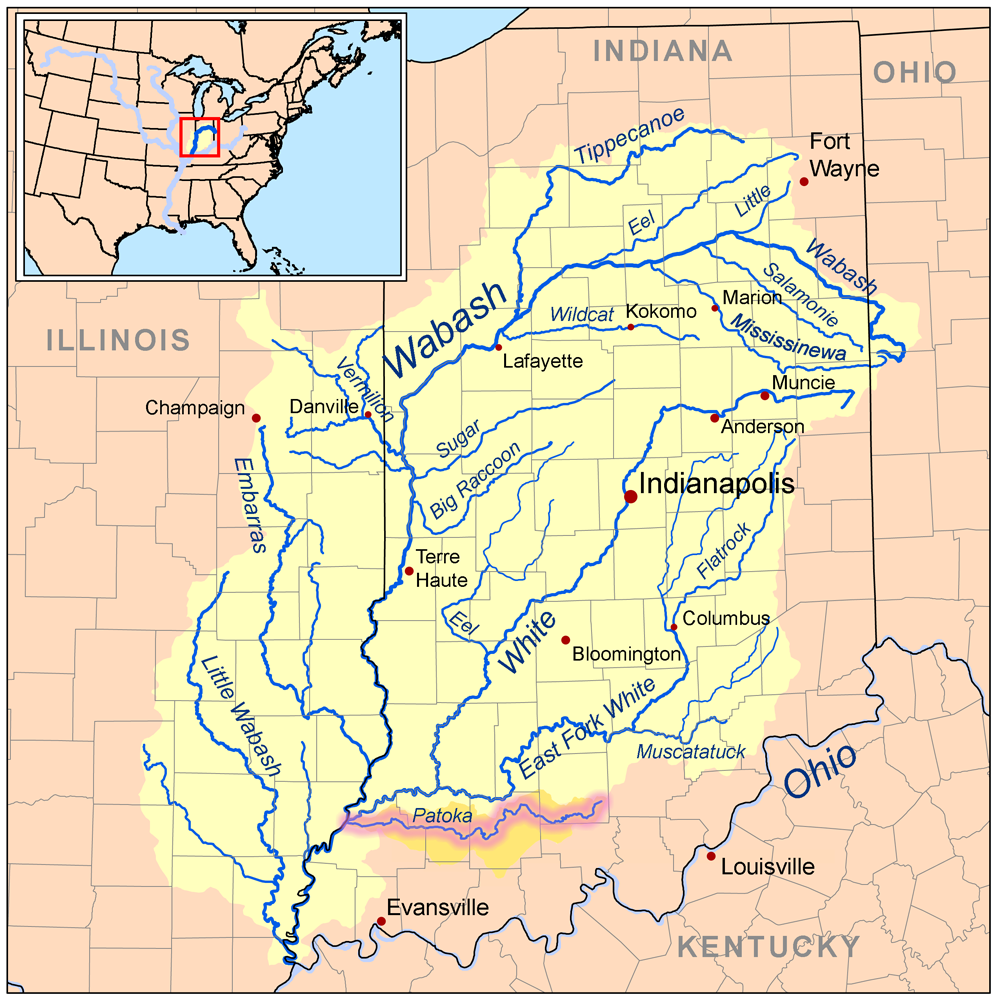
Map of the Patoka River highlighted within the Wabash River watershed

The Patoka River is a 167-mile-long (269 km) tributary of the Wabash River in southwestern Indiana in the United States. It drains a largely rural area of forested bottomland and agricultural lands among the hills north of Evansville.

== Description ==
It rises in the Hoosier National Forest in southeastern Orange County, approximately 10 miles (16 km) southeast of Paoli. It flows generally west, passing through Patoka Lake, where it is impounded for flood control. Downstream from the reservoir it flows in a highly meandering course, making large oxbows as it flows past sharp hilly terrain as it approaches Jasper, then westward across Pike and Gibson counties, passing through more sharp terrain. It joins the Wabash from the east opposite Mount Carmel, Illinois, approximately 30 miles (48 km) north-northwest of Evansville. The mouth of the river is approximately 1 mile (1.6 km) downstream on the Wabash from the mouth of the White River.

At Princeton, Indiana, the Patoka has a mean annual discharge of approximately 1,082 cubic feet per second.

The river once included highly diverse habitat that supported mussel, crayfish, and fish communities. A 1994 survey of 66 locations on the river concluded that about a third of the streams in the river's watershed were devoid of aquatic life . The decline in aquatic life is believed by most biologists to be a result of acidic runoff from strip mining, as well as spills and contamination from petroleum and natural gas exploration in its watershed. The remaining freshwater crayfish population of the river comprises four extant species, including the principal population of the Indiana crayfish (Orconectes indianensis). In 1994 approximately 30 miles (48 km) of the river were designated as the Patoka River National Wildlife Refuge and Management Area, managed by the U.S. Fish and Wildlife Service. The refuge contains one of the most significant bottomland hardwood forests remaining in the state. Interstate 69 passes through this area on a roughly 1.5-mile-long bridge through land deliberately set aside for the highway over environmentalist objections.

Patoka Lake is a major recreational destination in the region and includes four state parks along its shore.

The name "Patoka" is likely from the Miami-Illinois word paatohka ("Comanche"), which appears as a personal name in some historical records. Alternatively, it may be from the Munsee language word péhtakəw ("it thunders"), referring to the noisy waterfall at Jasper.

Crawford, Dubois, Gibson, and Pike counties each have a township named for the river.

== See also ==
- List of rivers of Indiana
