= National Register of Historic Places listings in Spencer County, Indiana =

Location of Spencer County in Indiana

This is a list of the National Register of Historic Places listings in Spencer County, Indiana.

This is intended to be a complete list of the properties and districts on the National Register of Historic Places in Spencer County, Indiana, United States. Latitude and longitude coordinates are provided for many National Register properties and districts; these locations may be seen together in a map.

There are 10 properties and districts listed on the National Register in the county, including one National Historic Landmark. Another two properties were once listed but have been removed.

Properties and districts located in incorporated areas display the name of the municipality, while properties and districts in unincorporated areas display the name of their civil township. Properties and districts split between multiple jurisdictions display the names of all jurisdictions.

This National Park Service list is complete through NPS recent listings posted December 19, 2025.

== Current listings ==
| | Name on the Register | Image | Date listed | Location | City or town | Description |
|---|---|---|---|---|---|---|
| 1 | Hardy-Baumgaertner House | | November 29, 2019 (#100004718) | 105 Walnut St. 37°52′56″N 87°02′44″W | Rockport | |
| 2 | Huffman Mill Covered Bridge | Huffman Mill Covered Bridge | April 1, 1998 (#98000299) | CR 1490N over the Anderson River, east of Fulda; 38°06′14″N 86°46′37″W | Harrison Township | Extends into Perry County |
| 3 | Colonel William Jones House | Colonel William Jones House | May 12, 1975 (#75000050) | West of Gentryville on Troy-Vincennes Rd. 38°06′51″N 87°02′34″W | Jackson Township | Part of Lincoln State Park |
| 4 | Lincoln Boyhood National Memorial | Lincoln Boyhood National Memorial | October 15, 1966 (#66000012) | State Road 162, southeast of Lincoln City; 38°07′06″N 86°59′49″W | Carter and Clay Townships | |
| 5 | Lincoln Pioneer Village | Lincoln Pioneer Village | April 20, 1998 (#98000305) | Junction of 9th St. and Eureka Rd. 37°52′48″N 87°03′28″W | Rockport | |
| 6 | Pyeatt's Mill Iron Bridge | Pyeatt's Mill Iron Bridge | August 23, 2022 (#100008058) | Boner Rd. crossing of Little Pigeon Cr. 37°56′32″N 87°15′07″W | Hatfield vicinity | Built 1869 by the King Bridge Company. Crosses into Warrick County. |
| 7 | Rockport Historic District | Rockport Historic District | August 28, 2019 (#100004359) | Roughly bounded by First St., Seminary St., a line from north to south following Greenwood St., Lincoln Ave. and Eighth St., and William and Pearl Sts., 37°53′00″N 87°02′58″W | Rockport | |
| 8 | St. Boniface Church | St. Boniface Church | October 23, 1980 (#80000065) | State Road 545 at Fulda; 38°06′41″N 86°50′08″W | Harrison Township | |
| 9 | Mathias Sharp House | Mathias Sharp House | June 16, 1983 (#83000148) | 319 S. 2nd St. 37°52′48″N 87°02′40″W | Rockport | |
| 10 | Spencer County Courthouse | Spencer County Courthouse | March 12, 1999 (#99000304) | Bounded by 2nd, 3rd, Main, and Walnut Sts. 37°52′57″N 87°02′47″W | Rockport | |

== Former listings ==
| | Name on the Register | Image | Date listed | Date removed | Location | City or town | Description |
|---|---|---|---|---|---|---|---|
| 1 | Brown-Kercheval House | | September 20, 1973 (#73000045) | April 28, 1994 | 315 S. 2nd St. | Rockport | Destroyed by fire in April 1994. |
| 2 | Deutsch Evangelische St. Paul's Kirche | Deutsch Evangelische St. Paul's Kirche | September 27, 1984 (#84001644) | November 13, 2012 | South of central Santa Claus on Santa Fe Rd. 38°06′40″N 86°54′33″W | Santa Claus | Moved to Santa Claus Park in 2012 |

== See also ==
- List of National Historic Landmarks in Indiana
- National Register of Historic Places listings in Indiana
- Listings in neighboring counties: Daviess (KY), Dubois, Hancock (KY), Perry, Warrick
- List of Indiana state historical markers in Spencer County
