= Indiana State Road 245 =

State highway in Indiana, United States

State Road 245
- SR 245 highlighted in red

Route information
- Maintained by INDOT
- Length: 13.577 mi (21.850 km)
- Existed: March 28, 1932–present

Major junctions
- South end: SR 70 near Newtonville
- North end: SR 62 near Dale

Location
- Country: United States
- State: Indiana
- Counties: Spencer

Highway system
- Indiana State Highway System; Interstate; US; State; Scenic
← SR 244	→ SR 246

State Road 245 in the U.S. state of Indiana is a two-lane north–south highway in that runs entirely within Spencer County in the southwest corner of the state.

== Route description ==
State Road 245 begins at State Road 70 east of Newtonville and runs north. Passing through Santa Claus, it is concurrent with State Road 162 and serves the Holiday World & Splashin' Safari theme park. Past the park, the concurrent routes run along Christmas Boulevard, while the northern stretch of State Road 245 that leads northwest out of town toward Dale is called Holiday Boulevard. State Road 245 ends at State Road 62 east of Dale.

== History ==
Until March 2001, State Road 245 was concurrent with State Road 70 west through Newtonville, then south to State Road 66 northeast of Grandview. This segment of highway was decommissioned by the state and is now a county road.

== Major intersections ==
The entire route is in Spencer County.

Location	mi	km	Destinations	Notes
Huff Township	0.000	0.000	SR 70	Southern terminus of SR 245
Santa Claus	8.432	13.570	SR 162 north – Ferdinand	Eastern end of SR 162 concurrency
Santa Claus	8.983	14.457	SR 162 west – Gentryville	Western end of SR 162 concurrency
Dale	13.577	21.850	SR 62 – Dale, Corydon	Northern terminus of SR 245
1.000 mi = 1.609 km; 1.000 km = 0.621 mi: Concurrency terminus
