= Indiana State Road 70 =

State highway in Indiana, United States

State Road 70
- SR 70 highlighted in red

Route information
- Maintained by INDOT
- Length: 15.271 mi (24.576 km)

Western segment
- Length: 9.116 mi (14.671 km)
- West end: US 231 near Chrisney
- East end: SR 66 near Troy

Eastern segment
- Length: 6.155 mi (9.906 km)
- West end: SR 37 in Gatchel
- East end: SR 66 in Derby

Location
- Country: United States
- State: Indiana
- Counties: Western Section; Spencer; Eastern Section; Perry

Highway system
- Indiana State Highway System; Interstate; US; State; Scenic
| ← I-70 | → SR 71 |

State Road 70 in the U.S. state of Indiana consists of two discontinuous east–west segments of two-lane rural roadway. State Road 70 passes through no cities or towns of significant size.

== Route description ==
=== Western segment ===
The western segment is about 10 miles (16 km) long and is relatively straight; it runs entirely within the boundaries of Spencer County, from U.S. Route 231 at the west end through the unincorporated town of Newtonville to State Road 66 at the east end.

=== Eastern segment ===
The eastern segment about 6.2 miles (10.0 km) long and is a more winding road than the western segment; it runs entirely within Perry County, from State Road 37 at the west end to State Road 66 in the community of Derby, on the banks of the Ohio River, at the east end.

== Major intersections ==
| County | Location | mi | km | Destinations | Notes |
|---|---|---|---|---|---|
| Spencer | Chrisney | 0.000 | 0.000 | US 231 – Rockport | Western terminus of SR 70 |
| Spencer | Huff Township | 6.443 | 10.369 | SR 245 north – Lamar, Santa Claus | Southern terminus of SR 245 |
| Spencer | Huff Township | 9.116 | 14.671 | SR 66 | Eastern terminus of the western section |
Gap in route
| Perry | Gatchel | 9.117 | 14.672 | SR 37 – Tell City, St. Croix | Western terminus of the eastern section |
| Perry | Derby | 15.271 | 24.576 | SR 66 – Rome, Marengo | Eastern terminus of SR 70 |
1.000 mi = 1.609 km; 1.000 km = 0.621 mi
