= List of Indiana state historical markers in Spencer County =

Location of Spencer County in Indiana

This is a list of the Indiana state historical markers in Spencer County.

This is intended to be a complete list of the official state historical markers placed in Spencer County, Indiana, United States by the Indiana Historical Bureau. The locations of the historical markers and their latitude and longitude coordinates are included below when available, along with their names, years of placement, and topics as recorded by the Historical Bureau. There are 4 historical markers located in Spencer County.

== Historical markers ==
Marker title	Image	Year placed	Location	Topics
James Gentry Sr.		1992	Northern side of State Road 162 in Lincoln State Park, 0.5 miles east of Gentryville and the junction of U.S. Route 231 and State Road 62; 38°6′48.6″N 87°1′14″W	Early Settlement and Exploration, Politics
Site of Rockport Tavern		1992	Southeastern corner of the junction of 2nd and Main Streets, across from the courthouse in Rockport; 37°52′59″N 87°2′45.6″W	Politics
David Turnham (1803–1884)		1995	Junction of State Road 162 and County Road 1625N, in front of Heritage Hills High School, near Lincoln City; 38°7′6″N 86°59′9″W	Early Settlement and Exploration, Politics
Abraham Lincoln Employed		2001	At the entrance to the Lincoln Ferry roadside park along State Road 66, 1 mile west of Troy; 38°0′0″N 86°48′53″W	Politics

== See also ==
- List of Indiana state historical markers
- National Register of Historic Places listings in Spencer County, Indiana
