= Indiana State Road 162 =

State highway in Indiana, United States

State Road 162
- William A. Koch Memorial Highway
- SR 162 highlighted in red

Route information
- Maintained by INDOT
- Length: 27.861 mi (44.838 km)

Major junctions
- West end: SR 62 at Gentryville
- US 231 near Lincoln City; I-64 in Ferdinand
- East end: US 231 at Jasper

Location
- Country: United States
- State: Indiana
- Counties: Dubois, Spencer

Highway system
- Indiana State Highway System; Interstate; US; State; Scenic
← SR 161	→ SR 163

State Road 162 in the U.S. state of Indiana is a 28-mile (45 km) route in Dubois and Spencer counties. Though an even-numbered route, in practice it is a north–south route for most of its length.

== Route description ==
State Road 162 begins at SR 62 in Gentryville. Going east, it passes through Lincoln City near the Lincoln Boyhood National Memorial, then through Santa Claus (near Holiday World & Splashin' Safari), and then goes north through Ferdinand (near Interstate 64 exit 63). It terminates in Jasper where it re-joins U.S. Route 231.

== History ==
The highway was designated the William A. Koch Memorial Highway in 2002 following the death of Bill Koch, who, along with his father, Louis J. Koch, was instrumental in creating the Holiday World & Splashin' Safari and the Lincoln Boyhood National Memorial. He was also the chief developer of the town of Santa Claus, Indiana, which has grown from less than 100 residents in 1960 to over 2,100 today.

== Major intersections ==
County	Location	mi	km	Destinations	Notes
Spencer	Gentryville	0.000	0.000	SR 62	Western terminus of SR 162
Spencer	Carter–Clay township line	3.047– 3.128	4.904– 5.034	US 231	
Spencer	Santa Claus	6.250	10.058	SR 245 north	Western end of SR 245 concurrency
Spencer	Santa Claus	6.802	10.947	SR 245 south	Eastern end of SR 245
Spencer	Harrison Township	11.216	18.050	SR 62 – Dale, St. Meinrad	
Dubois	Ferdinand	13.612– 13.764	21.906– 22.151	I-64 - St. Louis, Louisville	Exit number 63 on I-64
Dubois	Ferdinand	15.903	25.593	SR 264 east – Ferdinand State Forest	
Dubois	Jackson Township	20.586	33.130	SR 64 – Huntingburg, Birdseye	
Dubois	Jasper	27.861	44.838	US 231 – Huntingburg, Jasper	Eastern terminus of SR 162
1.000 mi = 1.609 km; 1.000 km = 0.621 mi: Concurrency terminus
