= List of public art in Spencer County, Indiana =

This is a list of public art in Spencer County, Indiana.

This list applies only to works of public art accessible in an outdoor public space. For example, this does not include artwork visible inside a museum.

Most of the works mentioned are sculptures. When this is not the case (e.g., sound installation,) it is stated next to the title.

== Lincoln City ==
Title	Artist	Year	Location/GPS Coordinates	Material	Dimensions	Owner	Image
Cabin Site Memorial	Thomas Hibben	1935	Lincoln Boyhood National Memorial 38°7′0.96″N 86°59′50.28″W	Bronze & Sandstone or Limestone	Sculpture: approx. 56 in. x 17 1/2 ft. x 20 ft.; Wall: approx. 50 in. x 36 ft. 8 in. x 42 ft. 8 in.	National Park Service	
Nancy Hanks Lincoln Gravestone	Alfred H. Yates	1879	Lincoln Boyhood National Memorial	Italian marble	Gravestone: approx. 46 x 20.5 x 5 in.	National Park Service	

== Mariah Hill ==
Title	Artist	Year	Location/GPS Coordinates	Material	Dimensions	Owner	Image
Crucifix	A. Shum (fabricator)	1892	Cemetery	Limestone	Approx. 9 ft x 78 in. x 2 ft.	Mary Help of Christians	

== Saint Meinrad ==
Title	Artist	Year	Location/GPS Coordinates	Material	Dimensions	Owner	Image
Blessed Virgin Mary	Timothy Kennedy		St. Meinrad Archabbey	Ceramic	Approx. 5 ft. 10 in. x 1 ft. 4 in. x 10 in.	St. Meinrad Archabbey	
Christ the King	Herbert Jogerst	ca. 1950s	St. Meinrad Archabbey	Travertine, Concrete & Copper	Figure: approx. 7 ft. 3 in. x 3 ft. x 1 ft. 4 in.	St. Meinrad Archabbey	
Our Lady	Herbert Jogerst	1954	St. Meinrad Archabbey	Tennessee marble	Approx. 7 ft. 2 in. x 3 ft. x 3 ft.	St. Meinrad Archabbey	
Our Lady of the Press	Herbert Jogerst	ca. 1955	St. Meinrad Archabbey	Limestone	Sculpture: approx. 65 x 64 x 14 in.	St. Meinrad Archabbey	
Relief panels	Herbert Jogerst	ca. 1952	St. Meinrad Archabbey	Sandstone	Each panel: approx. 6 x 3 x 3 ft.	St. Meinrad Archabbey	
St. Bede	Herbert Jogerst	1954	St. Meinrad Archabbey	Limestone	Sculpture: approx. 12 ft. 6 in. x 2 ft. 2 in. x 2 ft. 5 1/2 in.	St. Meinrad Archabbey	
St. Benedict	Herbert Jogerst	1954	St. Meinrad Archabbey 38°9′58.36″N 86°48′39.19″W	Marble	Approx. 8 x 2 1/2 x 2 ft.	St. Meinrad Archabbey	
St. Scholastica	Herbert Jogerst	1954	St. Meinrad Archabbey38°9′58.36″N 86°48′39.19″W	Marble	Approx. 8 x 2 1/2 x 2 ft.	St. Meinrad Archabbey	
St. Thomas Aquinas	Unknown		St. Meinrad Archabbey	Marble	Approx. 6 ft. x 32 in. x 22 in.	St. Meinrad Archabbey	-

== Santa Claus ==
Title	Artist	Year	Location/GPS Coordinates	Material	Dimensions	Owner	Image
Santa Claus	Carl Barrett	1935	Santa Claus Town Hall38°7′17.45″N 86°55′22.76″W	Concrete	Sculpture: approx. 22 ft. 3 in. x 64 in. x 70 in.		
