= Midway, Spencer County, Indiana =

Midway
- Unincorporated community
- Location within Indiana Location within the United States
- Coordinates: 37°59′58″N 87°08′18″W
- Country: United States
- State: Indiana
- County: Spencer
- Township: Grass
- Elevation: 394 ft (120 m)
- Time zone: UTC-6 (Central (CST))
  - Summer (DST): UTC-5 (CDT)
- ZIP code: 47634
- Area code: 812
- GNIS feature ID: 439126

Midway is an unincorporated community in Grass Township, Spencer County, in the U.S. state of Indiana.

== History ==
A post office was established at Midway in 1831, and remained in operation until it was discontinued in 1905. The community was laid out in 1854.

== Geography ==
Midway is located 5.7 miles (9.2 km) west-southwest of Chrisney.
