= Santa Fe, Spencer County, Indiana =

Santa Fe
- Unincorporated community
- Location within Indiana Location within the United States
- Coordinates: 38°06′41″N 86°54′28″W
- Country: United States
- State: Indiana
- County: Spencer
- Township: Clay
- Elevation: 469 ft (143 m)
- Time zone: UTC-6 (Central (CST))
  - Summer (DST): UTC-5 (CDT)
- ZIP code: 47579
- Area code: 812
- GNIS feature ID: 443022

Santa Fe is an unincorporated community in Clay Township, Spencer County, in the U.S. state of Indiana.

== History ==
Santa Fe was laid out in 1846.
