= Luce Township, Spencer County, Indiana =

Luce Township
- Township
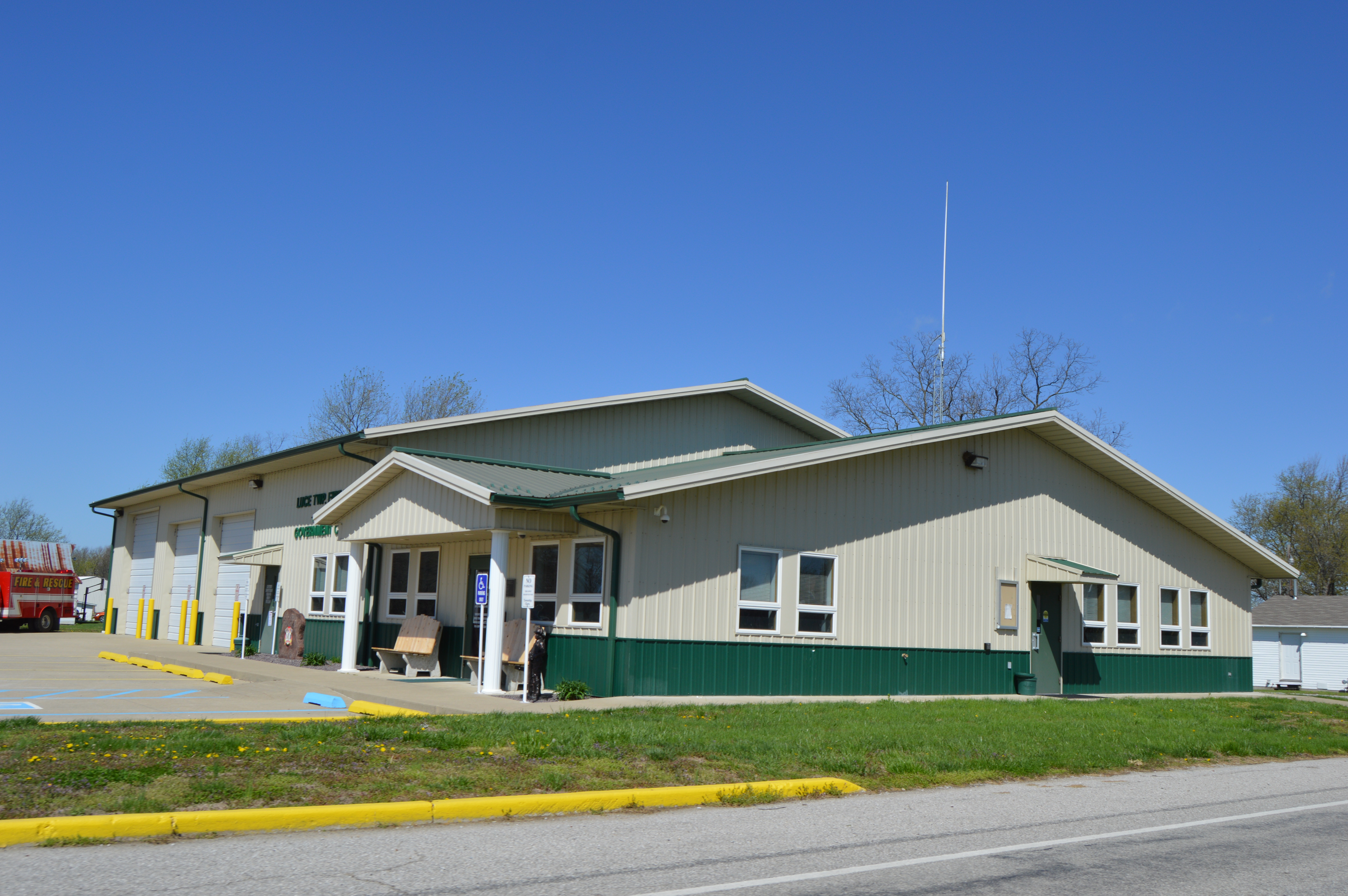
- Township hall and fire station in Richland City

- Coordinates: 37°54′47″N 87°12′04″W
- Country: United States
- State: Indiana
- County: Spencer

Government
  - Type: Indiana township

Area
  - Total: 53.32 sq mi (138.1 km^{2})
  - Land: 53.12 sq mi (137.6 km^{2})
  - Water: 0.19 sq mi (0.49 km^{2})
- Elevation: 390 ft (119 m)

Population (2020)
  - Total: 2,389
  - Density: 44.97/sq mi (17.36/km^{2})
- FIPS code: 18-45216
- GNIS feature ID: 453584
- Website: www.in.gov/townships/luce74/

Luce Township is one of nine townships in Spencer County, Indiana. As of the 2020 census, its population was 2,389 and it contained 1,073 housing units.

Historical population
Census	Pop.	Note	%±
1890	2,907		—
1900	3,088		6.2%
1910	2,930		−5.1%
1920	2,431		−17.0%
1930	2,296		−5.6%
1940	2,179		−5.1%
1950	2,159		−0.9%
1960	2,349		8.8%
1970	2,718		15.7%
1980	2,981		9.7%
1990	2,862		−4.0%
2000	2,694		−5.9%
2010	2,572		−4.5%
2020	2,389		−7.1%
Source: US Decennial Census

== History ==
Luce Township was first settled about 1810; David Luce was among the first pioneer settlers.

== Geography ==
According to the 2010 census, the township has a total area of 53.32 square miles (138.1 km^{2}), of which 53.12 square miles (137.6 km^{2}) (or 99.62%) is land and 0.19 square miles (0.49 km^{2}) (or 0.36%) is water.

=== Cities and towns ===
- Richland City

=== Unincorporated towns ===
- Enterprise
- Eureka
- Hatfield
- Pyeattville
- Sand Ridge

== Education ==
Luce Township is in South Spencer County School Corporation.

Prior to 1965, Luce Township had its own high school. The school colors were red and white, and the mascot was the Red Devils. It absorbed students from the former Grandview High School in 1943. In 1965, it merged into South Spencer High School.
