= Kercheval =

Kercheval is a surname. Notable people with the surname include:

- Albert Fenner Kercheval (1829–1893), American farmer and poet
- Jesse Lee Kercheval (born 1956), American academic and writer
- Ken Kercheval (1935–2019), American actor
- Ralph Kercheval (1911–2010), American football player
- Samuel Kercheval (1767–1845), American lawyer and friend of Thomas Jefferson
- Thomas A. Kercheval (1837–1915), American politician

== See also ==
- Kercheval, Indiana, unincorporated community, United States
