= Liberal, Indiana =

- Unincorporated community
- Location within Indiana Location within the United States
- Coordinates: 38°02′45″N 86°56′35″W
- Country: United States
- State: Indiana
- County: Spencer
- Township: Clay
- Elevation: 433 ft (132 m)
- Time zone: UTC-6 (Central (CST))
  - Summer (DST): UTC-5 (CDT)
- ZIP code: 47550
- Area codes: 812, 930
- GNIS feature ID: 437815

Liberal is an unincorporated community in Clay Township, Spencer County, in the U.S. state of Indiana.

== History ==
A post office was established at Liberal in 1887, and remained in operation until it was discontinued in 1907.

== Geography ==
Liberal is located at 38°02′45″N 86°56′35″W.
