= Thermwood Corporation =

American industrial company

- Company type: Public TOOD
- Industry: CNC Routers and Software
- Founded: Dale, Indiana, U.S. (1969)
- Headquarters: Dale, Indiana, USA
- Key people: Kenneth J. Susnjara (chairman and CEO) David J. Hildenbrand (President) Dennis Palmer (Vice President of Sales)
- Revenue: ▲US$ 22.37 Million (2009)
- Net income: ▼US$ -858,000 (2009)
- Number of employees: Unknown
- Website: www.thermwood.com

Thermwood Corporation was founded in 1969 in Dale, Indiana. It was established as a "plastic molder of wood grained parts for the furniture industry."

== Early years ==
Thermwood incorporates a lot of technology into its business. It developed a unique molding process to make its plastic parts. Most of its plastic molding and trimming machinery is designed and built in-house. In the 1970s, Thermwood developed CNC machine tool control and used it to create machinery that would trim its plastic parts. It began selling this trim equipment for various applications and the CNC router was created. Thermwood is now known as one of the oldest CNC router companies.

== Uses ==
Its machines are used for many applications in the wood, furniture, and cabinet industries, but are also used for other well-known products. Its products are also used to create the interior of commercial airliners, helicopter blades, parts for military aircraft, and underlayment for Space Shuttles. Its machines create parts for bowling alleys, bicycle helmets, spas, motorcycle parts, and truck bodies. They are also used on Broadway sets, including Batman, Jurassic Park 3, and Star Wars.

Its products have helped rebuild Windsor Castle and the Opera House in London. They were also used by NASA to produce the Mars Lander.

== Technology ==
Thermwood is also involved in CNC technology and technology development. It includes a lot of next generation technology into its products. It is the only CNC router company in the world that creates its own high-end CNC control. It has more patents than all other CNC router companies combined. Its control has become a widely used standard in aerospace and defense applications.

== Products and services ==
Thermwood develops, manufactures, and distributes technology based products for manufacturing companies. It targets the woodworking, aerospace, molding, plastics, and composites industries, as well as the boating, entertainment, and medical industries.

Its main products are based around the CNC router market. Its product offering includes machines, hardware, tooling, software, components and materials. Its CNC routers are sold through a dealership network. It also manages over 25,000 custom cabinet shops called eCabinet Systems. It supplies these shops with advanced cabinet design and room layout software for free.

== Facilities ==
Thermwood's corporate headquarters are located in Dale, Indiana. Its main facility consists of 175,000 square feet (16,300 m^{2}), which includes an office/showroom, and an engineering and manufacturing plant. It has a second building 1-mile (1.6 km) north of Dale which contains the software development team. The 20.400-square-foot (1.8952 m^{2}), two-story office/showroom contains executive offices, dining rooms, conference rooms, a showroom, and customer demonstration area. It also has rooms for formal training classes. It also contains the IT department for the company. This part of the building has the web servers and network hardware for the company.

Its modern manufacturing facility does many processes from steel cutting, bending, forming and welding. It also does electronic board assembly and CNC control manufacturing. Thermwood develops most of the systems in-house. It uses many advanced manufacturing techniques including "finite element analysis, vibration stress relief and three-dimensional laser interferometers."

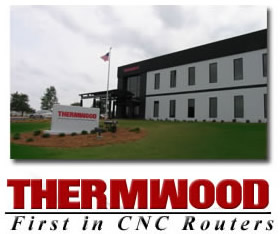
Image of Thermwood Corporation headquarters and logo

== Competition ==
According to Hoover's, an online D&B company, Thermwood's competitors include:

- Georg Fischer AG, based in Schaffhausen, Switzerland
- Giddings & Lewis Machine Tools, LLC based in Fond du Lac, WI, United States
- PMC Global, Inc. based in Sun Valley, CA, United States

== Mergers, acquisitions, and divestitures ==
While Thermwood hasn't merged into or acquired any other companies, it has had one divestiture. It sold its Digital Sky division, an avionics division, to King Radio Corp., for an undisclosed sum.
