= Clay City, Spencer County, Indiana =

Clay City
- Unincorporated community
- Location within Indiana Location within the United States
- Coordinates: 38°04′57″N 86°57′06″W
- Country: United States
- State: Indiana
- County: Spencer
- Township: Clay
- Elevation: 449 ft (137 m)
- Time zone: UTC-6 (Central (CST))
  - Summer (DST): UTC-5 (CDT)
- ZIP code: 47550
- Area code: 812
- GNIS feature ID: 432584

Clay City is an unincorporated community in Clay Township, Spencer County, in the U.S. state of Indiana.

== Geography ==
Clay City is located at 38°04′57″N 86°57′06″W.
