= 62nd Indiana Infantry Regiment =

- Active: 1862
- Country: United States
- Allegiance: Union
- Branch: Infantry
- Size: Regiment
- Engagements: American Civil War

The 62nd Indiana Infantry Regiment was an infantry regiment from Rockport, Indiana that failed to complete its organization to serve in the Union Army during the American Civil War. The enlisted men were transferred to the 53rd Indiana Infantry Regiment on February 26, 1862.

One member, Colonel William Jones was a neighbor of young Abraham Lincoln; one of Lincoln's first jobs was working for Jones in Jones' general store. Jones was killed during the Battle of Atlanta in 1864.

== See also ==
- List of Indiana Civil War regiments

== Bibliography ==
- Dyer, Frederick H. (1959). A Compendium of the War of the Rebellion. New York and London. Thomas Yoseloff, Publisher. LCCN 59-12963.
