= Maxville, Spencer County, Indiana =

Maxville
- Unincorporated community
- Location within Indiana Location within the United States
- Coordinates: 38°0′0.2″N 86°48′48.0″W
- Country: United States
- State: Indiana
- County: Spencer
- Township: Huff
- Elevation: 397 ft (121 m)
- Time zone: UTC-6 (Central (CST))
  - Summer (DST): UTC-5 (CDT)
- ZIP code: 47531
- Area code: 812
- GNIS feature ID: 438749

Maxville is an unincorporated community in Huff Township, Spencer County, in the U.S. state of Indiana.

== History ==
Maxville was laid out in 1841. The community probably derives its name from the founder, James McDaniel.
