= Grass Township, Spencer County, Indiana =

Grass Township
- Township
- Coordinates: 38°00′08″N 88°0′0″W
- Country: United States
- State: Indiana
- County: Spencer

Government
  - Type: Indiana township

Area
  - Total: 45.69 sq mi (118.3 km^{2})
  - Land: 45.36 sq mi (117.5 km^{2})
  - Water: 0.33 sq mi (0.85 km^{2})
- Elevation: 453 ft (138 m)

Population (2020)
  - Total: 1,113
  - Density: 24.54/sq mi (9.474/km^{2})
- FIPS code: 18-28944
- GNIS feature ID: 453338

Grass Township is one of nine townships in Spencer County, Indiana. As of the 2020 census, its population was 1,113 and it contained 514 housing units. Grass Township contains the city of Chrisney.

Historical population
Census	Pop.	Note	%±
1890	2,167		—
1900	2,294		5.9%
1910	2,221		−3.2%
1920	1,906		−14.2%
1930	1,633		−14.3%
1940	1,548		−5.2%
1950	1,535		−0.8%
1960	1,405		−8.5%
1970	1,513		7.7%
1980	1,387		−8.3%
1990	1,456		5.0%
2000	1,390		−4.5%
2010	1,241		−10.7%
2020	1,113		−10.3%
Source: US Decennial Census

== History ==
Grass Township was founded about 1816, and named for Daniel Grass. Daniel Grass was one of the first pioneer settlers in the area.

== Geography ==
According to the 2010 census, the township has a total area of 45.69 square miles (118.3 km^{2}), of which 45.36 square miles (117.5 km^{2}) (or 99.28%) is land and 0.33 square miles (0.85 km^{2}) (or 0.72%) is water.

=== Cities and towns ===
- Chrisney

=== Unincorporated towns ===
- Bloomfield
- Centerville
- Midway
