= New Boston, Spencer County, Indiana =

New Boston
- Unincorporated community
- Location within Indiana Location within the United States
- Coordinates: 38°03′31″N 86°48′37″W
- Country: United States
- State: Indiana
- County: Spencer
- Township: Huff
- Elevation: 459 ft (140 m)
- Time zone: UTC-6 (Central (CST))
  - Summer (DST): UTC-5 (CDT)
- ZIP code: 47531
- Area code: 812
- GNIS feature ID: 440025

New Boston is an unincorporated community in Huff Township, Spencer County, in the U.S. state of Indiana.

== History ==
New Boston was laid out in 1851. The community most likely took its name from the larger city of Boston, Massachusetts.

A post office was established at New Boston in 1852, and remained in operation until it was discontinued in 1868.

== Geography ==
New Boston is located at 38°03′31″N 86°48′37″W.
