= Evanston, Indiana =

- Unincorporated community
- Location within Indiana Location within the United States
- Coordinates: 38°02′22″N 86°50′30″W
- Country: United States
- State: Indiana
- County: Spencer
- Township: Huff
- Elevation: 413 ft (126 m)
- Time zone: UTC-6 (Central (CST))
  - Summer (DST): UTC-5 (CDT)
- ZIP code: 47531
- Area codes: 812, 930
- GNIS feature ID: 434257

Evanston is an unincorporated community in Huff Township, Spencer County, in the U.S. state of Indiana.

== History ==
A post office was established at Evanston in 1891, and remained in operation until it was discontinued in 1989.

== Geography ==
Evanston is located at 38°02′22″N 86°50′30″W at an elevation of 413 feet.

The nearest city is Tell City.
