= Hammond Township, Spencer County, Indiana =

Hammond Township
- Township
- Coordinates: 37°58′46″N 86°57′35″W
- Country: United States
- State: Indiana
- County: Spencer

Government
  - Type: Indiana township

Area
  - Total: 42.1 sq mi (109 km^{2})
  - Land: 40.92 sq mi (106.0 km^{2})
  - Water: 1.17 sq mi (3.0 km^{2})
- Elevation: 400 ft (122 m)

Population (2020)
  - Total: 1,579
  - Density: 38.59/sq mi (14.90/km^{2})
- FIPS code: 18-31018
- GNIS feature ID: 453367

Hammond Township is one of nine townships in Spencer County, Indiana. As of the 2020 census, its population was 1,579 and it contained 694 housing units. Hammond Township contains the city of Grandview.

Historical population
Census	Pop.	Note	%±
1890	2,629		—
1900	2,800		6.5%
1910	2,355		−15.9%
1920	2,105		−10.6%
1930	1,788		−15.1%
1940	1,770		−1.0%
1950	1,685		−4.8%
1960	1,457		−13.5%
1970	1,535		5.4%
1980	1,653		7.7%
1990	1,667		0.8%
2000	1,607		−3.6%
2010	1,727		7.5%
2020	1,579		−8.6%
Source: US Decennial Census

== History ==
The Hammond family settled in Hammond Township in about 1814.

== Geography ==
According to the 2010 census, the township has a total area of 42.1 square miles (109 km^{2}), of which 40.92 square miles (106.0 km^{2}) (or 97.20%) is land and 1.17 square miles (3.0 km^{2}) (or 2.78%) is water.

=== Cities and towns ===
- Grandview

=== Unincorporated towns ===
- Newtonville
