= Sand Ridge, Indiana =

- Unincorporated community
- Location within Indiana Location within the United States
- Coordinates: 37°54′09″N 87°10′07″W
- Country: United States
- State: Indiana
- County: Spencer
- Township: Luce
- Elevation: 430 ft (131 m)
- Time zone: UTC-6 (Central (CST))
  - Summer (DST): UTC-5 (CDT)
- ZIP code: 47634
- Area codes: 812, 930
- GNIS feature ID: 442984

Sand Ridge is an unincorporated community in Luce Township, Spencer County, in the U.S. state of Indiana.

== History ==
Sand Ridge took its name from a sandy ridge near the original town site.

== Geography ==
Sand Ridge is located at 37°54′09″N 87°10′07″W.
