= Bloomfield, Spencer County, Indiana =

Bloomfield
- Unincorporated community
- Location within Indiana Location within the United States
- Coordinates: 38°01′28″N 87°05′47″W
- Country: United States
- State: Indiana
- County: Spencer
- Township: Grass
- Elevation: 440 ft (130 m)
- Time zone: UTC-6 (Central (CST))
  - Summer (DST): UTC-5 (CDT)
- ZIP code: 47611
- Area code: 812
- GNIS feature ID: 431199

Bloomfield is an unincorporated community in Grass Township, Spencer County, in the U.S. state of Indiana.

== History ==
Bloomfield was laid out in 1853. Bloomfield once contained a post office under the name Grass. This post office was in operation from 1878 until 1904.
