= Enterprise, Indiana =

- Unincorporated community
- Location within Indiana Location within the United States
- Coordinates: 37°50′33″N 87°10′55″W
- Country: United States
- State: Indiana
- County: Spencer
- Township: Luce
- Elevation: 371 ft (113 m)
- Time zone: UTC-6 (Central (CST))
  - Summer (DST): UTC-5 (CDT)
- ZIP code: 47635
- Area codes: 812, 930
- GNIS feature ID: 434218

Enterprise is an unincorporated community in Luce Township, Spencer County, in the U.S. state of Indiana.

== History ==
The first store opened in Enterprise in the 1830s, and the community was a landing stop for river boats in the mid-19th century. The town wasn't officially laid out until 1862. A post office was established at Enterprise in 1852, and remained in operation until it was discontinued in 1915.

== Geography ==
Enterprise is located at 37°50′33″N 87°10′55″W.
