= Eureka, Spencer County, Indiana =

Eureka
- Unincorporated community
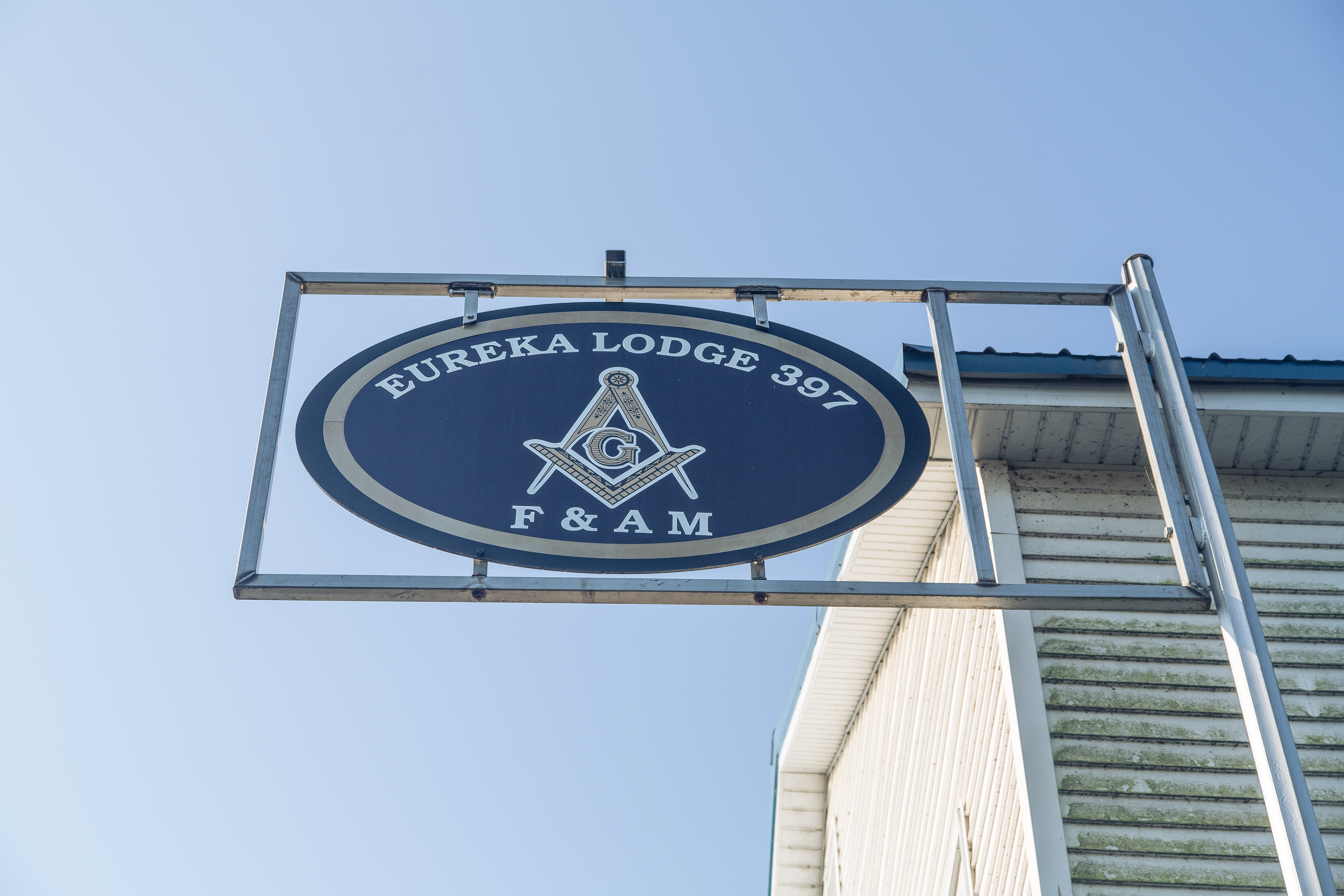

- Location within Indiana Location within the United States
- Coordinates: 37°52′50″N 87°12′54″W
- Country: United States
- State: Indiana
- County: Spencer
- Township: Luce
- Elevation: 390 ft (120 m)
- Time zone: UTC-6 (Central (CST))
  - Summer (DST): UTC-5 (CDT)
- ZIP code: 47635
- Area code: 812
- FIPS code: 18-21592
- GNIS feature ID: 434247

Eureka is an unincorporated community in Luce Township, Spencer County, in the U.S. state of Indiana.

== History ==
Eureka was laid out in 1858. A post office was established at Eureka in 1872, and remained in operation until it was discontinued in 1921. Tradition has it the community was so named after a pioneer exclaimed "Eureka!" when he came upon the site.

== Geography ==
Eureka is located at 37°52′50″N 87°12′54″W.

=== Climate ===
The climate in this area is characterized by hot, humid summers and generally mild to cool winters. According to the Köppen Climate Classification system, Eureka has a humid subtropical climate, abbreviated "Cfa" on climate maps.
