= Indiana State Road 264 =

State highway in Indiana, United States

State Road 264
- SR 264 highlighted in red

Route information
- Maintained by INDOT
- Length: 4.859 mi (7.820 km)

Major junctions
- West end: SR 162 in Ferdinand
- East end: Ferdinand State Forest

Location
- Country: United States
- State: Indiana
- Counties: Dubois

Highway system
- Indiana State Highway System; Interstate; US; State; Scenic
← SR 263	→ I-265

State Road 264 is a short two-lane road in southeast Dubois County in the U.S. state of Indiana.

== Route description ==
State Road 264 begins at the north end of the town of Ferdinand at State Road 162, which is concurrent with Main Street. Going east and slightly north, it is concurrent with East 23rd Street until it leaves the city limits after 0.7 miles. It continues east-northeast and winds among several wooded areas until it reaches the Ferdinand State Forest.

== Major intersections ==
The entire route is in Dubois County.

Location	mi	km	Destinations	Notes
Ferdinand	0.000	0.000	SR 162 – Ferdinand, Jasper	Western terminus of SR 264
Ferdinand Township	4.859	7.820	Ferdinand State Forest; CR 600 East	Eastern terminus of SR 264
1.000 mi = 1.609 km; 1.000 km = 0.621 mi
