= Richland, Spencer County, Indiana =

Richland, Indiana Richland City
- Town
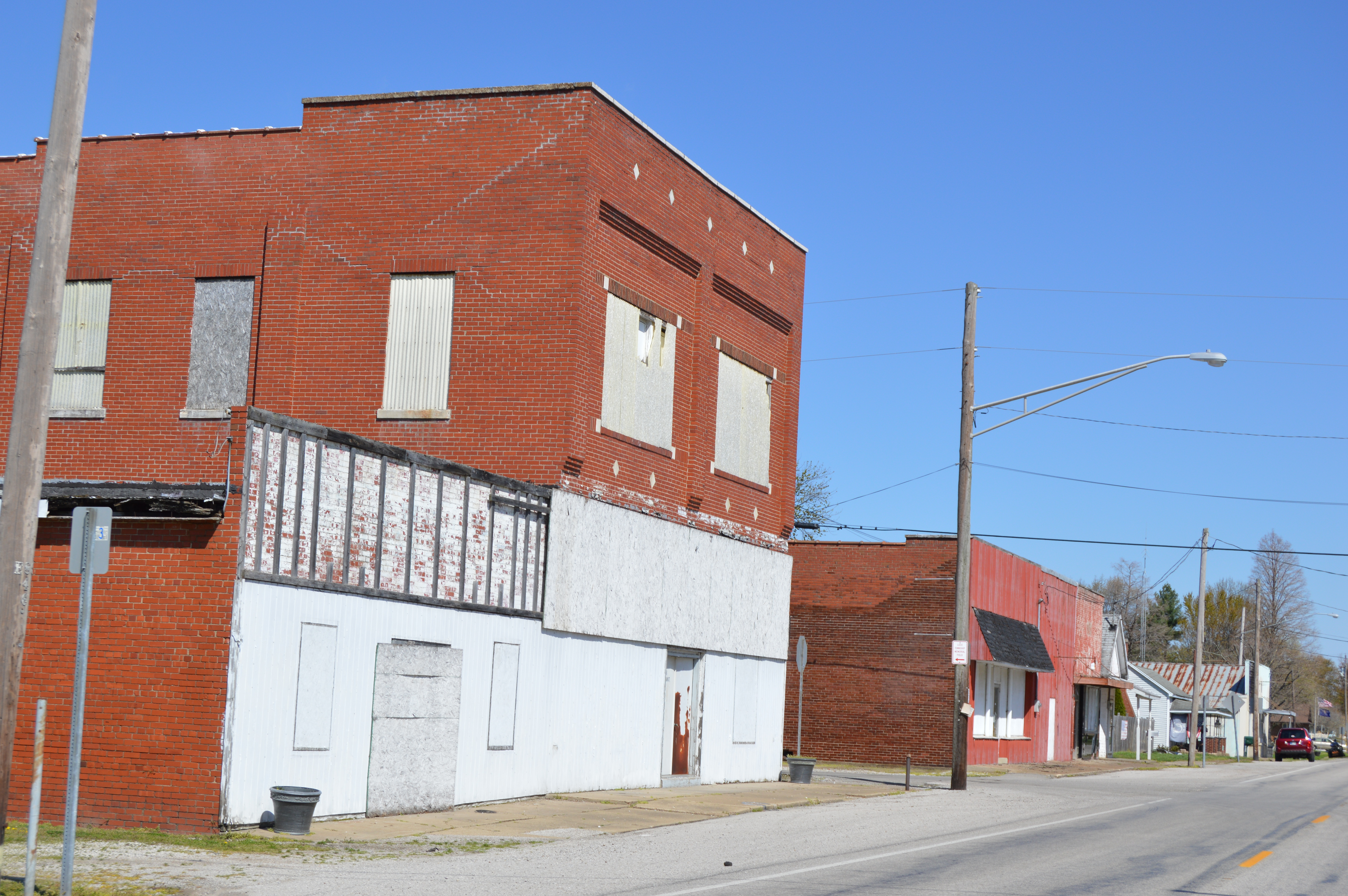
- Main Street at Adams Street

- Location of Richland in Spencer County, Indiana.
- Coordinates: 37°56′43″N 87°10′04″W
- Country: United States
- State: Indiana
- County: Spencer
- Township: Luce

Area
  - Total: 0.51 sq mi (1.33 km^{2})
  - Land: 0.51 sq mi (1.33 km^{2})
  - Water: 0 sq mi (0.00 km^{2})
- Elevation: 390 ft (120 m)

Population (2020)
  - Total: 403
  - Density: 782.6/sq mi (302.18/km^{2})
- Time zone: UTC-6 (Central (CST))
  - Summer (DST): UTC-5 (CDT)
- ZIP code: 47634
- FIPS code: 18-64206
- GNIS feature ID: 441965
- Website: Official website

Richland is a town in Luce Township, Spencer County, in the U.S. state of Indiana. Until 2008, it was an unincorporated community; the town's residents voted to incorporate in the November 2008 general election. The population was 403 at the 2020 census.

The town is developing plans to offer certain services to its residents. Police protection will not be provided by the town, but through an arrangement with the Spencer County Sheriff's Department.

== History ==
Richland was laid out in 1861. The town was so named on account of their fertile soil.

The first post office was established in 1862, under the name Lake. It was renamed Richland in 1921, and has still been operating since.

== Geography ==
Richland is located at 37°56′43″N 87°10′04″W.

According to the United States Census Bureau, the town has a total area of 0.52 square miles (1.35 km^{2}), all land.

== Demographics ==
Historical population
Census	Pop.	Note	%±
2010	425		—
2020	403		−5.2%
U.S. Decennial Census

=== 2010 census ===
As of the census of 2010, there were 425 people, 170 households, and 121 families residing in the town. The population density was 817.3 inhabitants per square mile (315.6/km^{2}). There were 194 housing units at an average density of 373.1 per square mile (144.1/km^{2}). The racial makeup of the town was 98.6% White, 0.2% African American, 0.5% Native American, and 0.7% from two or more races. Hispanic or Latino of any race were 1.2% of the population.

There were 170 households, of which 41.2% had children under the age of 18 living with them, 56.5% were married couples living together, 9.4% had a female householder with no husband present, 5.3% had a male householder with no wife present, and 28.8% were non-families. 23.5% of all households were made up of individuals, and 11.1% had someone living alone who was 65 years of age or older. The average household size was 2.50 and the average family size was 2.99.

The median age in the town was 35.2 years. 28% of residents were under the age of 18; 5.7% were between the ages of 18 and 24; 25.8% were from 25 to 44; 28.5% were from 45 to 64; and 12% were 65 years of age or older. The gender makeup of the town was 50.1% male and 49.9% female.

== Education ==
Richland is in South Spencer County School Corporation

Prior to 1965, Luce Township had its own high school. The school colors were red and white, and the mascot was the Red Devils. That year, it merged into South Spencer High School.

Richland has a public library, a branch of Spencer County Public Library.
