= Centerville, Spencer County, Indiana =

Centerville
- Unincorporated community
- Location within Indiana Location within the United States
- Coordinates: 37°59′39″N 87°03′48″W
- Country: United States
- State: Indiana
- County: Spencer
- Township: Grass
- Elevation: 456 ft (139 m)
- Time zone: UTC-6 (Central (CST))
  - Summer (DST): UTC-5 (CDT)
- ZIP code: 47635
- Area code: 812
- GNIS feature ID: 432345

Centerville is an unincorporated community in Grass Township, Spencer County, in the U.S. state of Indiana.

== History ==
Centerville had its start in the early 1840s. An old variant name of the community was Oakland. A post office called Oakland was established in 1847, and remained in operation until it was discontinued in 1895.

== Geography ==
Centerville is located at 37°59′39″N 87°03′48″W.
