= Buffaloville, Indiana =

- Unincorporated community
- Location within Indiana Location within the United States
- Coordinates: 38°05′51″N 86°57′55″W
- Country: United States
- State: Indiana
- County: Spencer
- Township: Clay
- Elevation: 453 ft (138 m)
- Time zone: UTC-6 (Central (CST))
  - Summer (DST): UTC-5 (CDT)
- ZIP code: 47550
- Area codes: 812, 930
- GNIS feature ID: 431777

Buffaloville is an unincorporated community in Clay Township, Spencer County, in the U.S. state of Indiana.

== History ==
Buffaloville was formerly called Buffalo. The town was laid out in 1860 as Buffalo. A post office was established in 1860 as Buffalo, the post office was renamed that same year to Buffaloville, and the post office was discontinued in 1982.
