= Pyeattville, Indiana =

- Unincorporated community
- Location within Indiana Location within the United States
- Coordinates: 37°56′24″N 87°15′06″W
- Country: United States
- State: Indiana
- County: Spencer
- Township: Luce
- Elevation: 371 ft (113 m)
- Time zone: UTC-6 (Central (CST))
  - Summer (DST): UTC-5 (CDT)
- ZIP code: 47634
- Area codes: 812, 930
- GNIS feature ID: 447931

Pyeattville is an unincorporated community in Luce Township, Spencer County, in the U.S. state of Indiana.

== History ==
Pyeattville contained a gristmill in the 19th century on Little Pigeon River.
