= Lynching of Bud Rowland, Jim Henderson, and John Rolla =

Lynching of three Black men in Indiana

- Date: December 16–17, 1900
- Location: Rockport, Indiana Boonville, Indiana
- Type: Lynching
- Motive: Suspicion of murder, racial hatred
- Target: Bud Rowland, Jim Henderson, John Rolla
- Perpetrator: Local towns people
- Deaths: 3

Bud Rowland and Jim Henderson, two Black men, were lynched in Rockport, Indiana, United States on December 16, 1900. The following day, John Rolla was lynched in Boonville, Indiana for the same alleged crime.

== Lynching ==
On December 16, 1900, Bud Rowland and Jim Henderson, two Black men, were arrested for the murder of a white barber, Hollie L. Simmons in Rockport, Indiana. He was reportedly jumped by two men and was bashed across the skull with a nail-covered club. The news of the murder spread through town, and suspects were quickly identified that same night. Of those who were questioned, Henderson and Rowland were arrested in Rockport.

Shortly after authorities placed Rowland and Henderson in the local jail, a large group of angry white people used sledgehammers and a broken telegraph pole to ram into the jail. While the mob was getting ready to hang Rowland, he said that he had one more accomplice named ‘Crowfoot’. The white crowd first pulled Rowland out of his cell and hanged him from a tree on the east side of the courthouse, before shooting his body with bullets. The group returned to retrieve Henderson from his cell. They shot him in his cell, dragged him across the courtyard, and hanged him next to Rowland.

After lynching Rowland and Henderson, the white crowd looked for John Rolla under the name ‘Crowfoot,’ who identified himself as Joe Holly, at a local hotel. Rolla was known by several names, including "Joe Crowfoot", "Hustling Joe", and "Whistling Joe".

News spread that the Spencer County sheriffs took Rolla to a jail in the town over, Boonville. On the night of December 17, a crowd of white people from Rockport broke into the Boonville jail. Although Rolla pled for mercy, the angry crowd hanged him in front of the Boonville Courthouse. Although not much is known about Rolla, it is known that he was from Edmondson, Arkansas. Rolla's last wish was to have his body sent to his family, which was never granted. Even less is known about Rowland and Henderson, and their last wishes were never documented.

In Indiana, at least eighteen Black people were lynched between 1877 and 1950.

== Memorialization ==
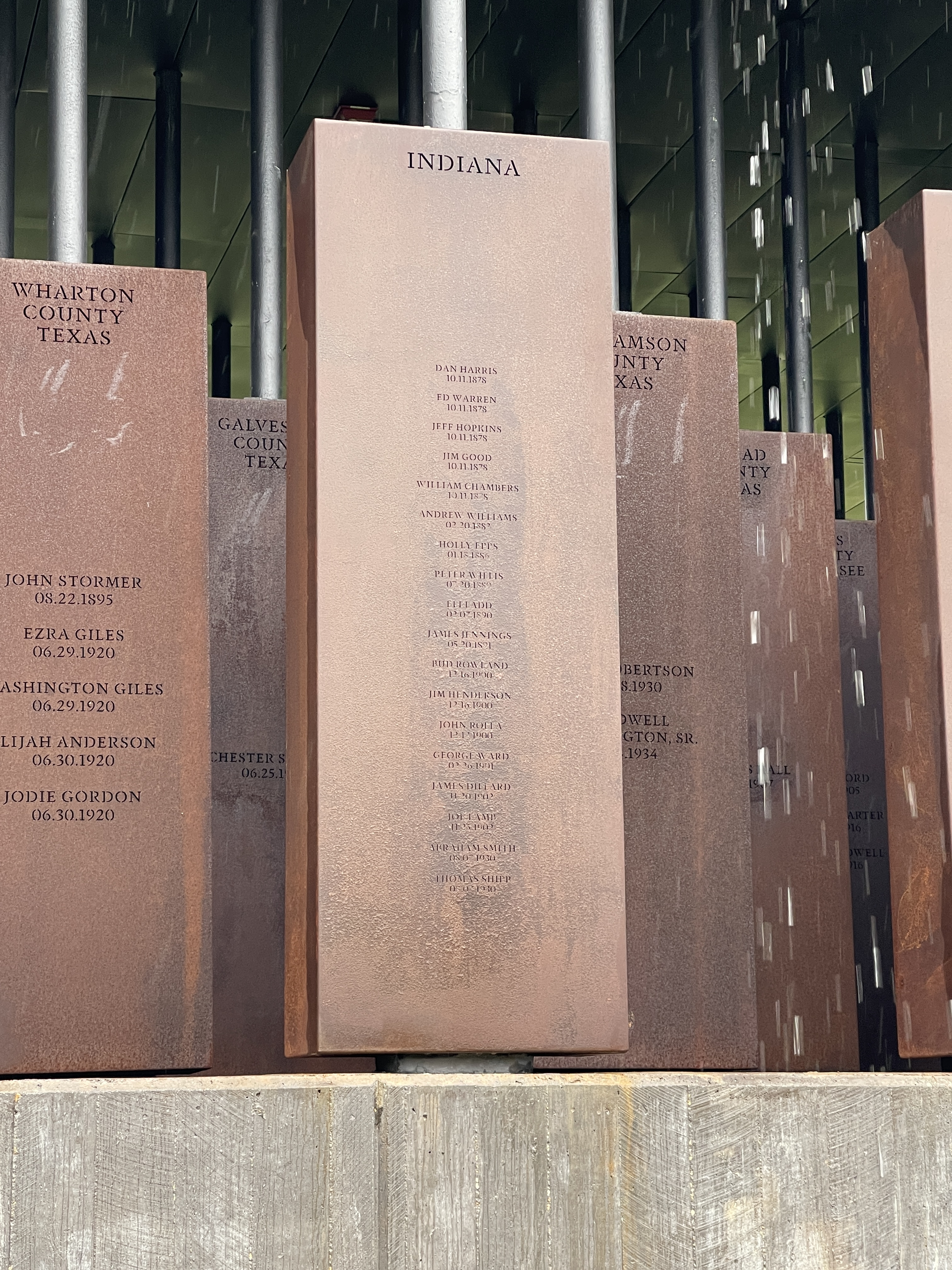
Equal Justice Initiative Marker at the National Memorial for Peace and Justice in Montgomery, Alabama. This marker, for Indiana, commemorates the three victims of this racial terror lynching.

The Equal Justice Initiative (EJI) commemorated the lynching of Bud Rowland, Jim Henderson, and John Rolla in their document, Lynching in America: Confronting the Legacy of Racial Terror. The document reported lynchings that occurred in the Southern states, and states outside of the South where anti-Black violence was prevalent. The EJI also memorialized Rowland, Henderson, and Rolla in the National Memorial for Peace and Justice.
