= Jackson Township, Spencer County, Indiana =

Jackson Township
- Township
- Coordinates: 38°04′30″N 87°02′54″W
- Country: United States
- State: Indiana
- County: Spencer

Government
  - Type: Indiana township

Area
  - Total: 20.49 sq mi (53.1 km^{2})
  - Land: 20.25 sq mi (52.4 km^{2})
  - Water: 0.24 sq mi (0.62 km^{2})
- Elevation: 505 ft (154 m)

Population (2020)
  - Total: 803
  - Density: 39.7/sq mi (15.3/km^{2})
- FIPS code: 18-37422
- GNIS feature ID: 453467

Jackson Township is one of nine townships in Spencer County, Indiana. As of the 2010 census, its population was 803 and it contained 353 housing units. Jackson Township contains the city of Gentryville.

Historical population
Census	Pop.	Note	%±
1890	1,158		—
1900	1,173		1.3%
1910	1,037		−11.6%
1920	770		−25.7%
1930	703		−8.7%
1940	649		−7.7%
1950	632		−2.6%
1960	613		−3.0%
1970	630		2.8%
1980	848		34.6%
1990	824		−2.8%
2000	868		5.3%
2010	891		2.6%
2020	803		−9.9%
Source: US Decennial Census

== History ==
Jackson Township was organized in 1841, and named for Andrew Jackson (1767–1845), the 7th President of the United States.

Colonel William Jones House was listed on the National Register of Historic Places in 1975.

== Geography ==
According to the 2010 census, the township has a total area of 20.49 square miles (53.1 km^{2}), of which 20.25 square miles (52.4 km^{2}) (or 98.83%) is land and 0.24 square miles (0.62 km^{2}) (or 1.17%) is water.

=== Cities and towns ===
- Gentryville
