= Derby, Indiana =

- Unincorporated community
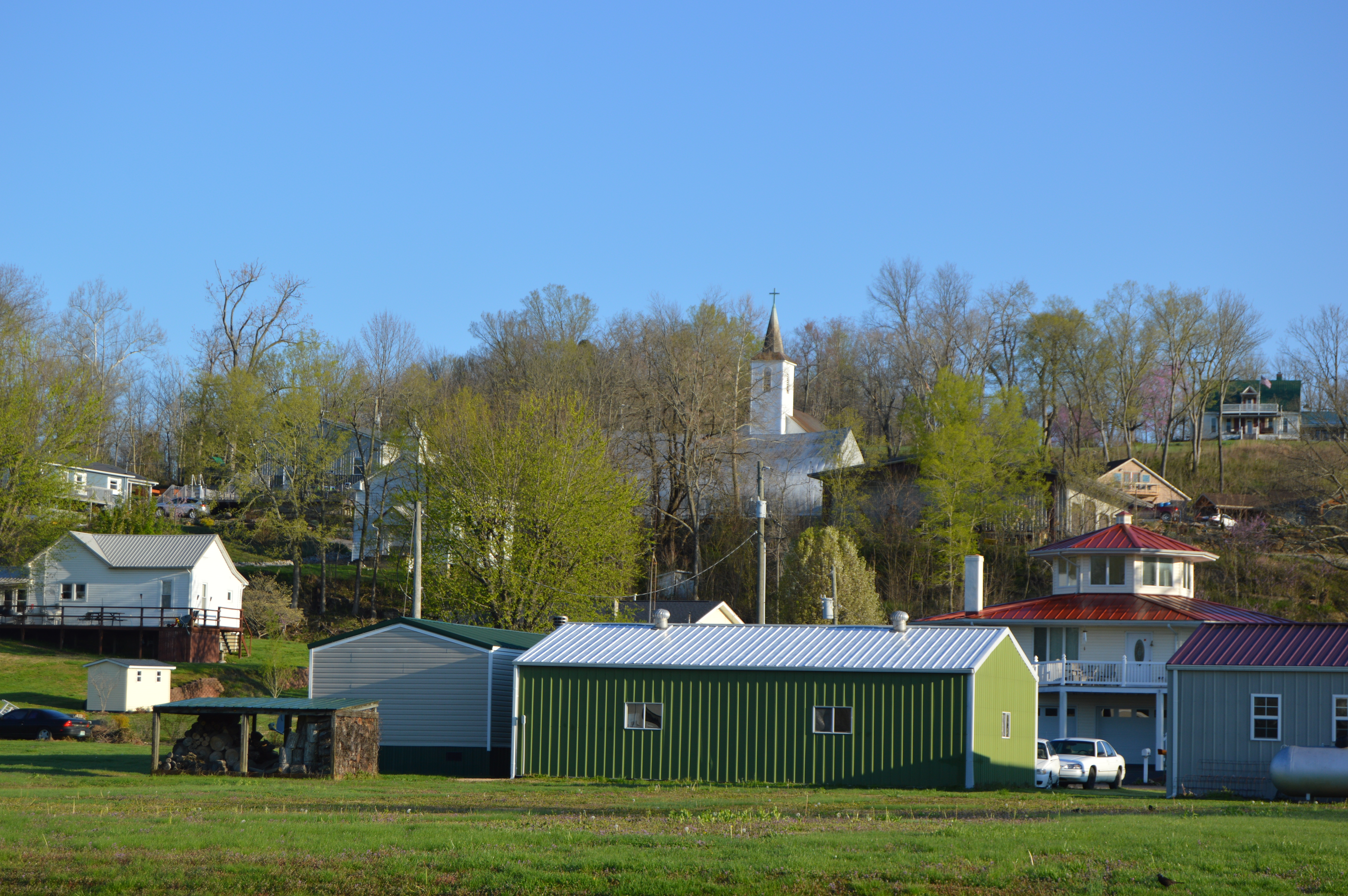
- Overview from Mulzer Park

- Location within Indiana Location within the United States
- Coordinates: 38°1′49″N 86°31′38″W
- Country: United States
- State: Indiana
- County: Perry
- Township: Union
- Elevation: 453 ft (138 m)
- Time zone: UTC-6 (Central (CST))
  - Summer (DST): UTC-5 (CDT)
- ZIP code: 47525
- Area codes: 812, 930
- GNIS feature ID: 450842

Derby is an unincorporated community along the Ohio River in far southern Union Township, Perry County, in the U.S. state of Indiana. It lies at the intersection of State Roads 66 and 70 above the city of Tell City, the county seat of Perry County. It has a post office, with the ZIP code of 47525.

== History ==
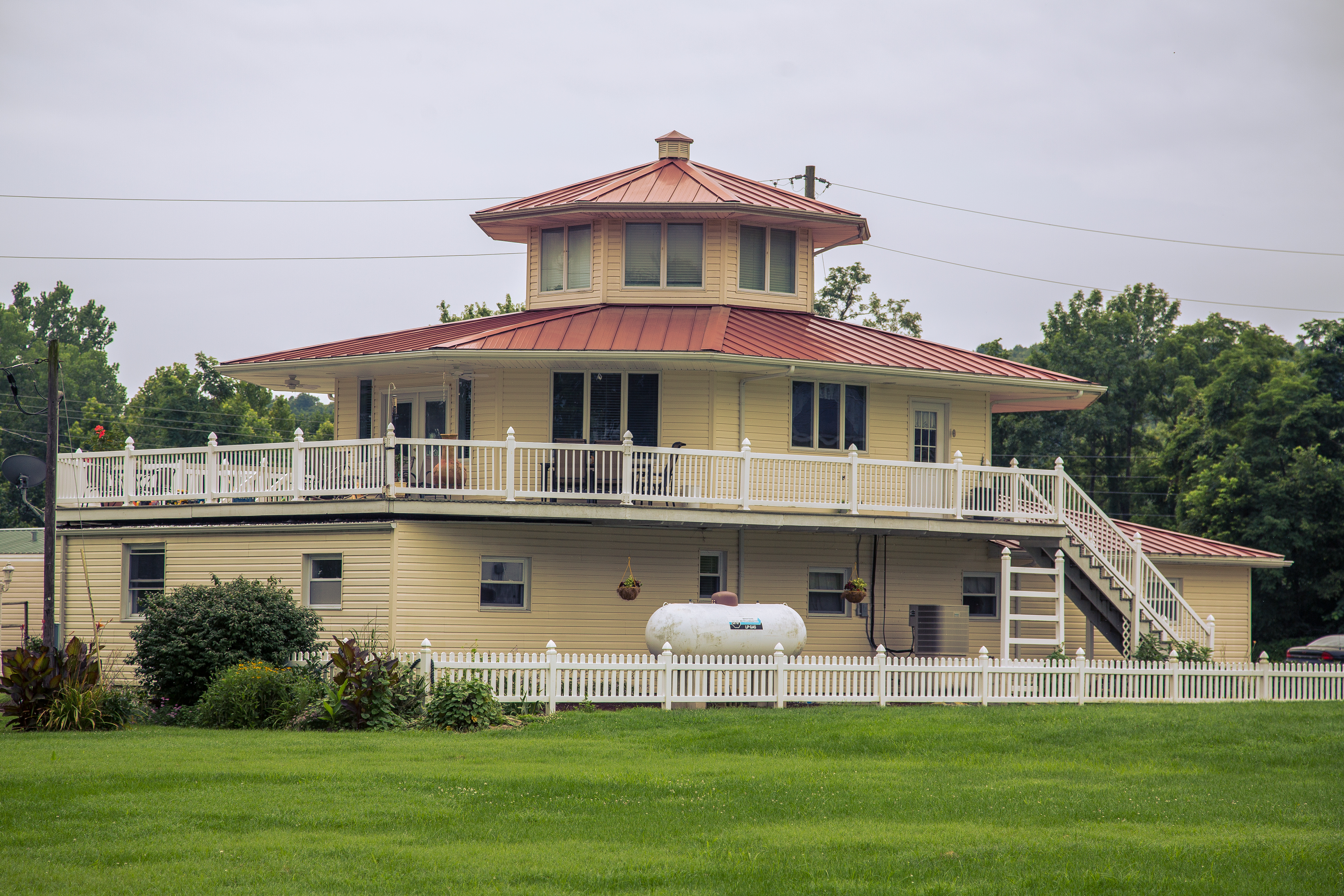
Photo from Small Town Indiana photo survey.

Derby was platted in 1835. The community was named after Derby, in Ireland. A post office has been in operation at Derby since 1852.

== Education ==
Union Township is in Perry Central Community School Corporation.

Previously the community had its own high school. The school colors were black and gold, and the mascot was the warriors. This school consolidated into Perry Central High School.

== See also ==
- List of cities and towns along the Ohio River
