= Lamar, Indiana =

- Unincorporated community
- Location within Indiana Location within the United States
- Coordinates: 38°04′09″N 86°54′20″W
- Country: United States
- State: Indiana
- County: Spencer
- Township: Clay
- Elevation: 413 ft (126 m)
- Time zone: UTC-6 (Central (CST))
  - Summer (DST): UTC-5 (CDT)
- ZIP code: 47550
- Area codes: 812, 930
- FIPS code: 18-41778
- GNIS feature ID: 437569

Lamar is an unincorporated community in Clay Township, Spencer County, in the U.S. state of Indiana.

== History ==
A post office has been in operation at Lamar since 1888.

== Geography ==
Lamar is located at 38°04′09″N 86°54′20″W.
