= Ferdinand State Forest =

State forest in Dubois County, Indiana, U.S.

- Location within Indiana
- Location: Dubois County, Indiana, USA
- Nearest city: Ferdinand, Indiana
- Coordinates: 38°15′32.43″N 86°46′48.99″W
- Area: 7,657 acres (30.99 km^{2})
- Established: 1934
- Governing body: Indiana Department of Natural Resources

Ferdinand State Forest was formed in 1934 in Dubois County, Indiana, USA. Its west edge is approximately 5 miles to the east of the town of Ferdinand; Indiana State Road 264 connects the town with the forest. The forest covers an area of 7,657 acres (30.99 km^{2}).
