= Deutsch Evangelische St. Paul's Kirche =

Historic church in Indiana, United States

- Formerly listed on the U.S. National Register of Historic Places
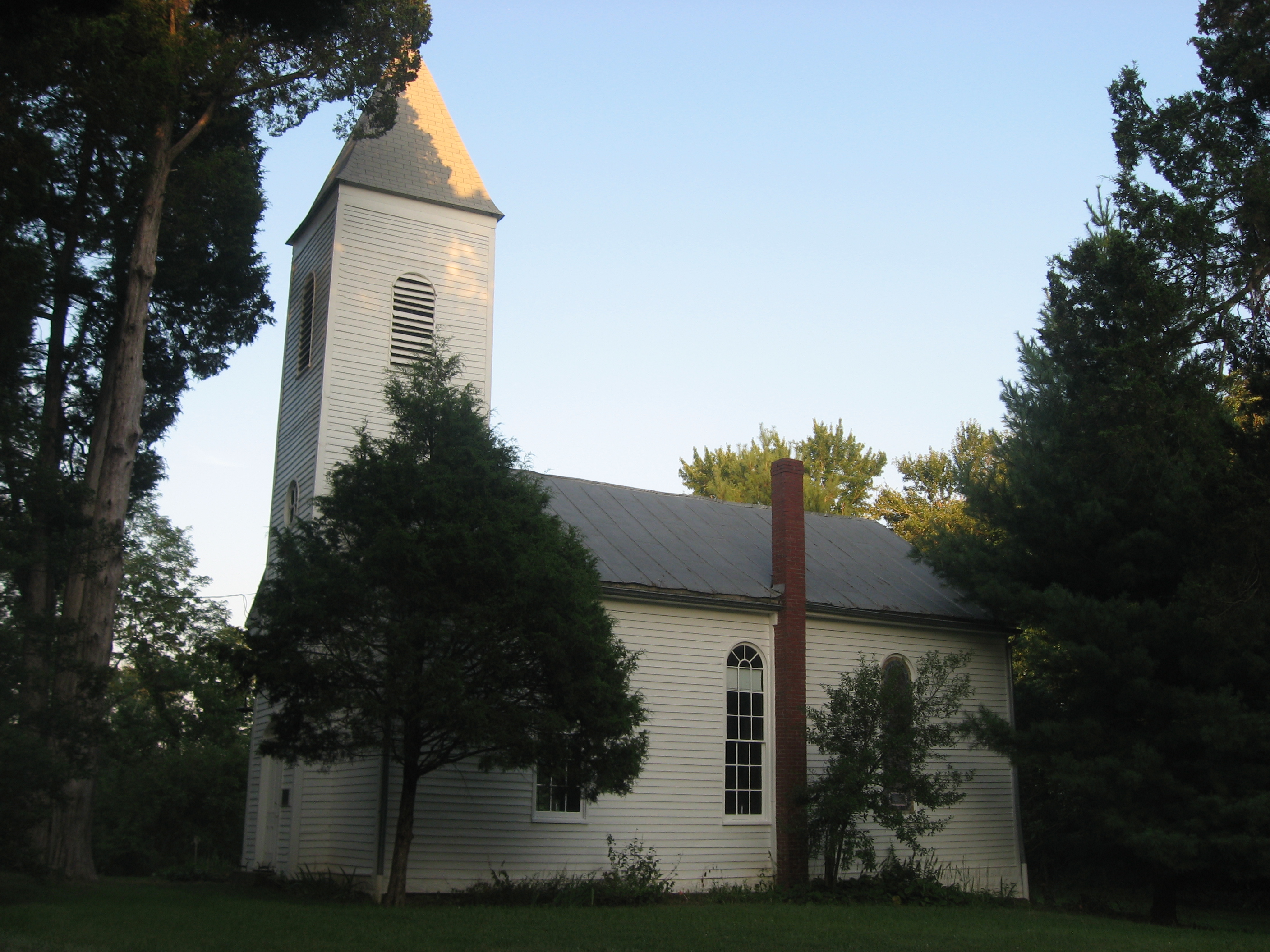
- Deutsch Evangelische St. Paul's Kirche, July 2012

- Location within Indiana Location within the United States
- Location: South of central Santa Claus on Santa Fe Rd., Santa Claus, Indiana
- Coordinates: 38°6′40″N 86°54′33″W
- Area: 1 acre (0.40 ha)
- Built: 1880
- NRHP reference No.: 84001644

Significant dates
- Added to NRHP: September 27, 1984
- Removed from NRHP: November 13, 2012

Deutsch Evangelische St. Paul's Kirche is a historic Evangelical Protestant church located at Santa Claus, Indiana. It was built in 1880, and is a one-story, wood-frame building sheathed in clapboard siding. It sits on a sandstone block foundation and has a gable roof. It features a square bell tower with steeple measuring 70 feet tall. The building was moved to Santa Claus Park in 2012.

It was listed on the National Register of Historic Places in 1984 and delisted in 2012.
