= Kercheval, Indiana =

- Unincorporated community
- Location within Indiana Location within the United States
- Coordinates: 38°05′22″N 87°00′50″W
- Country: United States
- State: Indiana
- County: Spencer
- Township: Clay
- Elevation: 463 ft (141 m)
- Time zone: UTC-6 (Central (CST))
  - Summer (DST): UTC-5 (CDT)
- ZIP code: 47552
- Area codes: 812, 930
- GNIS feature ID: 446753

Kercheval is an unincorporated community in Clay Township, Spencer County, in the U.S. state of Indiana.

== History ==
A post office was established at Kercheval in 1882, and remained in operation until 1904. The community bears the name of the Kercheval family of settlers.

== Geography ==
Kercheval is located at 38°05′22″N 87°00′50″W.
