= Mariah Hill, Indiana =

- Census-designated place
- Location within Indiana Location within the United States
- Coordinates: 38°09′53″N 86°55′41″W
- Country: United States
- State: Indiana
- County: Spencer
- Township: Carter
- Elevation: 525 ft (160 m)
- Time zone: UTC-6 (Central (CST))
  - Summer (DST): UTC-5 (CDT)
- ZIP code: 47523
- Area codes: 812, 930
- FIPS code: 18-46764
- GNIS feature ID: 2830536

Mariah Hill is an unincorporated community and census-designated place in Carter Township, Spencer County, in the U.S. state of Indiana.

== History ==
Mariah Hill was originally called Maria Hilf, and under the latter name was laid out in 1860. The town's original German name was devoted to Maria, Hilfe der Christen (Mary Help of Christians). The name Maria Hilf was altered and anglicized by postal authorities when a post office was established as Mariah Hill in 1862.

== Notable people ==
NFL player Ken Dilger is a past resident of Mariah Hill. He was a Pro Bowl tight end with the Indianapolis Colts and Tampa Bay Buccaneers. Dilger is an alumnus of the University of Illinois and Heritage Hills High School.

Former NFL running back Bruce King is also a native of Mariah Hill. King graduated from Purdue University, where he was a three-year starter for the Boilermakers and started on the 1984 Peach Bowl team. King played for the Kansas City Chiefs and Buffalo Bills.

== Geography ==
=== Climate ===
The climate in this area is characterized by hot, humid summers and generally mild to cool winters. According to the Köppen Climate Classification system, Mariah Hill has a humid subtropical climate, abbreviated "Cfa" on climate maps.

== Demographics ==
The United States Census Bureau defined Mariah Hill as a census designated place in the 2022 American Community Survey.
