= Colonel William Jones House =

Historic house in Indiana, United States

- Col. William Jones House
- U.S. National Register of Historic Places
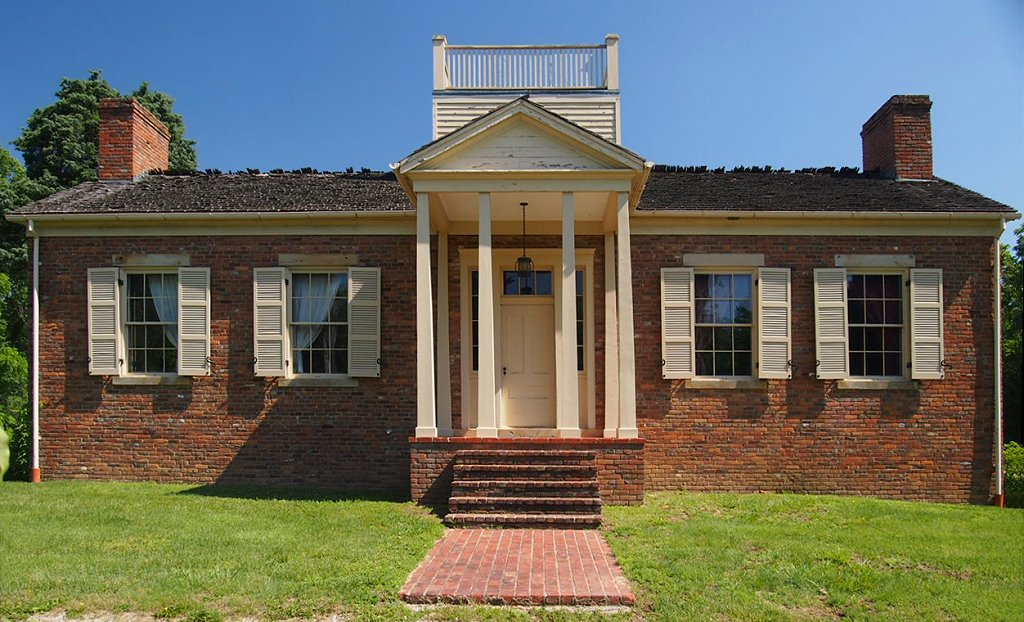
- South facade

- Location within Indiana Location within the United States
- Location: Boone Street, Gentryville, Indiana
- Coordinates: 38°6′50.9″N 87°2′34.7″W
- Area: 5 acres (2.0 ha)
- Built: 1834
- Architectural style: Federal
- NRHP reference No.: 75000050
- Added to NRHP: May 12, 1975

Colonel William Jones House, also known as William Jones State Historic Site, is a historic house in Gentryville and the Lincoln State Park in Jackson Township, Spencer County, Indiana. It was listed on the National Register of Historic Places on May 12, 1975. William Jones (1803–1864) was a farmer, merchant, soldier, and politician.

He lived, farmed and operated a store in the Little Pigeon Creek Community, living in an area that is currently in the town of Gentryville, Indiana. Abraham Lincoln, who lived nearby, worked in the store. During the Civil War, Jones served as a lieutenant colonel and died during the Battle of Atlanta on July 22, 1864, and was made colonel as of that date.

== Biography ==
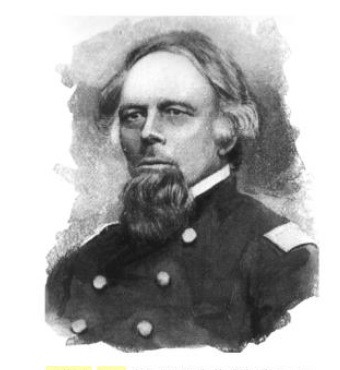
Colonel William Jones, American Civil War (1803–1864)

William Jones, the son of Peter and Sarah Keller Jones, (Note: His parents were married in Jefferson County, Kentucky in 1800. Peter had a political career and made most of his income from Jones Tavern in Vincennes, Indiana. He was involved in the Treaty of Fort Wayne as Indian treaty council secretary. Peter Jones also served in territorial government of William Henry Harrison.) was born on January 5, 1803, in Vincennes, Indiana. William Jones was exposed to important people and events in his childhood and received a good education. He apprenticed for a wholesale dry goods firm in Louisville, Kentucky.

He married Fanny Payne and had two young children that died in their childhood. He left Kentucky and opened a successful store in Jonesboro, Spencer County, Indiana in 1827 and lived in a nearby log cabin. In 1830, he married Rachel Oskins and they had five sons.

Jones sold and bartered merchandise and shipped farmer's grain, tobacco, hides, pork, venison, and beef to New Orleans on flatboats. He also became a postmaster. Jones employed Abraham Lincoln, who lived a few miles from Jones in the Little Pigeon Creek Community, to butcher and process meat and unpack boxes in 1829. Lincoln read all of Jones' books and Jones remarked that "Lincoln would make a great man one of these days."

Jones was elected in 1838 to the Indiana General Assembly, where he supported internal improvements and economic development and served until 1841. Jones was a supporter of Whig Henry Clay and was "incapacitated" for several days when Clay lost the presidential election. Lincoln, who was then an Illinois elector became a Whig, had heard Jones political views and campaigned. Lincoln made speeches for Clay in 1844 and stayed at the Jones House at that time. Jones and Lincoln both became Republicans when the Whig party was terminated.

In the 1850s, Jones moved to Gentryville, Indiana and opened another store. Jones was a Union colonel (Note: He was made lieutenant colonel on February 24, 1862, and Colonel on July 22, 1864.) of the 53rd Regiment of Indiana Volunteers (transferred from the 62nd Indiana Infantry Regiment in 1862) during the Civil War. He received battle honors for his service at Meridian Expedition, Siege of Corinth, and Battle of Atlanta, where he died on July 22, 1864. Jones was wounded in his head and both thighs. His remains were buried at the Marietta National Cemetery in Georgia.

== Jones House ==
Jones built the Colonel William Jones House across the street from his cabin around 1834 when his business endeavors made him wealthy. The one-story, five room, brick house (Note: The Federal style houses are generally two-story.) is a Federal style house with Classical Revival features, including a Greek columned front porch and pediment added about 1887. It has a captain's walk on the roof and a small loft. Lincoln's father, Thomas Lincoln, is said to have built the corner cupboard in the kitchen. It sits on one of the area's highest points.

The Lincoln State Park Improvement Plan of 2005 states that "[t]he Jones Home is an example of the increased affluence and changing economy during this period. The Jones Home represents those successful entrepreneurs who stayed in Southern Indiana instead of moving further west.

Jones moved one half mile east to Gentryville in the early 1850s and the house then went through several owners.In 1887 the house was bought by George and Arietta Bullock and remained in the Bullock family until 1976 when it was purchased by Gayle and Bill Cook who restored the house. It was placed on the National Register of Historic Places in 1975. The house and 100 acres were transferred in 1990 to the Indiana Department of Natural Resources (IDNR).

== Jonesboro ==
About a dozen cabins were built near Jones' house and store and by 1831 the area became known as Jonesboro (not to be confused with the current Jonesboro in Grant County, Indiana). In addition to Jones' house and store and the other dwellings along Corydon Road, the settlement had a school, physician's office, and blacksmith. Jonesboro "was forgotten" after Jones moved his store and post office to Gentryville.
