= Hatfield, Indiana =

- Census-designated place
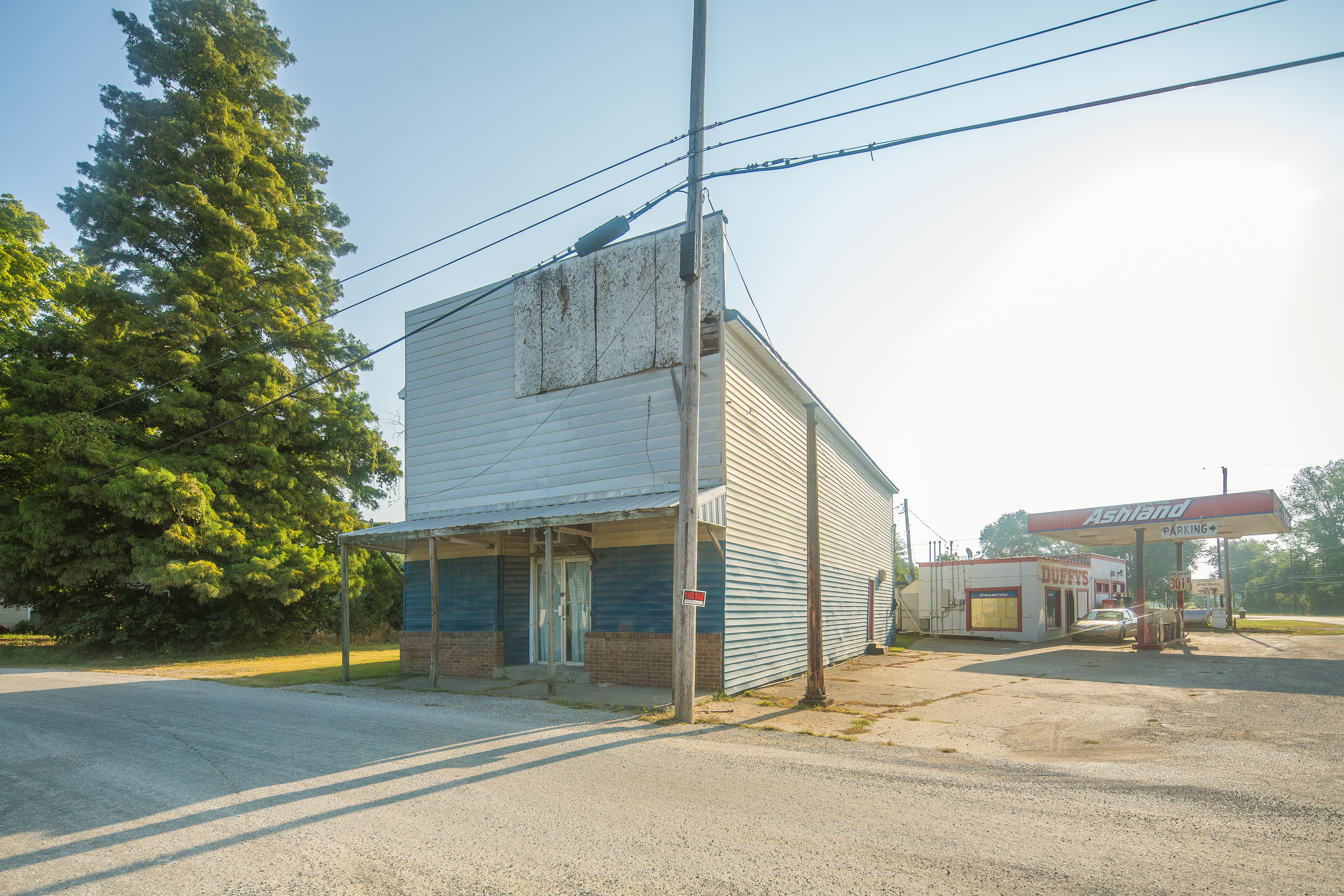

- Location of Hatfield in Spencer County, Indiana.
- Coordinates: 37°54′09″N 87°13′27″W
- Country: United States
- State: Indiana
- County: Spencer
- Township: Luce

Area
  - Total: 1.17 sq mi (3.03 km^{2})
  - Land: 1.17 sq mi (3.03 km^{2})
  - Water: 0 sq mi (0.00 km^{2})
- Elevation: 384 ft (117 m)

Population (2020)
  - Total: 708
  - Density: 604.3/sq mi (233.32/km^{2})
- Time zone: UTC-6 (Central (CST))
  - Summer (DST): UTC-5 (CDT)
- ZIP code: 47617
- Area codes: 812, 930
- FIPS code: 18-32494
- GNIS feature ID: 2629886

Hatfield is an unincorporated census-designated place in Luce Township, Spencer County, in the U.S. state of Indiana. As of the 2020 census, Hatfield had a population of 708.

== History ==
Hatfield was originally called Fair Fight, and under the latter name was laid out in 1883 by James Hatfield. A post office called Hatfield has been in operation since 1886.

== Demographics ==
Historical population
Census	Pop.	Note	%±
2020	708		—
U.S. Decennial Census
