= Spencer County, Indiana =

County in Indiana, United States

- County
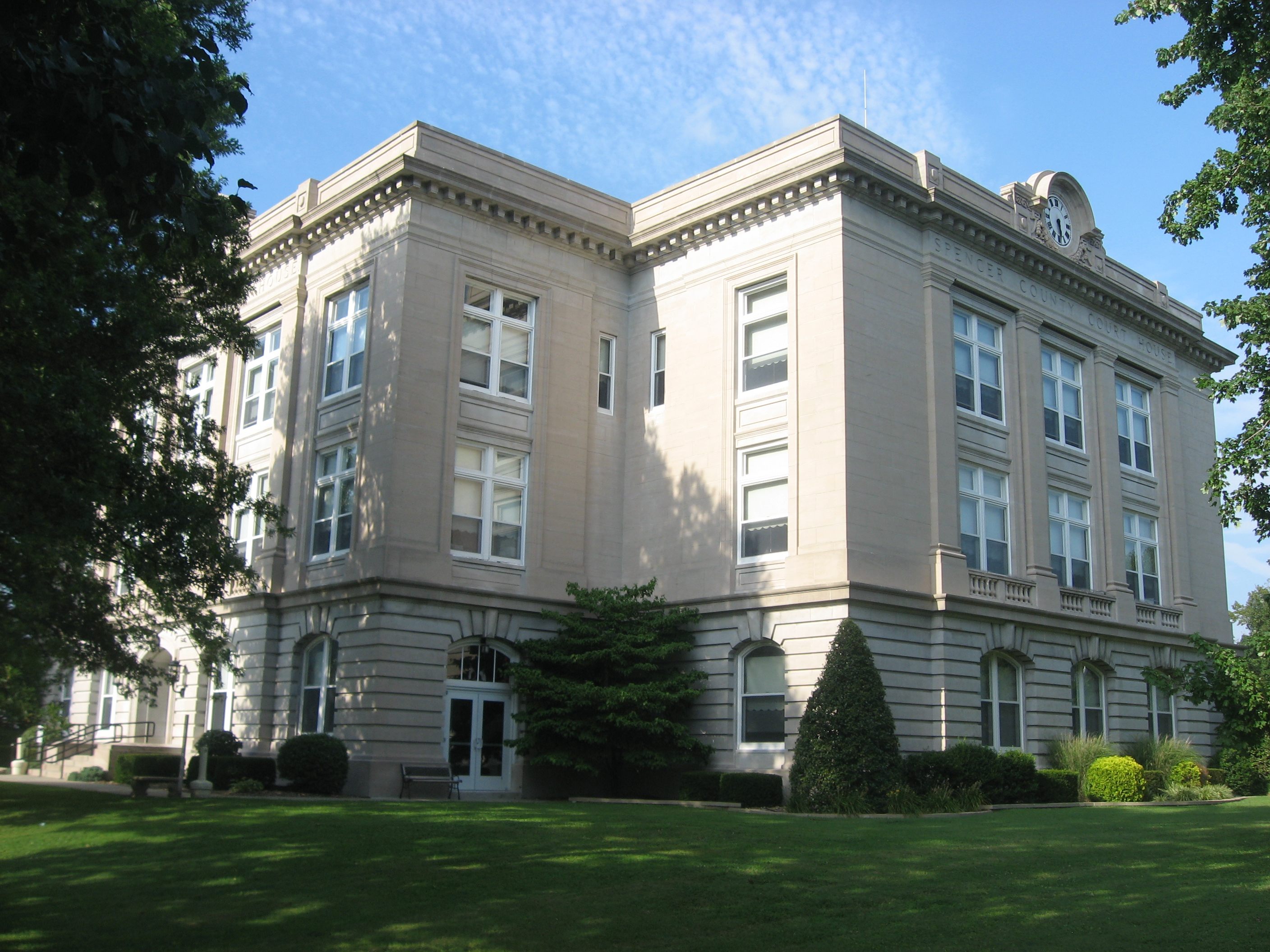
- Spencer County Courthouse in Rockport, Indiana

- Flag

- Location within the U.S. state of Indiana
- Coordinates: 38°01′N 87°01′W
- Country: United States
- State: Indiana
- Founded: January 10, 1818
- Named for: Spier Spencer
- Seat: Rockport
- Largest town: Santa Claus

Area
  - Total: 401.43 sq mi (1,039.7 km^{2})
  - Land: 396.74 sq mi (1,027.6 km^{2})
  - Water: 4.68 sq mi (12.1 km^{2})

Population (2020)
  - Total: 19,810
  - Estimate (2025): 20,061 ▲
  - Density: 49.9/sq mi (19.3/km^{2})
- Time zone: UTC−6 (Central)
  - Summer (DST): UTC−5 (CDT)
- Congressional district: 8th
- Website: www.in.gov/counties/spencer/
- Indiana county number 74

Spencer County is a county located in the U.S. state of Indiana. As of the 2020 census, the population was 19,810. The county seat is Rockport. Despite not being in the Owensboro Metropolitan Area, the entire riverfront of Owensboro, Kentucky, borders the southern tip of the county.

== History ==
Spencer County was formed in 1818 from parts of Warrick County and Perry County. It was named for Captain Spier Spencer, killed at the Battle of Tippecanoe in 1811. He was also the namesake for Spencer, Indiana, the county seat of Owen County.

Abraham Lincoln lived in Spencer County from 1816 to 1830, between the ages of seven and twenty-one. Originally, the area his family settled in was in Perry County with Spencer County being formed almost two years later. His family moved to Illinois in 1830. The Lincoln Boyhood National Memorial is located at the site of the Lincoln family farm. In addition, the graves of his mother Nancy Lincoln and sister Sarah Lincoln Grigsby are located in Spencer County.

On December 16, 1900, two African-American men, Bud Rowland and Jim Henderson, were lynched by the county courthouse in Rockport after being arrested as suspects in the brutal robbery and killing of a white barber at 2 am the night before. A mob estimated at 1,500 broke open the jail and took them out, hanging them from a tree by the courthouse, and shooting their bodies numerous times. John Rolla was accused by Rowlands as a suspect and also lynched. This was the second-highest number of lynchings in the state, though it pales in comparison to lynchings in Southern states.

The current Spencer County courthouse was built in 1921. It is the fifth courthouse to serve the county.

County attractions include the town of Santa Claus, Holiday World & Splashin' Safari, and Santa's Candy Castle.

Saint Meinrad Archabbey is located at the northeastern corner of Spencer County.

== Geography ==
According to the 2010 census, the county has a total area of 401.43 square miles (1,039.7 km^{2}), of which 396.74 square miles (1,027.6 km^{2}) (or 98.83%) is land and 4.68 square miles (12.1 km^{2}) (or 1.17%) is water.

=== Cities and towns ===
ZIP Codes are in parentheses.

- Chrisney (47611)
- Dale (47523)
- Gentryville (47537)
- Grandview (47615)
- Richland (47634)
- Rockport (47635)
- Santa Claus (47579)

=== Census-designated place ===
- Hatfield (47617)
- St. Meinrad (47577)

=== Other unincorporated places ===
- Africa
- Bloomfield
- Buffaloville
- Centerville
- Clay City
- Enterprise
- Eureka
- Evanston (47531)
- Fulda (47531)
- Huffman
- Kercheval
- Lamar (47550)
- Liberal
- Lincoln City (47552)
- Mariah Hill (47556)
- Maxville
- Midway
- New Boston
- Newtonville
- Patronville
- Pyeattville
- Reo
- Rock Hill
- Sand Ridge
- Santa Fe
- Schley
- Silverdale

=== Townships ===
- Carter
- Clay
- Grass
- Hammond
- Harrison
- Huff
- Jackson
- Luce
- Ohio

=== Adjacent counties ===
- Dubois County (north/ET Boundary)
- Daviess County, Kentucky (south)
- Perry County (east)
- Hancock County, Kentucky (southeast)
- Warrick County (west)

=== Major highways ===
- Interstate 64
- U.S. Route 231
- Indiana State Road 62
- Indiana State Road 66
- Indiana State Road 68
- Indiana State Road 70
- Indiana State Road 161
- Indiana State Road 162
- Indiana State Road 245
- Indiana State Road 545

=== National protected area ===
- Lincoln Boyhood National Memorial

== Climate and weather ==
Rockport, Indiana

Climate chart (precipitation, max. and min. temperature)
J	F	M	A	M	J	J	A	S	O	N	D
3.5 43 24	3.9 49 29	4.3 59 37	4.7 70 45	4.8 79 55	3.6 87 64	3.8 91 68	3.5 90 65	3.5 83 58	3 73 46	4.1 59 37	3.9 47 29
- █ Average max. and min. temperatures in °F
- █ Precipitation totals in inches
- Source: The Weather Channel
Metric conversion
J	F	M	A	M	J	J	A	S	O	N	D
88 6 −4	98 9 −2	108 15 3	118 21 7	121 26 13	92 31 18	97 33 20	90 32 18	89 28 14	76 23 8	104 15 3	99 8 −2
- █ Average max. and min. temperatures in °C
- █ Precipitation totals in mm

In recent years, average temperatures in Rockport have ranged from a low of 24 °F (−4 °C) in January to a high of 91 °F (33 °C) in July, although a record low of −23 °F (−31 °C) was recorded in January 1994 and a record high of 107 °F (42 °C) was recorded in June 1944. Average monthly precipitation ranged from 3.01 inches (76 mm) in October to 4.78 inches (121 mm) in May.

== Government ==
The county government is a constitutional body, and is granted specific powers by the Constitution of Indiana, and by the Indiana Code.

County Council: The county council is the legislative branch of the county government and controls all the spending and revenue collection in the county. Representatives are elected from county districts. The council members serve four-year terms. They are responsible for setting salaries, the annual budget, and special spending. The council also has limited authority to impose local taxes, in the form of an income and property tax that is subject to state level approval, excise taxes, and service taxes.

Board of Commissioners: The executive body of the county is made of a board of commissioners. The commissioners are elected county-wide, in staggered terms, and each serves a four-year term. One of the commissioners, typically the most senior, serves as president. The commissioners are charged with executing the acts legislated by the council, collecting revenue, and managing the day-to-day functions of the county government.

Court: The county maintains a small claims court that can handle some civil cases. The judge on the court is elected to a term of four years and must be a member of the Indiana Bar Association. The judge is assisted by a constable who is also elected to a four-year term. In some cases, court decisions can be appealed to the state level circuit court.

County Officials: The county has several other elected offices, including sheriff, coroner, auditor, treasurer, recorder, surveyor, and circuit court clerk. Each of these elected officers serves a term of four years and oversees a different part of county government. Members elected to county government positions are required to declare party affiliations and to be residents of the county.

Spencer County is part of Indiana's 8th congressional district and is represented in Congress by Republican Mark Messmer.

United States presidential election results for Spencer County, Indiana
Year	Republican		Democratic		Third party(ies)	
Year	No.	%	No.	%	No.	%
1888	2,733	50.22%	2,685	49.34%	24	0.44%
1892	2,478	47.96%	2,496	48.31%	193	3.74%
1896	3,047	52.34%	2,745	47.15%	30	0.52%
1900	2,979	50.55%	2,816	47.79%	98	1.66%
1904	3,017	53.57%	2,495	44.30%	120	2.13%
1908	2,920	51.54%	2,662	46.98%	84	1.48%
1912	1,268	24.80%	2,428	47.50%	1,416	27.70%
1916	2,560	50.34%	2,335	45.92%	190	3.74%
1920	5,270	57.03%	3,855	41.72%	115	1.24%
1924	4,395	48.59%	4,409	48.75%	241	2.66%
1928	4,672	52.83%	4,152	46.95%	20	0.23%
1932	4,014	42.24%	5,422	57.06%	67	0.71%
1936	4,567	47.20%	4,966	51.32%	143	1.48%
1940	5,667	57.31%	4,180	42.27%	42	0.42%
1944	4,986	57.40%	3,647	41.99%	53	0.61%
1948	4,496	51.52%	4,163	47.71%	67	0.77%
1952	5,497	61.48%	3,401	38.04%	43	0.48%
1956	5,404	60.31%	3,530	39.40%	26	0.29%
1960	5,050	53.88%	4,303	45.91%	20	0.21%
1964	3,980	45.05%	4,834	54.72%	20	0.23%
1968	4,603	51.18%	3,767	41.89%	623	6.93%
1972	5,518	58.61%	3,867	41.07%	30	0.32%
1976	4,166	46.34%	4,796	53.35%	28	0.31%
1980	5,284	54.45%	4,153	42.79%	268	2.76%
1984	5,816	59.07%	4,005	40.68%	25	0.25%
1988	4,964	54.82%	4,061	44.85%	30	0.33%
1992	3,789	39.56%	4,301	44.90%	1,489	15.54%
1996	3,770	43.74%	4,058	47.08%	792	9.19%
2000	5,096	56.70%	3,752	41.75%	139	1.55%
2004	5,934	59.79%	3,920	39.50%	70	0.71%
2008	5,001	49.05%	5,039	49.42%	156	1.53%
2012	5,515	56.60%	4,026	41.32%	203	2.08%
2016	6,572	65.41%	2,861	28.47%	615	6.12%
2020	7,357	68.19%	3,213	29.78%	219	2.03%
2024	7,364	70.52%	2,853	27.32%	225	2.15%

== Demographics ==
Historical population
Census	Pop.	Note	%±
1820	1,882		—
1830	3,196		69.8%
1840	6,305		97.3%
1850	8,616		36.7%
1860	14,556		68.9%
1870	17,998		23.6%
1880	22,122		22.9%
1890	22,060		−0.3%
1900	22,407		1.6%
1910	20,676		−7.7%
1920	18,400		−11.0%
1930	16,713		−9.2%
1940	16,211		−3.0%
1950	16,174		−0.2%
1960	16,074		−0.6%
1970	17,134		6.6%
1980	19,361		13.0%
1990	19,490		0.7%
2000	20,391		4.6%
2010	20,952		2.8%
2020	19,810		−5.5%
2025 (est.)	20,061	▲	1.3%
U.S. Decennial Census; 1790-1960 1900-1990; 1990-2000 2010

=== Racial and ethnic composition ===
Spencer County, Indiana – Racial and ethnic composition Note: the US Census treats Hispanic/Latino as an ethnic category. This table excludes Latinos from the racial categories and assigns them to a separate category. Hispanics/Latinos may be of any race.
Race / Ethnicity (NH = Non-Hispanic)	Pop 1980	Pop 1990	Pop 2000	Pop 2010	Pop 2020	% 1980	% 1990	% 2000	% 2010	% 2020
White alone (NH)	19,101	19,221	19,793	20,101	18,368	98.66%	98.62%	97.07%	95.94%	92.72%
Black or African American alone (NH)	118	111	110	96	129	0.61%	0.57%	0.54%	0.46%	0.65%
Native American or Alaska Native alone (NH)	24	35	44	38	44	0.12%	0.18%	0.22%	0.18%	0.22%
Asian alone (NH)	31	33	39	69	73	0.16%	0.17%	0.19%	0.33%	0.37%
Native Hawaiian or Pacific Islander alone (NH)	x	x	1	0	1	x	x	0.00%	0.00%	0.01%
Other race alone (NH)	6	1	10	10	28	0.03%	0.01%	0.05%	0.05%	0.14%
Mixed race or Multiracial (NH)	x	x	91	121	491	x	x	0.45%	0.58%	2.48%
Hispanic or Latino (any race)	81	89	303	517	676	0.42%	0.46%	1.49%	2.47%	3.41%
Total	19,361	19,490	20,391	20,952	19,810	100.00%	100.00%	100.00%	100.00%	100.00%

=== 2020 census ===
As of the 2020 census, the county had a population of 19,810. The median age was 43.9 years. 22.0% of residents were under the age of 18 and 20.0% of residents were 65 years of age or older. For every 100 females there were 102.8 males, and for every 100 females age 18 and over there were 102.6 males age 18 and over.

The racial makeup of the county was 93.7% White, 0.7% Black or African American, 0.3% American Indian and Alaska Native, 0.4% Asian, <0.1% Native Hawaiian and Pacific Islander, 1.5% from some other race, and 3.5% from two or more races. Hispanic or Latino residents of any race comprised 3.4% of the population.

<0.1% of residents lived in urban areas, while 100.0% lived in rural areas.

There were 7,882 households in the county, of which 29.1% had children under the age of 18 living in them. Of all households, 57.3% were married-couple households, 16.9% were households with a male householder and no spouse or partner present, and 19.9% were households with a female householder and no spouse or partner present. About 24.9% of all households were made up of individuals and 12.2% had someone living alone who was 65 years of age or older.

There were 8,572 housing units, of which 8.0% were vacant. Among occupied housing units, 83.5% were owner-occupied and 16.5% were renter-occupied. The homeowner vacancy rate was 1.6% and the rental vacancy rate was 8.4%.

=== 2010 census ===
As of the 2010 United States census, there were 20,952 people, 8,082 households, and 5,907 families residing in the county. The population density was 52.8 inhabitants per square mile (20.4/km^{2}). There were 8,872 housing units at an average density of 22.4 per square mile (8.6/km^{2}). The racial makeup of the county was 96.9% White, 0.5% Black or African American, 0.3% Asian, 0.2% American Indian, 1.3% from other races, and 0.8% from two or more races. Those of Hispanic or Latino origin made up 2.5% of the population. In terms of ancestry, 47.0% were German, 16.4% were Irish, 12.6% were English, and 11.1% were American.

Of the 8,082 households, 33.5% had children under the age of 18 living with them, 60.8% were married couples living together, 8.1% had a female householder with no husband present, 26.9% were non-families, and 23.2% of all households were made up of individuals. The average household size was 2.55 and the average family size was 3.00. The median age was 41.9 years.

The median income for a household in the county was $47,697 and the median income for a family was $61,365. Males had a median income of $44,526 versus $30,466 for females. The per capita income for the county was $23,609. About 6.8% of families and 12.1% of the population were below the poverty line, including 18.0% of those under age 18 and 12.8% of those age 65 or over.

== Education ==
It has two school districts, North Spencer County School Corporation and South Spencer County School Corporation.

== Notable people ==
- H. Justin Davidson, sixth dean, Samuel Curtis Johnson Graduate School of Management at Cornell University
- Ken Dilger, former professional football player, Indianapolis Colts and Tampa Bay Buccaneers
- Del Harris, Member, Naismith Basketball Hall of Fame; vice president, Texas Legends professional basketball team
- Florence Henderson, former singer and actress
- Roger Kaiser, former professional basketball player and coach
- Bill Peet, former children's author
- Thomas Gamble Pitcher, former Superintendent of the United States Military Academy
- Howard Schnellenberger, former professional and collegiate football coach, head coach, 1983 Miami Hurricanes national championship team
- Abraham Lincoln, 16th President of the United States

== See also ==
- List of public art in Spencer County, Indiana
- National Register of Historic Places listings in Spencer County, Indiana
