= Grandview, Indiana =

- Town
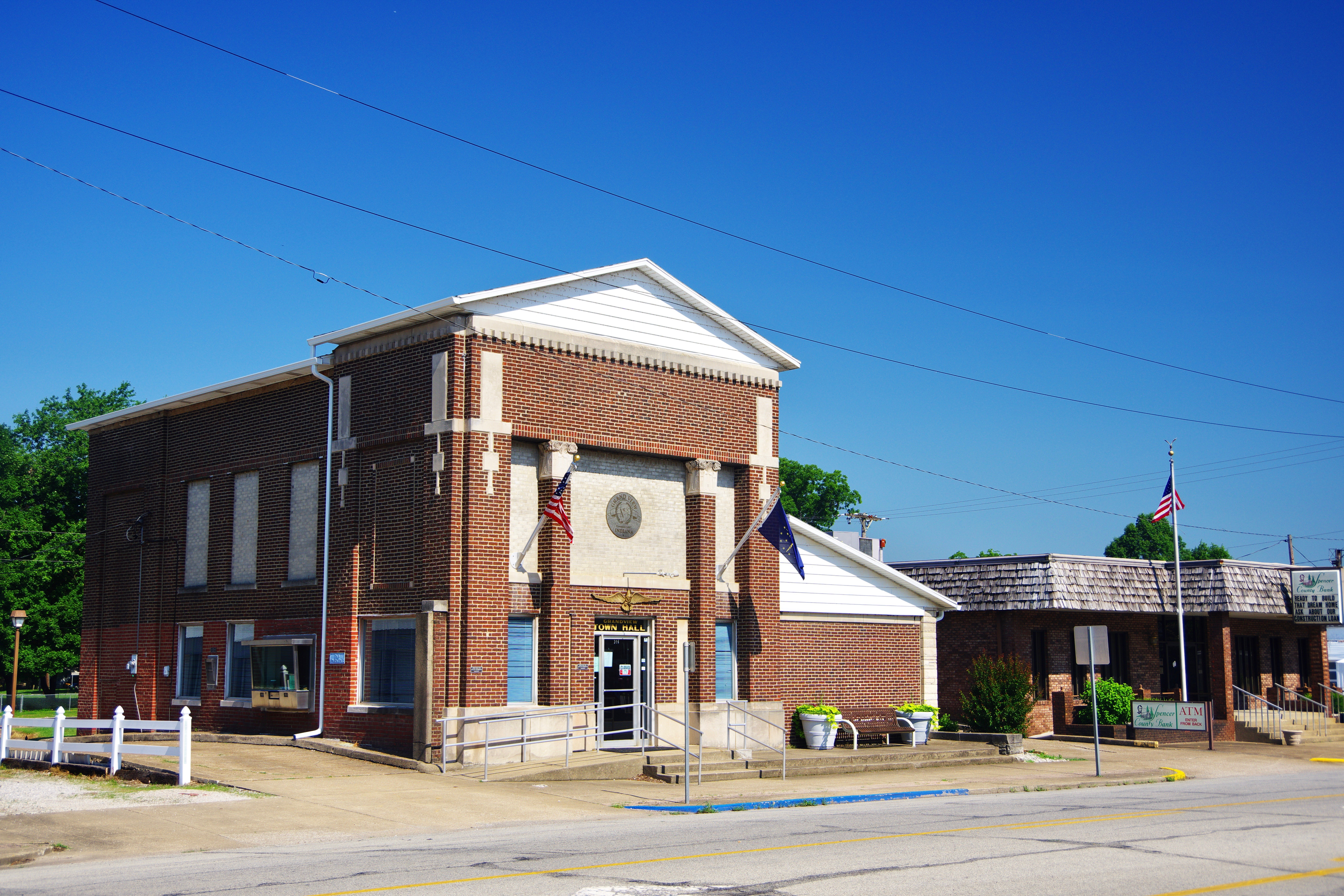
- Grandview Town Hall

- Location of Grandview in Spencer County, Indiana.
- Coordinates: 37°56′13″N 86°59′03″W
- Country: United States
- State: Indiana
- County: Spencer
- Township: Hammond

Area
  - Total: 0.96 sq mi (2.49 km^{2})
  - Land: 0.96 sq mi (2.48 km^{2})
  - Water: 0 sq mi (0.00 km^{2})
- Elevation: 387 ft (118 m)

Population (2020)
  - Total: 698
  - Density: 727.9/sq mi (281.04/km^{2})
- Time zone: UTC-6 (CST)
  - Summer (DST): UTC-5 (CDT)
- ZIP code: 47615
- Area code: 812
- FIPS code: 18-28692
- GNIS feature ID: 2396970
- Website: www.townofgrandview-in.com

Grandview is a town in Hammond Township, Spencer County, Indiana, along the Ohio River. The population was 698 at the 2020 census.

== History ==
Grandview was laid out in 1851. The town received its name because of the "grand view" of the Ohio River. A post office has been in operation at Grandview since 1854.

== Geography ==
Grandview is situated along the Ohio River at river mile 742, just upstream from Rockport, Indiana, and downstream from Lewisport, Kentucky. The Rockport Generating Station lies just west of Grandview. Indiana State Road 66 connects Grandview with Rockport to the southwest and the Tell City area to the northeast.

According to the 2010 census, Grandview has a total area of 0.96 square miles (2.49 km^{2}), all land.

== Demographics ==
Historical population
Census	Pop.	Note	%±
1880	686		—
1890	694		1.2%
1900	822		18.4%
1910	735		−10.6%
1920	689		−6.3%
1930	588		−14.7%
1940	607		3.2%
1950	664		9.4%
1960	599		−9.8%
1970	696		16.2%
1980	670		−3.7%
1990	761		13.6%
2000	696		−8.5%
2010	749		7.6%
2020	698		−6.8%
U.S. Decennial Census

=== 2010 census ===
As of the census of 2010, there were 749 people, 288 households, and 199 families living in the town. The population density was 780.2 inhabitants per square mile (301.2/km^{2}). There were 314 housing units at an average density of 327.1 per square mile (126.3/km^{2}). The racial makeup of the town was 96.1% White, 1.5% African American, 0.3% Native American, 0.1% from other races, and 2.0% from two or more races. Hispanic or Latino of any race were 1.1% of the population.

There were 288 households, of which 36.1% had children under the age of 18 living with them, 50.7% were married couples living together, 13.2% had a female householder with no husband present, 5.2% had a male householder with no wife present, and 30.9% were non-families. 26.0% of all households were made up of individuals, and 10.1% had someone living alone who was 65 years of age or older. The average household size was 2.60 and the average family size was 3.14.

The median age in the town was 37.3 years. 27.9% of residents were under the age of 18; 7% were between the ages of 18 and 24; 25.1% were from 25 to 44; 27.5% were from 45 to 64; and 12.3% were 65 years of age or older. The gender makeup of the town was 45.8% male and 54.2% female.

=== 2000 census ===
As of the census of 2000, there were 696 people, 266 households, and 194 families living in the town. The population density was 727.5 inhabitants per square mile (280.9/km^{2}). There were 296 housing units at an average density of 309.4 per square mile (119.5/km^{2}). The racial makeup of the town was 96.84% White, 1.87% African American, 0.43% Native American, 0.43% Asian, and 0.43% from two or more races. Hispanic or Latino of any race were 0.14% of the population.

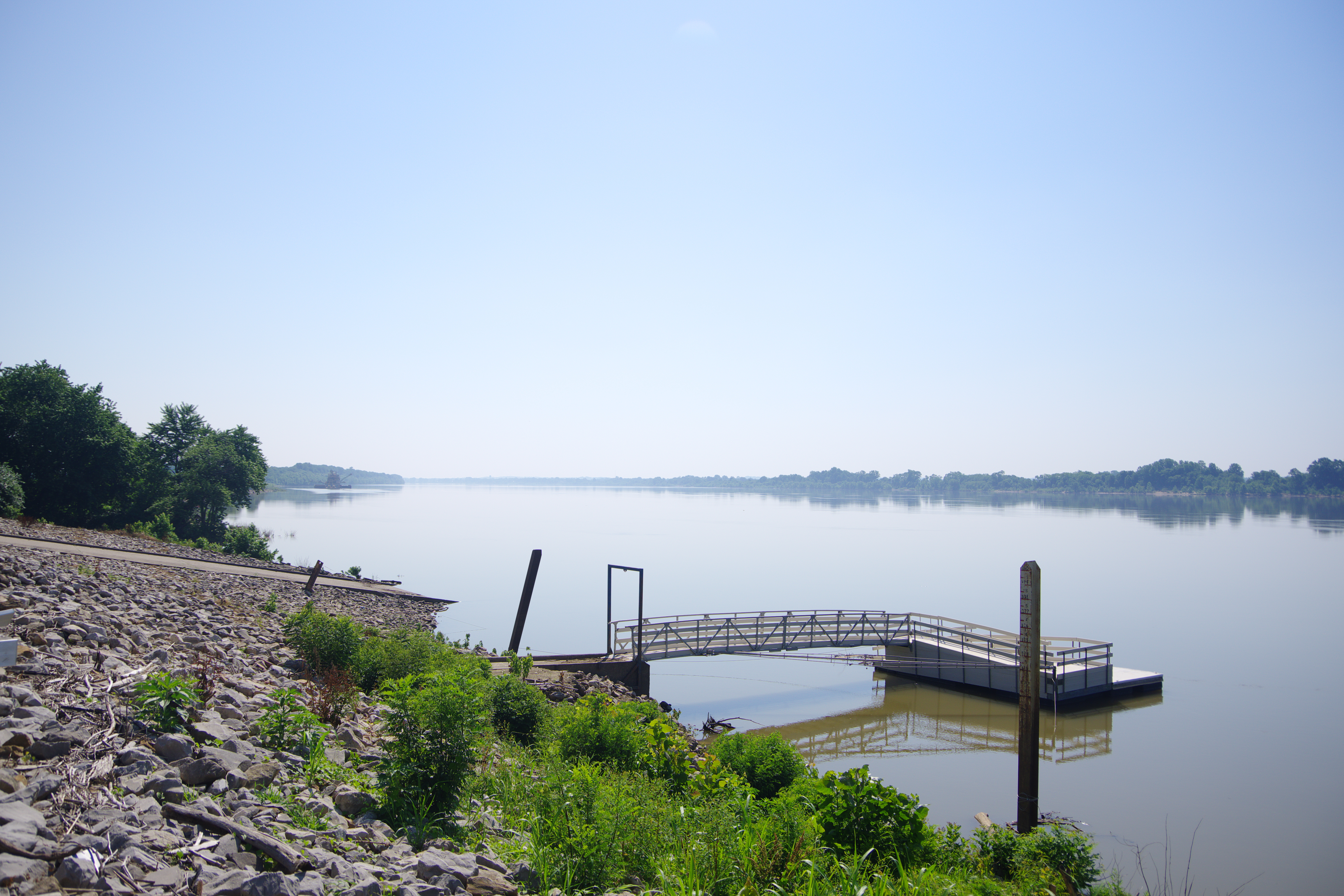
The Ohio River at Grandview

There were 266 households, out of which 36.5% had children under the age of 18 living with them, 57.9% were married couples living together, 12.0% had a female householder with no husband present, and 26.7% were non-families. 22.6% of all households were made up of individuals, and 10.2% had someone living alone who was 65 years of age or older. The average household size was 2.62 and the average family size was 3.08.

In the town, the population was spread out, with 27.4% under the age of 18, 9.1% from 18 to 24, 30.2% from 25 to 44, 22.0% from 45 to 64, and 11.4% who were 65 years of age or older. The median age was 35 years. For every 100 females, there were 100.0 males. For every 100 females age 18 and over, there were 89.1 males.

The median income for a household in the town was $35,417, and the median income for a family was $42,727. Males had a median income of $29,732 versus $20,500 for females. The per capita income for the town was $13,928. About 9.4% of families and 12.0% of the population were below the poverty line, including 20.0% of those under age 18 and 1.8% of those age 65 or over.

== Education ==
It is in the South Spencer County School Corporation.

Prior to 1943, the community had its own high school. The school colors were gold and purple, and the mascots were the greyhounds and the yellowjackets. That year, the students were consolidated into Luce Township High School. That school, in turn, merged into South Spencer High School in 1965.

Grandview has a public library, a branch of Spencer County Public Library.

== Notable people ==
- Bill Peet - American children's book illustrator and a story writer for Disney Studios.

== See also ==
- List of cities and towns along the Ohio River
