= Chrisney, Indiana =

- Town
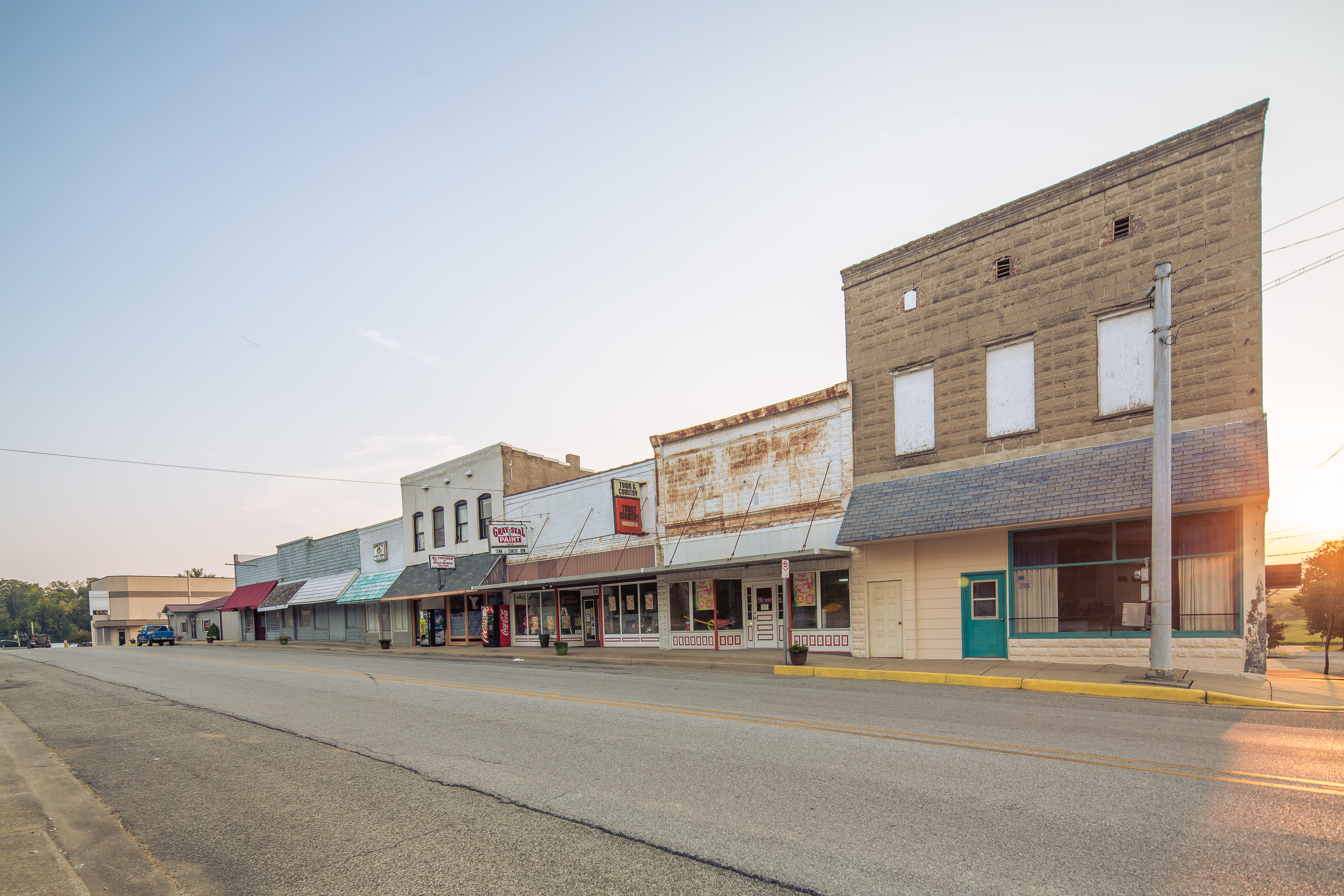

- Location of Chrisney in Spencer County, Indiana.
- Coordinates: 38°00′35″N 87°01′54″W
- Country: United States
- State: Indiana
- County: Spencer
- Township: Grass

Area
  - Total: 0.73 sq mi (1.90 km^{2})
  - Land: 0.71 sq mi (1.83 km^{2})
  - Water: 0.027 sq mi (0.07 km^{2})
- Elevation: 472 ft (144 m)

Population (2020)
  - Total: 465
  - Density: 658.7/sq mi (254.33/km^{2})
- Time zone: UTC-6 (CST)
  - Summer (DST): UTC-5 (CDT)
- ZIP code: 47611
- Area code: 812
- FIPS code: 18-12574
- GNIS feature ID: 2396644
- Website: Official website

Chrisney is a town in Grass Township, Spencer County, in the U.S. state of Indiana. The population was 465 at the 2020 census.

== History ==
Chrisney was originally called Spring Station, and under the latter name was founded in about 1871 when the railroad was extended to that point. A post office was established under the name Spring Station in 1874; in 1883 the post office was renamed Chrisney.

Chrisney High School was in existence from 1908 to 1972. It was closed in 1972, merging with Dale High School to form Heritage Hills High School.

== Geography ==
According to the 2010 census, Chrisney has a total area of 0.74 square miles (1.92 km^{2}), of which 0.71 square miles (1.84 km^{2}) (or 95.95%) is land and 0.03 square miles (0.08 km^{2}) (or 4.05%) is water.

== Demographics ==
Historical population
Census	Pop.	Note	%±
1900	513		—
1910	524		2.1%
1920	495		−5.5%
1930	414		−16.4%
1940	437		5.6%
1950	439		0.5%
1960	380		−13.4%
1970	550		44.7%
1980	537		−2.4%
1990	511		−4.8%
2000	544		6.5%
2010	481		−11.6%
2020	465		−3.3%
U.S. Decennial Census

=== 2010 census ===
As of the census of 2010, there were 481 people, 200 households, and 130 families living in the town. The population density was 677.5 inhabitants per square mile (261.6/km^{2}). There were 234 housing units at an average density of 329.6 per square mile (127.3/km^{2}). The racial makeup of the town was 98.3% White, 0.4% Asian, and 1.2% from other races. Hispanic or Latino of any race were 0.6% of the population.

There were 200 households, of which 31.0% had children under the age of 18 living with them, 51.0% were married couples living together, 9.0% had a female householder with no husband present, 5.0% had a male householder with no wife present, and 35.0% were non-families. 30.0% of all households were made up of individuals, and 17.5% had someone living alone who was 65 years of age or older. The average household size was 2.41 and the average family size was 2.99.

The median age in the town was 41.4 years. 22.9% of residents were under the age of 18; 7.1% were between the ages of 18 and 24; 24.7% were from 25 to 44; 29.3% were from 45 to 64; and 16.2% were 65 years of age or older. The gender makeup of the town was 47.2% male and 52.8% female.

=== 2000 census ===
As of the census of 2000, there were 544 people, 210 households, and 140 families living in the town. The population density was 1,484.9 inhabitants per square mile (573.3/km^{2}). There were 233 housing units at an average density of 636.0 per square mile (245.6/km^{2}). The racial makeup of the town was 97.79% White, 0.74% Native American, 0.37% from other races, and 1.10% from two or more races. Hispanic or Latino of any race were 0.55% of the population.

There were 210 households, out of which 34.3% had children under the age of 18 living with them, 54.3% were married couples living together, 7.1% had a female householder with no husband present, and 33.3% were non-families. 30.5% of all households were made up of individuals, and 14.8% had someone living alone who was 65 years of age or older. The average household size was 2.59 and the average family size was 3.25.

In the town, the population was spread out, with 29.0% under the age of 18, 7.7% from 18 to 24, 27.8% from 25 to 44, 19.3% from 45 to 64, and 16.2% who were 65 years of age or older. The median age was 34 years. For every 100 females, there were 84.4 males. For every 100 females age 18 and over, there were 82.9 males.

The median income for a household in the town was $34,464, and the median income for a family was $45,000. Males had a median income of $30,000 versus $19,125 for females. The per capita income for the town was $14,127. About 14.1% of families and 15.1% of the population were below the poverty line, including 25.6% of those under age 18 and 7.8% of those age 65 or over.

== Education ==
It is in the North Spencer County School Corporation. The community has a public elementary school, Chrisney Elementary School. It ranges from grade Pre-K to 6th grade.

Prior to 1972, the community had its own high school. The mascot was the wildcats, and the school colors were black and orange. In 1972 the school merged into Heritage Hills High School.

Chrisney has a public library, a branch of the Lincoln Heritage Public Library.
