= Newtonville, Indiana =

- Census-designated place
- Location within Indiana Location within the United States
- Coordinates: 38°00′02″N 86°56′30″W
- Country: United States
- State: Indiana
- County: Spencer
- Township: Hammond
- Elevation: 456 ft (139 m)
- Time zone: UTC-6 (Central (CST))
  - Summer (DST): UTC-5 (CDT)
- ZIP code: 47615
- Area codes: 812, 930
- FIPS code: 18-53676
- GNIS feature ID: 2830537

Newtonville is an unincorporated community and census-designated place in Hammond Township, Spencer County, in the U.S. state of Indiana.

== History ==
Newtonville was platted in 1865 by Bezaleel Newton and others.

A post office was established at Newtonville in 1860, and remained in operation until it was discontinued in 1984.

== Demographics ==
The United States Census Bureau defined Newtonville as a census designated place in the 2022 American Community Survey.
