= Dale, Indiana =

- Town
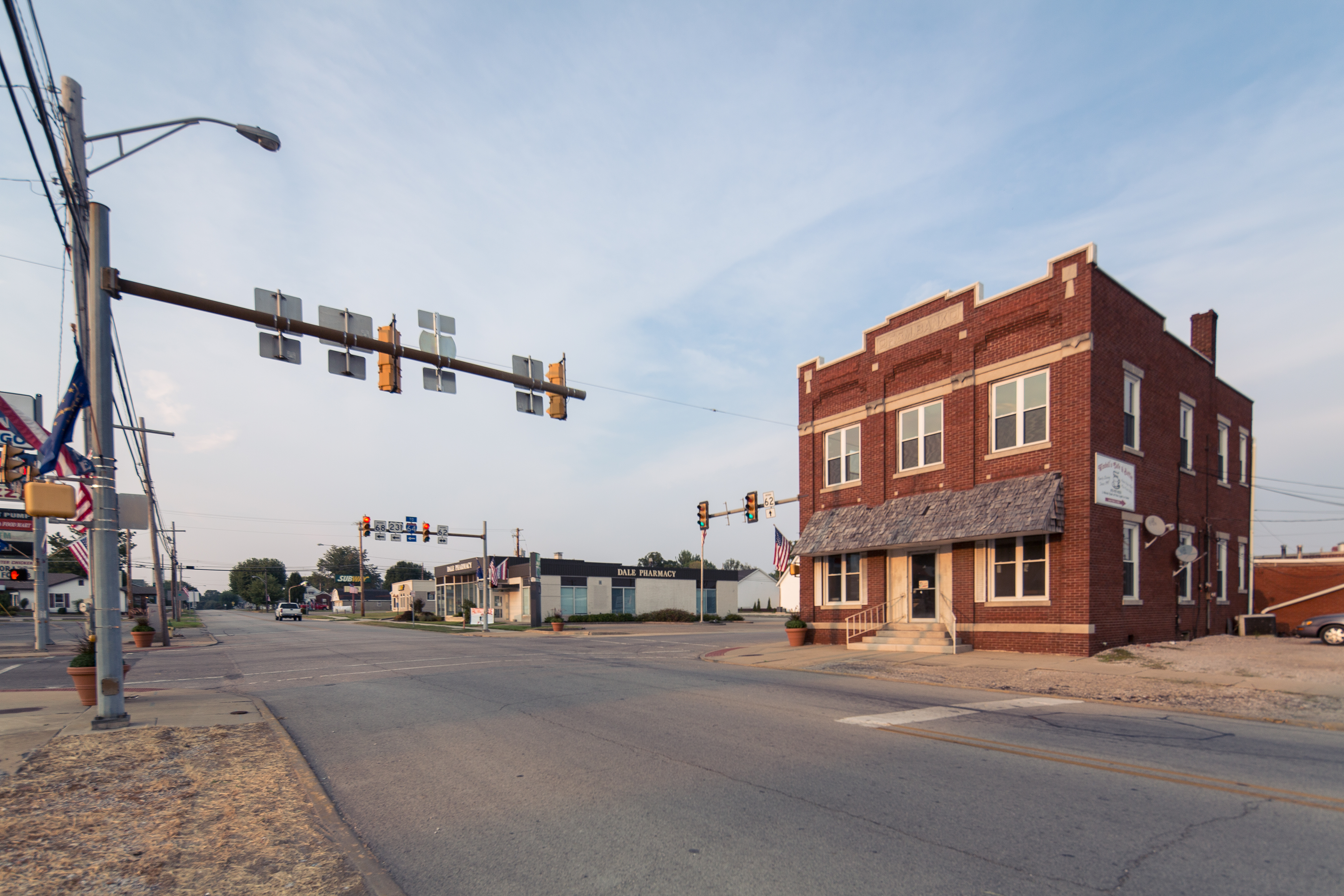

- Location of Dale in Spencer County, Indiana.
- Coordinates: 38°09′59″N 86°58′48″W
- Country: United States
- State: Indiana
- County: Spencer
- Township: Carter

Area
  - Total: 2.43 sq mi (6.29 km^{2})
  - Land: 2.42 sq mi (6.26 km^{2})
  - Water: 0.012 sq mi (0.03 km^{2})
- Elevation: 463 ft (141 m)

Population (2020)
  - Total: 1,544
  - Density: 638.9/sq mi (246.67/km^{2})
- Time zone: UTC-6 (CST)
  - Summer (DST): UTC-5 (CDT)
- ZIP code: 47523
- Area code: 812
- FIPS code: 18-16624
- GNIS feature ID: 2396674

Dale is a town in Carter Township, Spencer County, in the U.S. state of Indiana. The population was 1,544 at the 2020 census.

== History ==
Dale was originally called Elizabeth, and under the latter name was laid out in 1843. When a post office was established, the name was changed to Dale, in honor of Robert Dale Owen of New Harmony, the town's congressman at the time. The Dale post office has been in operation since 1844.

== Geography ==
According to the 2010 census, Dale has a total area of 1.56 square miles (4.04 km^{2}), of which 1.55 square miles (4.01 km^{2}) (or 99.36%) is land and 0.01 square miles (0.03 km^{2}) (or 0.64%) is water.

== Demographics ==
Historical population
Census	Pop.	Note	%±
1880	318		—
1890	659		107.2%
1900	624		−5.3%
1910	583		−6.6%
1920	688		18.0%
1930	770		11.9%
1940	763		−0.9%
1950	850		11.4%
1960	900		5.9%
1970	1,113		23.7%
1980	1,693		52.1%
1990	1,553		−8.3%
2000	1,568		1.0%
2010	1,593		1.6%
2020	1,544		−3.1%
U.S. Decennial Census

=== 2020 census ===
As of the 2020 census, Dale had a population of 1,544. The median age was 38.9 years. 26.1% of residents were under the age of 18 and 19.4% of residents were 65 years of age or older. For every 100 females there were 94.5 males, and for every 100 females age 18 and over there were 94.7 males age 18 and over.

0.0% of residents lived in urban areas, while 100.0% lived in rural areas.

There were 570 households in Dale, of which 34.2% had children under the age of 18 living in them. Of all households, 47.2% were married-couple households, 19.5% were households with a male householder and no spouse or partner present, and 27.2% were households with a female householder and no spouse or partner present. About 30.2% of all households were made up of individuals and 14.5% had someone living alone who was 65 years of age or older.

There were 621 housing units, of which 8.2% were vacant. The homeowner vacancy rate was 0.7% and the rental vacancy rate was 9.9%.

Racial composition as of the 2020 census
Race	Number	Percent
White	1,214	78.6%
Black or African American	14	0.9%
American Indian and Alaska Native	9	0.6%
Asian	1	0.1%
Native Hawaiian and Other Pacific Islander	0	0.0%
Some other race	162	10.5%
Two or more races	144	9.3%
Hispanic or Latino (of any race)	360	23.3%

=== 2010 census ===
As of the census of 2010, there were 1,593 people, 603 households, and 406 families living in the town. The population density was 1,027.7 inhabitants per square mile (396.8/km^{2}). There were 649 housing units at an average density of 418.7 per square mile (161.7/km^{2}). The racial makeup of the town was 84.6% White, 0.4% African American, 0.1% Native American, 0.6% Asian, 12.6% from other races, and 1.8% from two or more races. Hispanic or Latino of any race were 18.1% of the population.

There were 603 households, of which 35.3% had children under the age of 18 living with them, 51.6% were married couples living together, 10.9% had a female householder with no husband present, 4.8% had a male householder with no wife present, and 32.7% were non-families. 29.0% of all households were made up of individuals, and 14.1% had someone living alone who was 65 years of age or older. The average household size was 2.50 and the average family size was 3.08.

The median age in the town was 37.9 years. 24.9% of residents were under the age of 18; 7.6% were between the ages of 18 and 24; 24.3% were from 25 to 44; 27.3% were from 45 to 64; and 15.8% were 65 years of age or older. The gender makeup of the town was 50.4% male and 49.6% female.

=== 2000 census ===
As of the census of 2000, there were 1,570 people, 591 households, and 414 families living in the town. The population density was 1,025.4 inhabitants per square mile (395.9/km^{2}). There were 630 housing units at an average density of 412.0 per square mile (159.1/km^{2}). The racial makeup of the town was 92.35% White, 1.02% African American, 6.12% from other races, and 0.51% from two or more races. Hispanic or Latino of any race were 9.44% of the population.

There were 591 households, out of which 31.6% had children under the age of 18 living with them, 55.2% were married couples living together, 10.7% had a female householder with no husband present, and 29.9% were non-families. 26.7% of all households were made up of individuals, and 13.9% had someone living alone who was 65 years of age or older. The average household size was 2.53 and the average family size was 3.05.

In the town, the population was spread out, with 24.5% under the age of 18, 9.2% from 18 to 24, 28.2% from 25 to 44, 20.7% from 45 to 64, and 17.4% who were 65 years of age or older. The median age was 37 years. For every 100 females, there were 90.8 males. For every 100 females age 18 and over, there were 91.6 males.

The median income for a household in the town was $36,295, and the median income for a family was $42,969. Males had a median income of $29,018 versus $22,545 for females. The per capita income for the town was $16,163. About 2.7% of families and 4.5% of the population were below the poverty line, including 4.6% of those under age 18 and 2.6% of those age 65 or over.

== Education ==
It is in the North Spencer County School Corporation. Dale has a public elementary school, David Turnham Elementary School.

Prior to 1972, the community had its own high school. The school colors were black and gold, and the mascot was the golden aces. In 1972 the school merged into Heritage Hills High School.

Dale has a public library, a branch of the Lincoln Heritage Public Library.

== Transportation ==
The Indiana Department of Transportation, as part of the Major Moves transportation program, in 2011 completed a four-lane, limited access highway bypass that carries U.S. Route 231 around the west side of Dale. The town now has access points at Indiana 62 on the town's south side, Indiana 68 on the west side, and Spencer County Road 2050 North (a new roadway) on the north side.

County Road 2050 North provides access to two hotels, a restaurant, gas station and residences that were formerly accessed from the old interchange of U.S. 231 with Interstate 64. That diamond interchange and overpass were eliminated in favor of a partial-cloverleaf interchange located slightly to the west, necessitating the access road.

== Notable people ==
- Del Harris, basketball coach, was born in Dale; returned to coach local high school
- Florence Henderson, singer and actress, co-star of The Brady Bunch; was born in Dale
- Roger Kaiser, basketball player
- J. Clarence Karcher, geophysicist and inventor of the reflection seismograph; was born in Dale
- Abraham Lincoln, U.S. president, was raised on a farm near what is now Lincoln City. His mother, Nancy Hanks Lincoln, died while he was young; her burial site is located on the original farm.

== See also ==
- Thermwood Corporation, a major employer in the town
