= Huff Township, Spencer County, Indiana =

Huff Township
- Township
- Coordinates: 38°01′57″N 86°51′03″W
- Country: United States
- State: Indiana
- County: Spencer

Government
  - Type: Indiana township

Area
  - Total: 43.16 sq mi (111.8 km^{2})
  - Land: 42.36 sq mi (109.7 km^{2})
  - Water: 0.8 sq mi (2.1 km^{2})
- Elevation: 390 ft (120 m)

Population (2020)
  - Total: 1,058
  - Density: 24.98/sq mi (9.643/km^{2})
- FIPS code: 18-35140
- GNIS feature ID: 453423

Huff Township is one of nine townships in Spencer County, Indiana. As of the 2020 census, its population was 1,058 and it contained 460 housing units.

Historical population
| Census | Pop. | Note | %± |
|---|---|---|---|
| 1890 | 1,692 | | — |
| 1900 | 1,612 | | −4.7% |
| 1910 | 1,357 | | −15.8% |
| 1920 | 1,318 | | −2.9% |
| 1930 | 1,167 | | −11.5% |
| 1940 | 1,092 | | −6.4% |
| 1950 | 1,015 | | −7.1% |
| 1960 | 946 | | −6.8% |
| 1970 | 1,022 | | 8.0% |
| 1980 | 1,034 | | 1.2% |
| 1990 | 1,047 | | 1.3% |
| 2000 | 1,089 | | 4.0% |
| 2010 | 1,156 | | 6.2% |
| 2020 | 1,058 | | −8.5% |
Source: US Decennial Census

== History ==
Huff Township was organized in 1837, and named for Aquilla Huff.

== Geography ==
According to the 2010 census, the township has a total area of 43.16 square miles (111.8 km^{2}), of which 42.36 square miles (109.7 km^{2}) (or 98.15%) is land and 0.8 square miles (2.1 km^{2}) (or 1.85%) is water.

=== Unincorporated towns ===
- Evanston
- Maxville
- New Boston

== History ==
=== Former post offices ===
- Schley
