= Gentryville, Indiana =

- Town
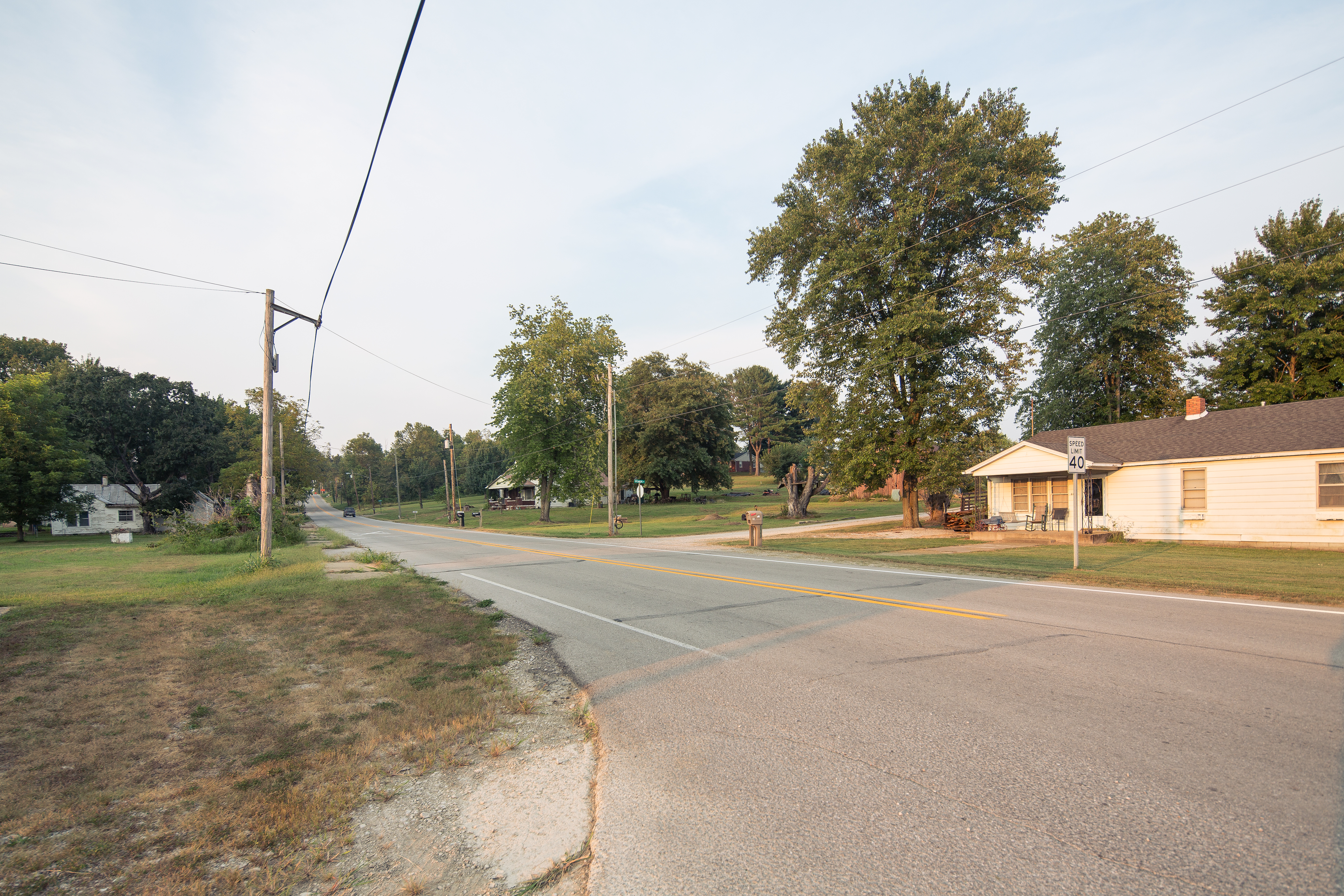

- Location of Gentryville in Spencer County, Indiana
- Coordinates: 38°06′33″N 87°01′53″W
- Country: United States
- State: Indiana
- County: Spencer
- Township: Jackson

Area
  - Total: 0.39 sq mi (1.02 km^{2})
  - Land: 0.39 sq mi (1.02 km^{2})
  - Water: 0 sq mi (0.00 km^{2}) 0%
- Elevation: 466 ft (142 m)

Population (2020)
  - Total: 243
  - Density: 616.6/sq mi (238.06/km^{2})
- Time zone: UTC-6 (CST)
  - Summer (DST): UTC-5 (CDT)
- ZIP code: 47537
- Area code: 812
- FIPS code: 18-27270
- GNIS feature ID: 2396957

Gentryville is a town in Jackson Township, Spencer County, in the U.S. state of Indiana. The population was 243 at the 2020 census.

== History ==
Gentryville was platted in December 1854, and named for James Gentry, an early settler and local businessman. Earlier, in the late 1820s, Abraham Lincoln worked as a clerk, and often slept, in a general store Gentryville, operated by William Jones. (Lincoln: A Self Made Man, Sidney Blumenthal 2016, pp. 35–36).

The Gentryville post office has been in operation since 1826.

== Geography ==
According to the 2010 census, Gentryville has a total area of 0.39 square miles (1.01 km^{2}), all land.

== Demographics ==
Historical population
Census	Pop.	Note	%±
1900	464		—
1910	383		−17.5%
1920	291		−24.0%
1930	271		−6.9%
1940	258		−4.8%
1950	234		−9.3%
1960	297		26.9%
1970	281		−5.4%
1980	299		6.4%
1990	277		−7.4%
2000	262		−5.4%
2010	268		2.3%
2020	243		−9.3%
U.S. Decennial Census

=== 2010 census ===
As of the census of 2010, there were 268 people, 110 households, and 79 families living in the town. The population density was 687.2 inhabitants per square mile (265.3/km^{2}). There were 118 housing units at an average density of 302.6 per square mile (116.8/km^{2}). The racial makeup of the town was 95.9% White, 1.1% African American, 1.9% Native American, 0.7% from other races, and 0.4% from two or more races. Hispanic or Latino of any race were 1.1% of the population.

There were 110 households, of which 27.3% had children under the age of 18 living with them, 55.5% were married couples living together, 8.2% had a female householder with no husband present, 8.2% had a male householder with no wife present, and 28.2% were non-families. 21.8% of all households were made up of individuals, and 7.3% had someone living alone who was 65 years of age or older. The average household size was 2.44 and the average family size was 2.75.

The median age in the town was 44.4 years. 19% of residents were under the age of 18; 8.3% were between the ages of 18 and 24; 23.9% were from 25 to 44; 32.5% were from 45 to 64; and 16.4% were 65 years of age or older. The gender makeup of the town was 47.8% male and 52.2% female.

=== 2000 census ===
As of the census of 2000, there were 262 people, 95 households, and 81 families living in the town. The population density was 674.1 inhabitants per square mile (260.3/km^{2}). There were 106 housing units at an average density of 272.7 per square mile (105.3/km^{2}). The racial makeup of the town was 96.18% White, 1.15% Native American, 0.38% Asian, 0.76% from other races, and 1.53% from two or more races. Hispanic or Latino of any race were 3.05% of the population.

There were 95 households, out of which 41.1% had children under the age of 18 living with them, 67.4% were married couples living together, 11.6% had a female householder with no husband present, and 14.7% were non-families. 12.6% of all households were made up of individuals, and 5.3% had someone living alone who was 65 years of age or older. The average household size was 2.76 and the average family size was 2.95.

In the town, the population was spread out, with 26.3% under the age of 18, 9.9% from 18 to 24, 27.1% from 25 to 44, 22.5% from 45 to 64, and 14.1% who were 65 years of age or older. The median age was 37 years. For every 100 females, there were 92.6 males. For every 100 females age 18 and over, there were 94.9 males.

The median income for a household in the town was $38,750, and the median income for a family was $41,750. Males had a median income of $29,375 versus $23,542 for females. The per capita income for the town was $15,752. About 5.1% of families and 9.6% of the population were below the poverty line, including 14.5% of those under the age of eighteen and none of those 65 or over.

== Recent roadway developments ==
In March 2011, U.S. 231 was relocated to a new four-lane highway approximately four miles east of Gentryville. Indiana 62 and Indiana 162 continue to pass through the community. Indiana 62 utilizes the former route of U.S. 231.

== Education ==
Gentryville is part of the North Spencer County School Corporation.

Prior to 1948, the community had its own high school. The school colors were green and white, and the mascot was the pirates. That year, the school district was dissolved. The Chrisney school district took some areas and the Dale School District took other areas. The high schools of those two districts consolidated in 1972.

== See also ==
- Colonel William Jones House, National Register of Historic Places listing
