= Carter Township, Spencer County, Indiana =

Carter Township
- Township
- Coordinates: 38°09′21″N 86°57′32″W
- Country: United States
- State: Indiana
- County: Spencer

Government
  - Type: Indiana township

Area
  - Total: 36.09 sq mi (93.5 km^{2})
  - Land: 35.84 sq mi (92.8 km^{2})
  - Water: 0.26 sq mi (0.67 km^{2})
- Elevation: 528 ft (161 m)

Population (2020)
  - Total: 3,228
  - Density: 90.07/sq mi (34.78/km^{2})
- FIPS code: 18-10576
- GNIS feature ID: 453161

Carter Township is one of nine townships in Spencer County, Indiana. As of the 2020 census, its population was 3,228 and it contained 1,311 housing units.

Historical population
Census	Pop.	Note	%±
1890	2,125		—
1900	2,133		0.4%
1910	2,065		−3.2%
1920	2,117		2.5%
1930	2,091		−1.2%
1940	1,991		−4.8%
1950	2,019		1.4%
1960	2,198		8.9%
1970	2,409		9.6%
1980	3,160		31.2%
1990	3,032		−4.1%
2000	3,121		2.9%
2010	3,258		4.4%
2020	3,228		−0.9%
Source: US Decennial Census

== History ==
Carter Township was named for Thomas Carter, a county commissioner.

== Geography ==
According to the 2010 census, the township has a total area of 36.09 square miles (93.5 km^{2}), of which 35.84 square miles (92.8 km^{2}) (or 99.31%) is land and 0.26 square miles (0.67 km^{2}) (or 0.72%) is water.

=== Cities and towns ===
- Dale
- Santa Claus

=== Unincorporated towns ===
- Lincoln City
- Mariah Hill
