= Clay Township, Spencer County, Indiana =

Clay Township
- Township
- Coordinates: 38°04′25″N 86°57′16″W
- Country: United States
- State: Indiana
- County: Spencer

Government
  - Type: Indiana township

Area
  - Total: 37.24 sq mi (96.5 km^{2})
  - Land: 36.39 sq mi (94.2 km^{2})
  - Water: 0.85 sq mi (2.2 km^{2})
- Elevation: 449 ft (137 m)

Population (2020)
  - Total: 2,862
  - Density: 78.65/sq mi (30.37/km^{2})
- FIPS code: 18-13240
- GNIS feature ID: 453219

Clay Township is one of nine townships in Spencer County, Indiana. As of the 2020 census, its population was 2,862 and it contained 1,216 housing units.

Historical population
Census	Pop.	Note	%±
1890	1,644		—
1900	1,353		−17.7%
1910	1,282		−5.2%
1920	1,164		−9.2%
1930	857		−26.4%
1940	820		−4.3%
1950	767		−6.5%
1960	631		−17.7%
1970	596		−5.5%
1980	996		67.1%
1990	1,467		47.3%
2000	2,494		70.0%
2010	2,801		12.3%
2020	2,862		2.2%
Source: US Decennial Census

== History ==
Clay Township was the last township of Spencer County to be organized, because the rolling hills and relatively poor soil attracted fewer settlers than other areas in the vicinity.

== Geography ==
According to the 2010 census, the township has a total area of 37.24 square miles (96.5 km^{2}), of which 36.39 square miles (94.2 km^{2}) (or 97.72%) is land and 0.85 square miles (2.2 km^{2}) (or 2.28%) is water.

=== Cities and towns ===
- Santa Claus

=== Unincorporated towns ===
- Buffaloville
- Clay City
- Kercheval
- Lamar
- Liberal

== Places of interest ==
Lincoln Boyhood National Memorial lies within the township boundaries.
