= Lincoln Pioneer Village =

- U.S. National Register of Historic Places
- U.S. Historic district
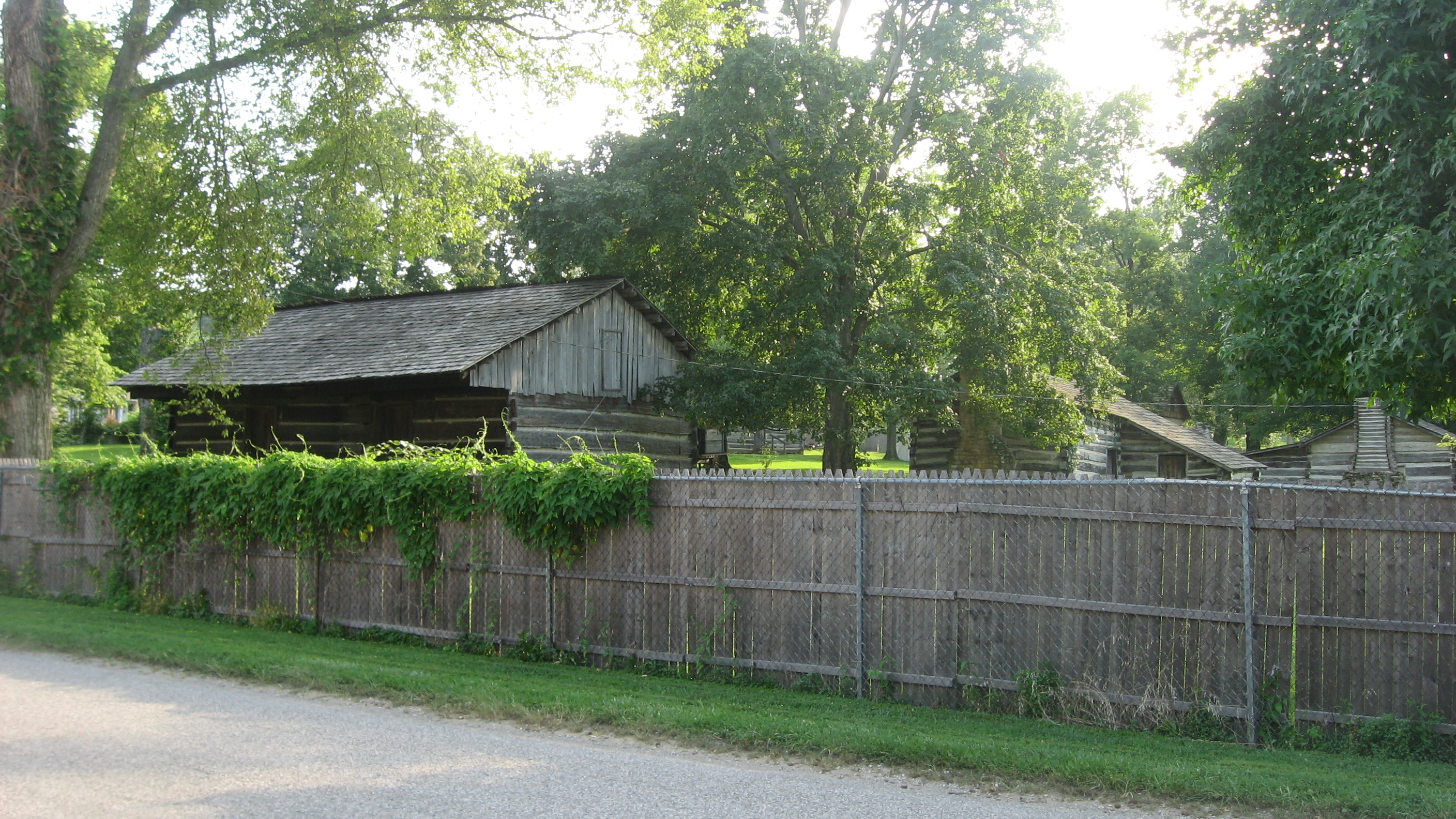
- From 9th Street, in July 2011

- Location within Indiana
- Location: Junction of 9th St. and Eureka Rd., Rockport, Indiana
- Coordinates: 37°52′48″N 87°3′28″W
- Area: 1.8 acres (0.73 ha)
- Built: 1935
- Built by: WPA/FERA
- Architect: George Honig
- Architectural style: Split log cabin
- NRHP reference No.: 98000305
- Added to NRHP: April 20, 1998

Lincoln Pioneer Village is a memorial along the Ohio River in Rockport, Indiana to President Abraham Lincoln who lived in the county during his boyhood years. It was built in 1934 and 1935 in the city park by the Works Progress Administration. George Honig, an artist and sculptor from Spencer County, designed the memorial. He also oversaw the building of the pioneer village replica, which was sponsored by the Spencer County Historical Society and the Rockport City Council. It was listed as a historic district on the National Register of Historic Places on April 20, 1998.

== Overview ==
Rockport is the county seat for Spencer County and 17 miles from where Lincoln was raised. In Rockport, Lincoln borrowed books from John Pitcher, a lawyer, and set off with Allen Gentry on flatboat trips to New Orleans.

The village replica was built near the boat landing that Lincoln used for his flatboat trips. A wooden stockade surrounds the village, which contains a replica of the old Little Pigeon Baptist Church, log cabin school house, school, an inn, houses, and a law office. The cabins represent the homes of people that lived in the community (Little Pigeon Creek Community) where Lincoln was raised and is furnished in keeping with the frontier times and lifestyle, including spinning wheels, churns, handmade chairs, iron pans, tables, beds, dishes and other furnishings.

The houses include those of his sister Sarah Lincoln Grigsby and brother-in-law Aaron Grigsby, merchant and farmer James Gentry, and neighbor Josiah Crawford, who employed Abraham and Sarah Lincoln. The Aunt Lepha Mackey (Note: Lepha's surname is also spelled McCay and McKey) Cabin represents the home of the Rockport woman who took in and taught African American children, who would not have otherwise had an education. Mackey's cabin was the site of first school for African American children in southern Indiana. The village also includes a replica of John Pritcher's Rockport law office and the William Jones store.

== Buildings ==
The village buildings include:

- Administration Building and Museum Room
- John Pritcher Law Office
- Azel Dorsey House
- Daniel Grass House
- Aunt Lepha Mackey House
- Gentry Mansion
- Former Home of Rueben Grigsby
- Pigeon Creek Baptist Church
- Brown's Inn
- Lincoln Cabin
- Market and Barter House
- Grandview Blockhouse
- Mr. and Mrs. Josiah Crawford House
- William Jones store

== In popular culture ==
- The movie The Kentuckian was filmed at Lincoln Pioneer Village

== See also ==
- Lincoln Boyhood National Memorial
- Lincoln State Park, state park with Little Pigeon Creek Community buildings
- Little Pigeon Creek Community, where the Lincolns lived 1816–1830
