= Lincoln Boyhood Home =

Lincoln Boyhood Home could refer to

- Knob Creek Farm - where Abraham Lincoln lived from 1811 to 1816 in LaRue County, Kentucky
- Lincoln Boyhood National Memorial - where Abraham Lincoln lived from 1816 to 1830 in Spencer County, Indiana
