= Nancy Lincoln =

Mother of Abraham Lincoln (1784–1818)

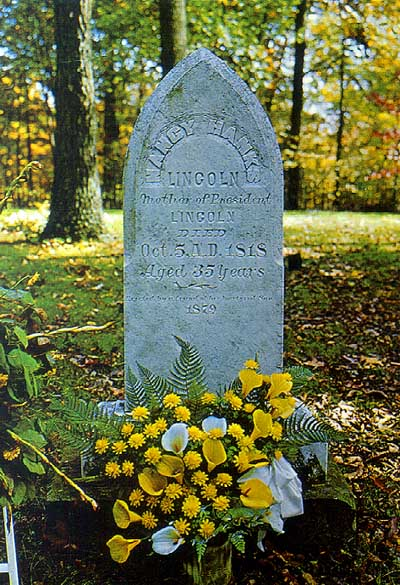
- Grave stone of Lincoln
- Born: Nancy Hanks; February 5, 1784; Hampshire County, Virginia, U.S. (now Mineral County, West Virginia, U.S.)
- Died: October 5, 1818 (aged 34); Spencer County, Indiana, U.S.
- Known for: Mother of Abraham Lincoln
- Spouse: Thomas Lincoln (m. 1806)
- Children: Abraham Lincoln; Sarah Lincoln Grigsby; Thomas Lincoln Jr.
- Parent: Lucy Hanks
- Relatives: Joseph Hanks (grandfather); John Hanks (cousin); Larry Hanks (distant cousin); Tom Hanks (distant cousin); Jim Hanks (distant cousin); Chet Hanks (distant cousin); Colin Hanks (distant cousin); Camille Cosby (distant cousin)

Nancy Lincoln (née Hanks; February 5, 1784 – October 5, 1818) was the mother of U.S. President Abraham Lincoln. Her marriage to Thomas Lincoln also produced daughter Sarah and son Thomas Jr. In 1816, when Nancy and Thomas had been married for just over 10 years, the family moved from Kentucky to western Perry County, Indiana; when Spencer County was formed in 1818, the Lincoln homestead lay within its current boundaries. Nancy Lincoln died from milk sickness or consumption in 1818 at the Little Pigeon Creek Community in Spencer County when Abraham was nine years old.

== Biography ==
=== Early life and education ===
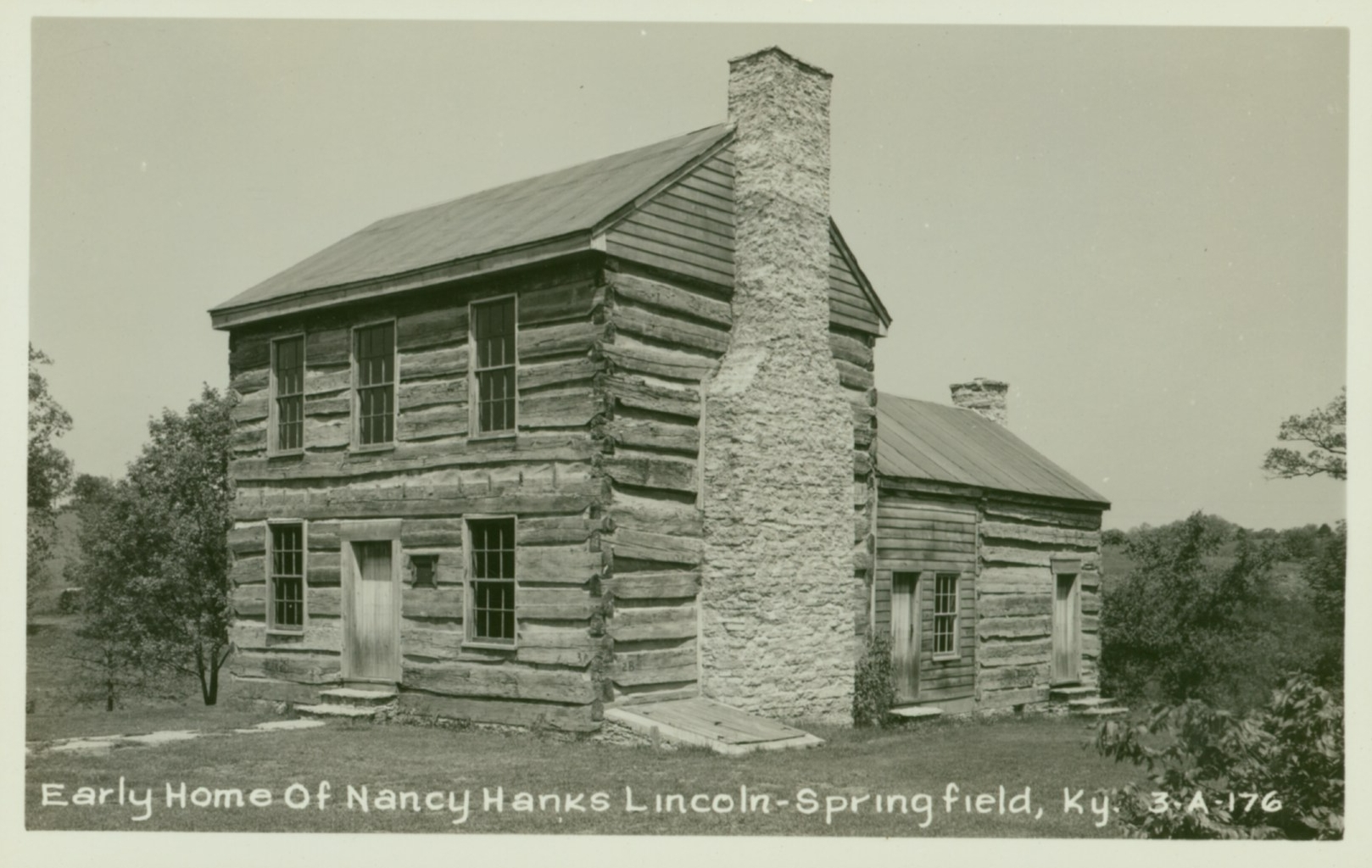
Early home of Nancy Hanks Lincoln in Springfield, Kentucky

A popular theory among historians and genealogists, and supported by a mtDNA study in 2015, Nancy's mother was Lucy Hanks, who married Henry Sparrow in 1790 in Mercer County, Kentucky. (Note: Independent researchers determined in 2015 that Nancy Hanks Lincoln was the daughter of Lucy Hanks, the daughter of farmers Anna Lee and Joseph Hanks from the Nancy Hanks Lincoln mtDNA Study. The information was published in For the People, a newsletter of the Abraham Lincoln Association. Gene By Gene Ltd. in Houston, Texas performed the lab testing using mtDNA from five matrilineal descendants of Joseph and Ann Lee Hanks. However, it has not been published in a peer-reviewed scholarly scientific journal. The article states, "Because there are no living descendants in the Nancy Hanks Lincoln / Abraham Lincoln / Robert T. Lincoln line, nor any extant DNA chain for them, it is possible only to analyze data from daughters, sisters, or aunts of Sarah Hanks, Lucey Hanks, or Ann Lee Hanks.")

Abraham Lincoln's law partner William Herndon reported that Lincoln told him that his maternal grandfather was "a well-bred Virginia farmer or planter." According to William E. Barton in The Life of Abraham Lincoln and Michael Burkhimer in 100 Essential Lincoln Books, Nancy was most likely born illegitimate and her family created stories to lead Abraham to believe he was a legitimate member of the Sparrow family.

It is believed that Nancy Hanks' grandparents were Ann and Joseph Hanks and that they raised her from infancy until her grandfather died when she was about nine years old. At the time of Nancy's birth, Joseph and his wife and children were all living on 108 acres near Patterson Creek in then-Hampshire County, Virginia (now Mineral County, West Virginia). In March 1784, Joseph Hanks sold his property via a mortgage and moved his wife, eight children and young granddaughter Nancy to Kentucky.

The family lived on land along Pottinger's Creek, in a settlement called Rolling Fork in Nelson County, Kentucky, until patriarch Joseph's death in 1793. Nancy's grandmother, who was called by the more formal name Ann rather than the common nickname of Nancy, decided to return to her homeland, Farnham parish in Virginia, and Nancy went to live with her mother, now Lucy Hanks Sparrow, having married Henry Sparrow in Harrodsburg, Kentucky two or three years earlier.

After Lucy's sister Elizabeth Hanks married Henry Sparrow's brother Thomas in Mercer County, Kentucky in 1796, Nancy, now about age 12, went to live with the couple, whom she called mother and father. She was known as Nancy Sparrow and was described as "intelligent, deeply religious, kindly and affectionate." Lucy's sister gave birth to an illegitimate son in 1799 named Dennis Friend Hanks, who was also raised by Elizabeth and Thomas Sparrow.

At the home of Elizabeth and Thomas Sparrow, Nancy would have learned the skills and crafts a woman needed on the frontier to cultivate crops and clothe and feed her family. She learned to read the Bible and became an excellent seamstress, working at the Richard Berry home before her marriage.

Lucy's marriage to Henry Sparrow produced eight children, and Lucy had a reputation as a "fine Christian woman." Two sons were loyal to the Union during the Civil War and were preachers.

==== Timeline of events and relationships ====
While grandfather is alive
Unclear (1)
"Adopted"
Unclear (2)
Marriage until death
│
1784
│
1785
│
1786
│
1787
│
1788
│
1789
│
1790
│
1791
│
1792
│
1793
│
1794
│
1795
│
1796
│
1797
│
1798
│
1799
│
1800
│
1801
│
1802
│
1803
│
1804
│
1805
│
1806
│
1807
│
1808
│
1809
│
1810
│
1811
│
1812
│
1813
│
1814
│
1815
│
1816
│
1817
│
1818
(1) It is unclear whether Nancy Hanks lived the entire three years (1793–1796) with her mother prior to moving in with her aunt and uncle, Elizabeth and Thomas Sparrow; (2) It is unclear when Nancy started working for the Berrys.

=== Marriage and family ===
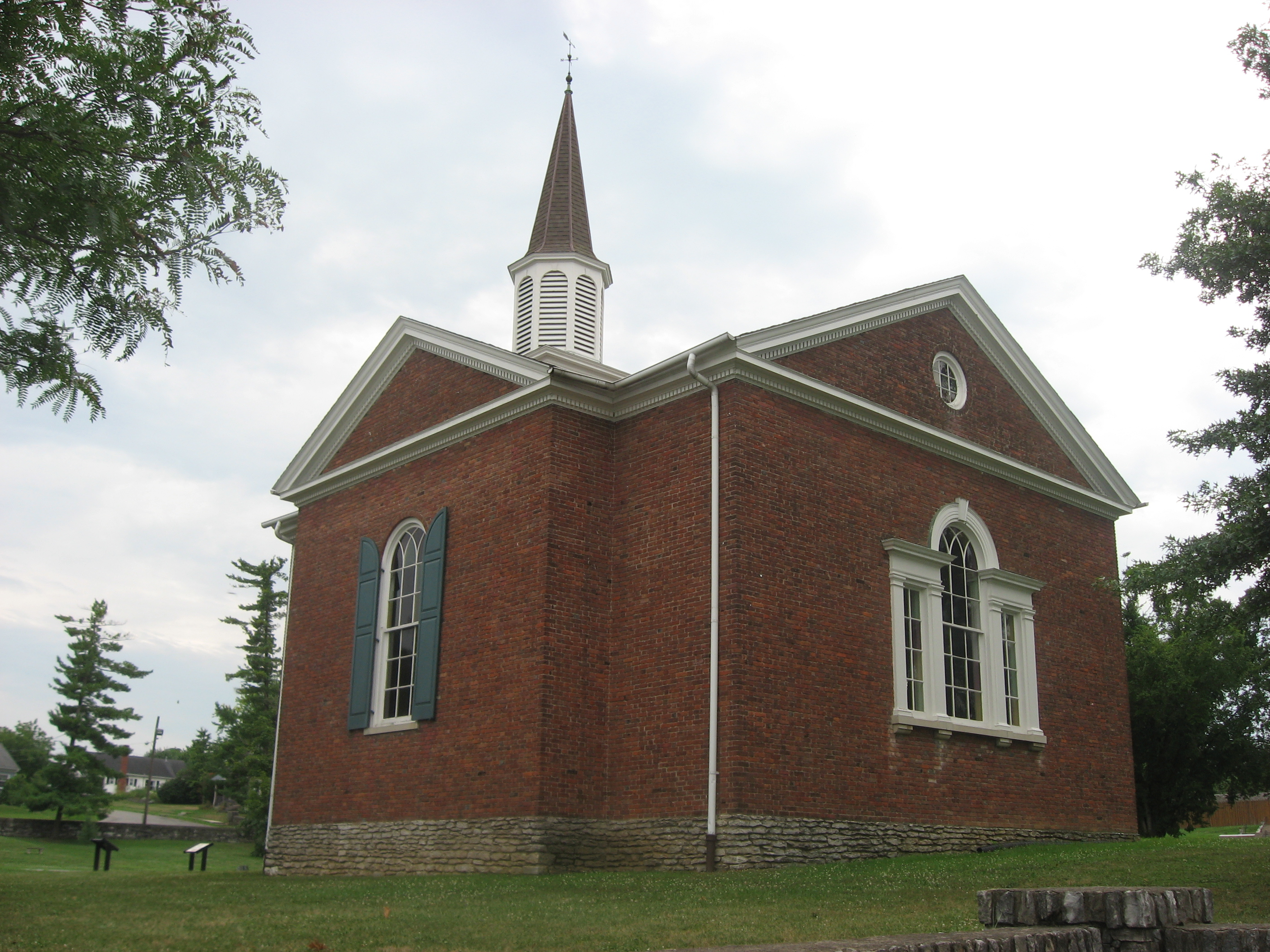
Rear of the Lincoln Marriage Temple, which shelters the cabin in which Thomas Lincoln married Nancy Hanks. Built in 1931, it is part of Old Fort Harrod State Park in Harrodsburg, Kentucky.

On June 12, 1806, Hanks married Thomas Lincoln at Beechland, the home of Richard Berry, by Reverend Jesse Head. Nancy was brought to the home to work as a seamstress by her friend Polly Ewing Berry, the wife of Richard Berry Jr. since October 10, 1794. Polly was a friend of Nancy's from Mercer County, Kentucky, and Richard Berry Jr. was a good friend of Thomas Lincoln. Lincoln proposed to her in his childhood home at what is now Lincoln Homestead State Park or in the Francis Berry house in front of the fireplace.

Nancy's marriage bond was signed by Richard Berry Jr., who identified himself as her guardian. Per Warren, "The title had no legal significance, Berry having never been so appointed, and Nancy Hanks was then of age. But to him to call himself 'guardian' was a courtesy customary under such circumstances [no father able to sign the marriage bond]." A record of their marriage license is held at the county courthouse.

They had three children:

- Sarah Lincoln (February 10, 1807 – January 20, 1828)
- Abraham Lincoln (February 12, 1809 – April 15, 1865)
- Thomas Lincoln Jr. (died in infancy, 1812)

The young family lived in what was then Hardin County, Kentucky, (now LaRue) on the Knob Creek Farm. Neighbors reported that Nancy Hanks Lincoln was "superior" to her husband, a mild yet strong personality who taught young Abraham his letters as well as the extraordinary sweetness and forbearance for which he was later known. In 1816, the year that Indiana became the 19th state, the Lincoln family moved to Spencer County in southern Indiana and proceeded to homestead at Little Pigeon Creek Settlement (now Lincoln Boyhood National Memorial). Elizabeth and Thomas Sparrow and Dennis Hanks settled at Little Pigeon Creek the following fall, having lived in a shelter in which the Lincolns had lived until they built their cabin. While Abraham was ten years younger than his second cousin Dennis, the boys were good friends.

=== Description ===
William Herndon, author of Life of Lincoln, describes Nancy Hanks Lincoln:

She was above the ordinary height in stature, weighed about 130 pounds, was slenderly built, and had much the appearance of one inclined to consumption. Her skin was dark; hair dark brown; eyes gray and small; forehead prominent; face sharp and angular, with a marked expression for melancholy which fixed itself in the memory of all who ever saw or knew her. Though her life was clouded by a spirit of sadness, she was in disposition amiable and generally cheerful. (Note: William Herndon's accounts of Nancy Hanks Lincoln are based upon interviews with Dennis Hanks, who lived near and with the Lincolns in his childhood, John Hanks and Sara Bush Johnson Lincoln.)

Nancy was also described as "a bold, reckless, daredevil kind of woman, stepping on to the very verge of propriety."

Abraham Lincoln inherited his mother's appearance and manner. She was "mild, tender, and intellectually inclined."

=== Death ===
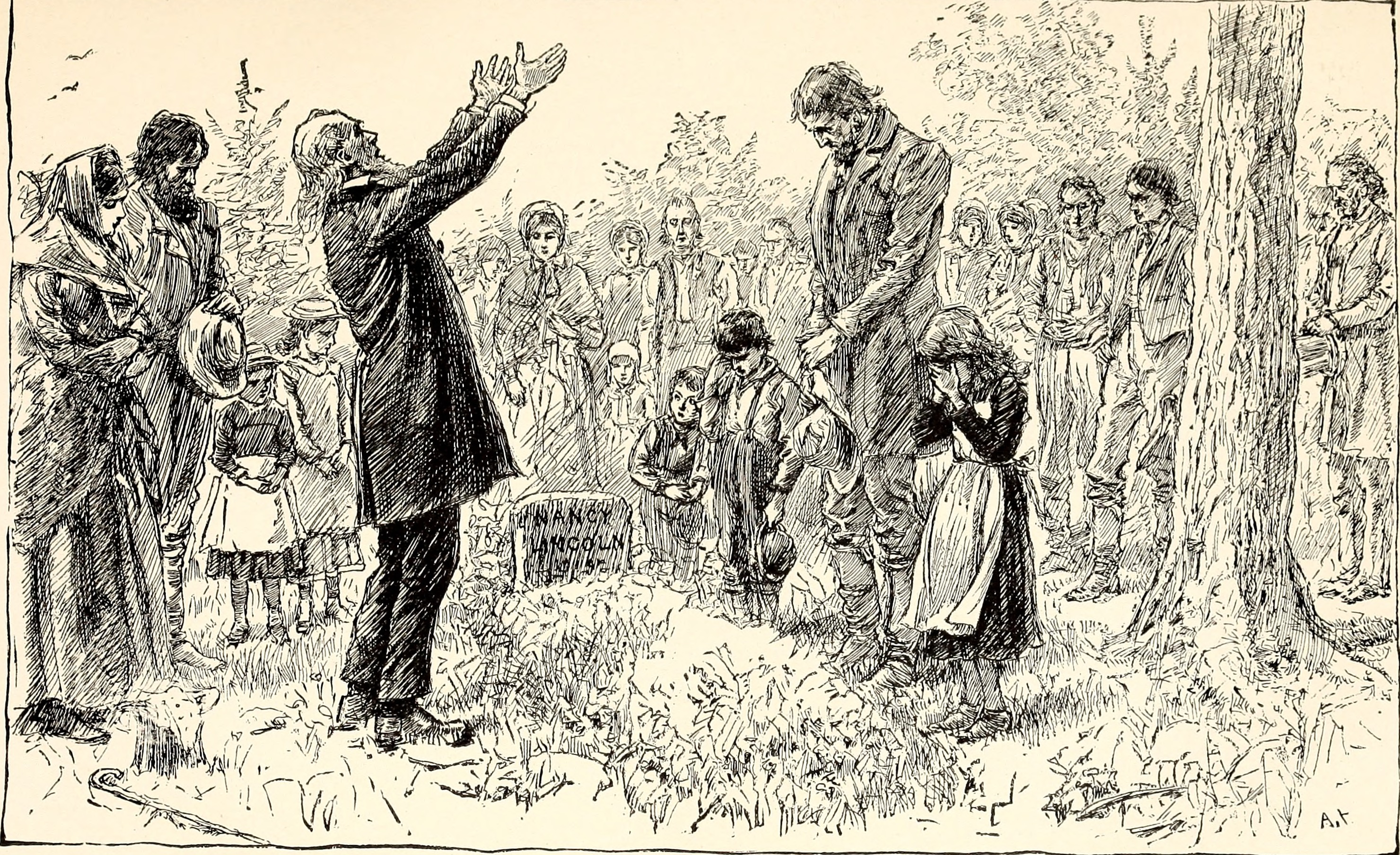
A later rendering of the funeral service of Nancy Lincoln, from Abraham Lincoln and the downfall of American slavery (1888/1894/1914) by Noah Brooks.

While living at Little Pigeon Creek Settlement, Nancy Hanks Lincoln died on October 5, 1818, age 34. Her nine-year-old son Abraham assisted his father in the making of her coffin by whittling the wooden pegs that held the planks together. Eleven-year-old Sarah cared for Abraham until their father remarried the next year.

There are two views on the cause of Nancy Hanks Lincoln's death. One view is that she died of "milk sickness." Several people had died that fall from the illness, including Elizabeth and Thomas Sparrow, who raised her, then lived with her on the Lincolns' property at the Little Pigeon Creek settlement. The Sparrows died in September, weeks before Nancy's death, and Dennis moved in with the Lincolns. (Note: Dennis married one of Abraham's stepmother's daughters named Sara Elizabeth in 1821.) The illness was caused by drinking the milk or eating the meat of cows that had eaten white snakeroot. The plant contains the potent toxin tremetol, which is passed through the milk. The migrants from the East were unfamiliar with the Midwestern plant and its effects. In the 19th century before people understood the cause of the illness, thousands in the Midwest died of milk sickness.

The second view is that Nancy died of consumption. In 1870 Lincoln's law partner and biographer, William Herndon, wrote to fellow Lincoln biographer Ward Lamon saying that "Mrs. Lincoln died as said by some with the milk sickness, some with a galloping quick consumption", i.e. a wasting disease or tuberculosis. It has also been theorized that Nancy Lincoln had a marfanoid body habitus (or a marfanoid type of physique) with the same unusual facial features as her son. This theory suggests that she died of cancer (which is a wasting disease) related to multiple endocrine neoplasia type 2b (MEN2B), and that she passed the gene for this syndrome to her son (see Medical and mental health of Abraham Lincoln).

Nancy's grave is located in what has been named the Pioneer Cemetery, also known as the Nancy Hanks Lincoln Cemetery. Her headstone was purchased by Peter Studebaker, an industrialist from South Bend, in 1878. At least 20 unmarked and eight marked graves are at the site; Nancy Lincoln is buried next to Nancy Rusher Brooner, a neighbor who died a week before Nancy from milk sickness. Henry Brooner, Nancy Brooner's son and best childhood friend of Abraham Lincoln, later recalled, "I remember very distinctly that when Mrs. Lincoln's grave was filled, my father, Peter Brooner, extended his hand to Thomas Lincoln and said, 'We are brothers now', meaning that they were brothers in the same kind of sorrow. The bodies of my mother and Mrs. Lincoln were conveyed to their graves on sleds." Her aunt and uncle Elizabeth (Hanks) and Thomas Sparrow, also her childhood caregivers, are buried nearby. The cemetery is located on the grounds of the Lincoln Boyhood National Memorial, a National Historic Landmark District managed by the National Park Service in present-day Lincoln City, Indiana.

== Honors ==
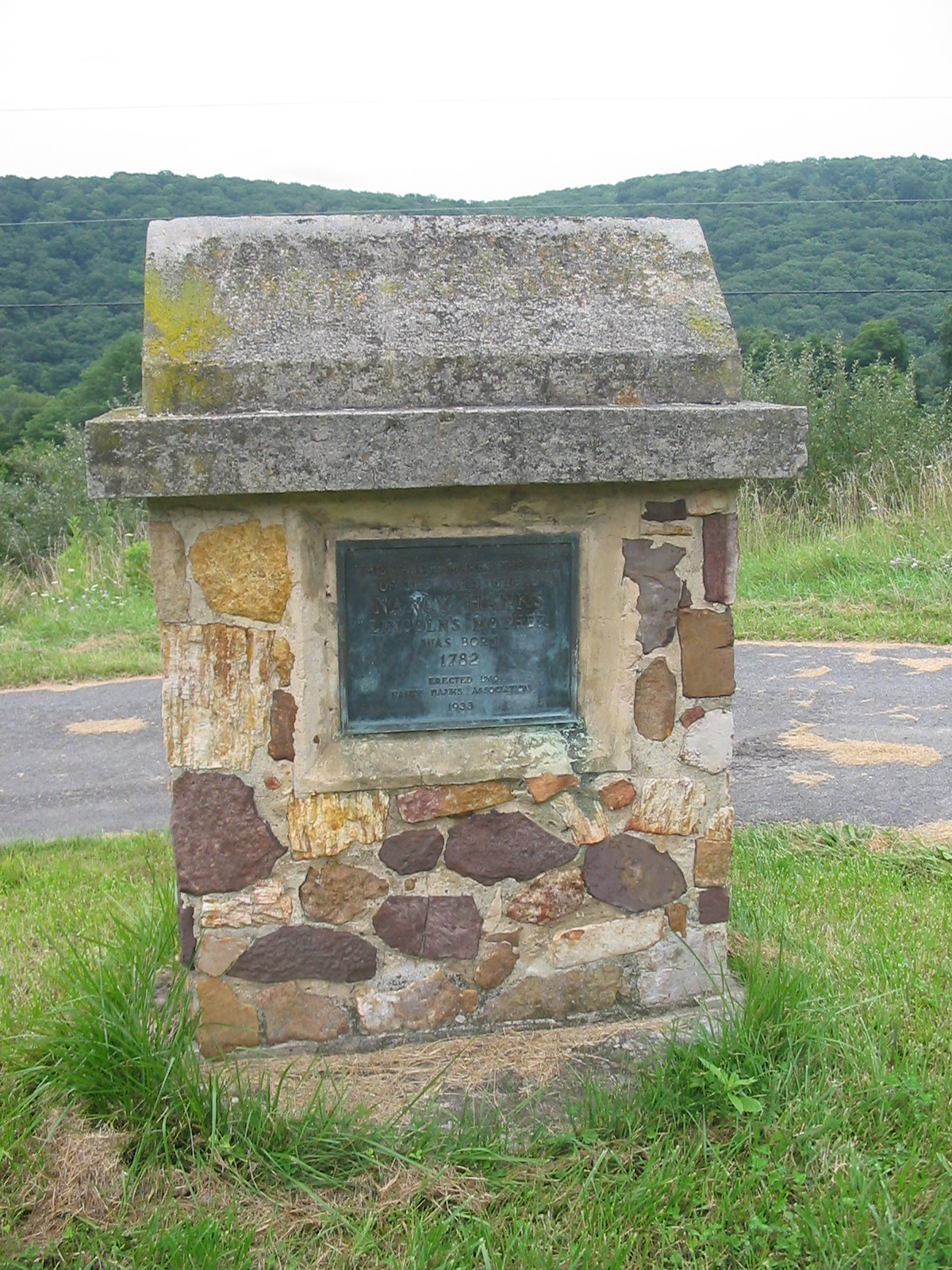
Memorial to Nancy Hanks in Mineral County, West Virginia, at the site of her birth.

- In 1941, Katherine K. Davis, who co-wrote the lyrics to "The Little Drummer Boy", wrote the music for the ballad "Nancy Hanks" as a tribute to Lincoln's mother. The song uses as its lyrics the Rosemary Benét poem "Nancy Hanks" (originally published in Stephen Vincent Benét's A Book of Americans). An edited version of the poem was used by John Ford in the beginning of his 1939 movie Young Mr. Lincoln:

If Nancy Hanks
Came back as a ghost,
Seeking news
Of what she loved most,
She'd ask first
"Where's my son?
What's happened to Abe?
What's he done?"... ...
"You wouldn't know
About my son?
Did he grow tall?
Did he have fun?
Did he learn to read?
Did he get to town?
Do you know his name?
Did he get on?"

- The North Spencer School Corporation, in Spencer County, Indiana, opened the Nancy Hanks Elementary School around 1990.
- In November 2008, the Mineral County Historical Society and the Mineral County Historic Landmarks Commission officially recognized the researched site of the birthplace of Nancy Hanks in Mineral County, West Virginia, which was first identified in 1929. They had a memorial placed at the site.
- On February 12, 2009, on the bicentennial of the birth of Abraham Lincoln, the West Virginia House of Delegates passed a resolution recognizing Nancy Hanks Lincoln for her contributions and her birth site in Mineral County.
- A rest area along Interstate 64 in Dale, Indiana is named for Nancy Hanks. In January 2019, the Indiana Department of Transportation announced plans to shut down the rest area because of low usage. As reported in February 2023, the Hanks rest stations were slated for east-bound closure and west-bound conversion to truck parking in fiscal year 2025.

== Other relatives ==
- Nancy Hanks is a second cousin five times removed of actor, producer, writer, and director Tom Hanks.
- Through his mother's Hanks bloodline, George Clooney is related to Nancy Hanks through Lucy Hanks Sparrow and Henry Sparrow's daughter, Mary Ann Sparrow, a half-sister to Nancy Hanks. Mary Ann Sparrow was Clooney's fourth great-grandmother.
- Camille Cosby, wife of Bill Cosby, was born Camille Olivia Hanks, and is a distant cousin of Nancy Hanks.

== Portrayals ==
The Hanks–Lincoln wedding was portrayed in a play called Dearly Beloved: The Vows of a Lincoln Legacy to kick off a three-year bicentennial celebration of Abraham Lincoln's life. The play was held at the Lincoln Homestead State Park in Springfield, Kentucky. Nancy is portrayed by Marianna Hill in the Daniel Boone episode "Before the Tall Man" and by Robin McLeavy in Abraham Lincoln: Vampire Hunter.

== See also ==
- Abraham Lincoln Birthplace National Historical Park
- Lincoln family tree
