= Little Pigeon River (Indiana) =

Coordinates: 38°0′35.15″N 87°33′1.06″W

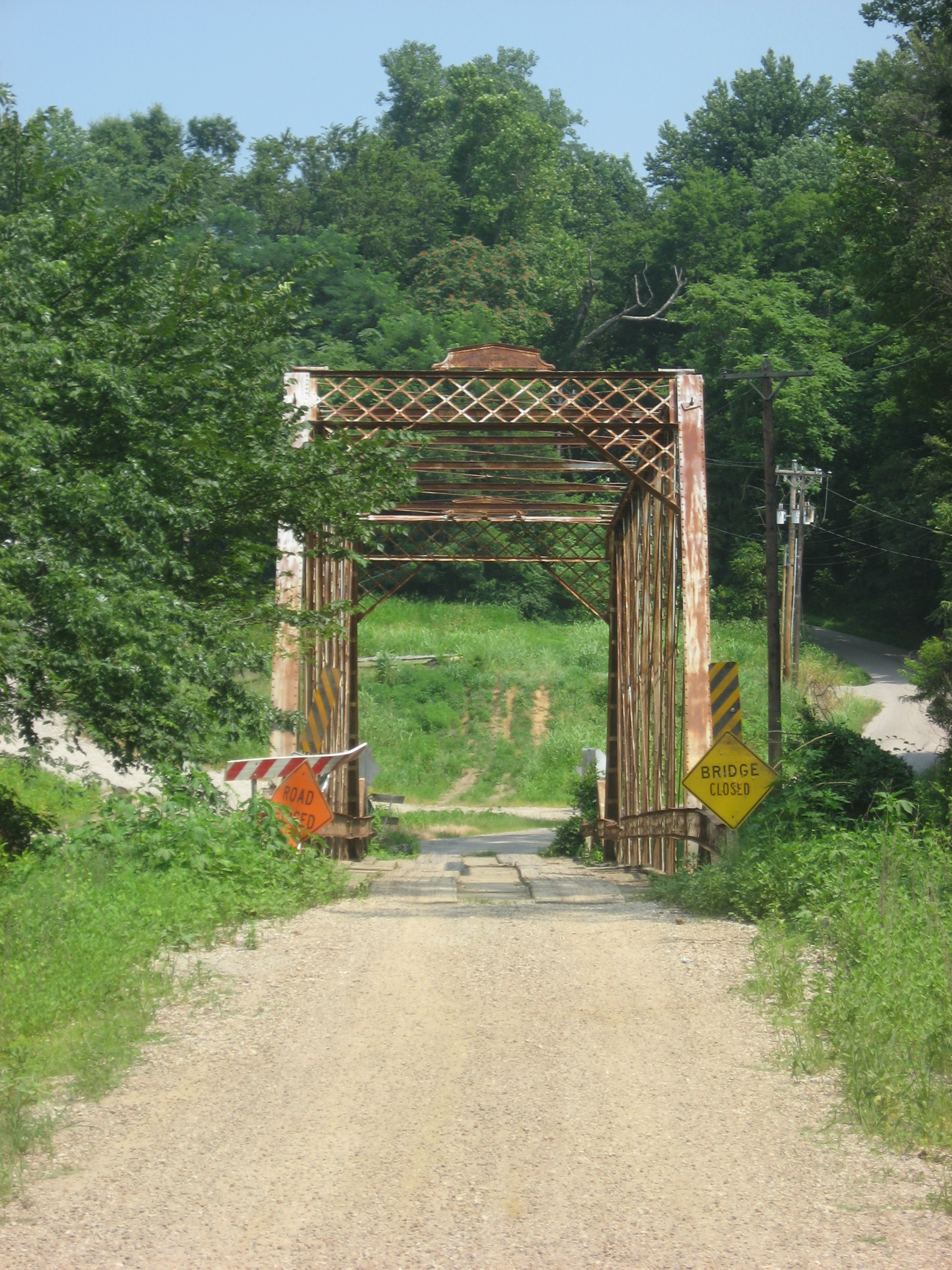
Bridge over the river near Yankeetown

Little Pigeon River or Little Pigeon Creek is a stream located in northwestern Spencer County and northeastern Warrick County, Indiana. The 1,000 acre watershed feeds marshland which, when the stream is high, provides a good habitat for ducks. It was the site of the Little Pigeon Creek Community, Abraham Lincoln's Indiana boyhood home, now the Lincoln Boyhood National Memorial.

Alternate names include:

- Little Pigeon
- North Fork Little Pigeon Creek
- Pigeon Branch

== See also ==
- List of rivers of Indiana
- Lincoln Boyhood National Memorial, part of the Little Pigeon Creek settlement
