= Lincoln City, Indiana =

- Unincorporated community
- Location within Indiana Location within the United States
- Coordinates: 38°07′16″N 86°59′55″W
- Country: United States
- State: Indiana
- County: Spencer
- Township: Carter
- Elevation: 433 ft (132 m)
- Time zone: UTC-6 (Central (CST))
  - Summer (DST): UTC-5 (CDT)
- ZIP code: 47552
- Area codes: 812, 930
- FIPS code: 18-43884
- GNIS feature ID: 437907

Lincoln City is an unincorporated community in Carter Township, Spencer County in the southwestern part of the U.S. state of Indiana. It lies five minutes south of Interstate 64, northeast of Evansville, and approximately twenty miles north of the Ohio River.

== History ==
Lincoln City was laid out in 1872 when the railroad was extended to that point. The community was named for the Lincoln family. Nearby is the Nancy Hanks Lincoln Memorial, as well as the site of the Lincoln log cabin, built in 1816. President Abraham Lincoln spent much of his childhood (from the ages of 7 to 21) on this farm, and as a young man he practiced law at the nearby Spencer County courthouse. Also located in Lincoln City is the Lincoln Boyhood National Memorial, a national park managed by the National Park Service that includes a Living Historical Farm that attempts to recreate the early nineteenth-century period during which the Lincoln family lived in the area. The living-history farm is a working pioneer-style homestead with a cabin, outbuildings, split rail fences, animals, gardens, and field crops. NPS interpreters in period clothing perform a variety of activities typical of the 1820s, and the farm's grounds are open year-round. The farm is staffed from mid-April through September full-time, and intermittently in October. The Lincoln Boyhood National Memorial is located on Highway 162 across from Lincoln State Park.

The Lincoln City post office has been in operation since 1892.

== Education ==
Heritage Hills High School is located in Lincoln City. It is one of two high schools in Spencer County.

== Notable people ==
- Jay Cutler - Chicago Bears quarterback; graduate of Heritage Hills High School
- Sarah Lincoln Grigsby - sister of Abraham Lincoln
- John Hanks - cousin of Abraham Lincoln
- Abraham Lincoln - 16th president of the United States of America
- Nancy Lincoln - mother of Abraham Lincoln
- Sarah Bush Lincoln - step-mother of Abraham Lincoln
- Thomas Lincoln - father of Abraham Lincoln
- Richard Fred Suhrheinrich - Judge on the United States Court of Appeals for the Sixth Circuit

== State Park ==
Lincoln State Park

== National Memorial ==
Lincoln Boyhood National Memorial
