= Lincoln State Park =

State park in Indiana, United States

- IUCN category III (natural monument or feature)
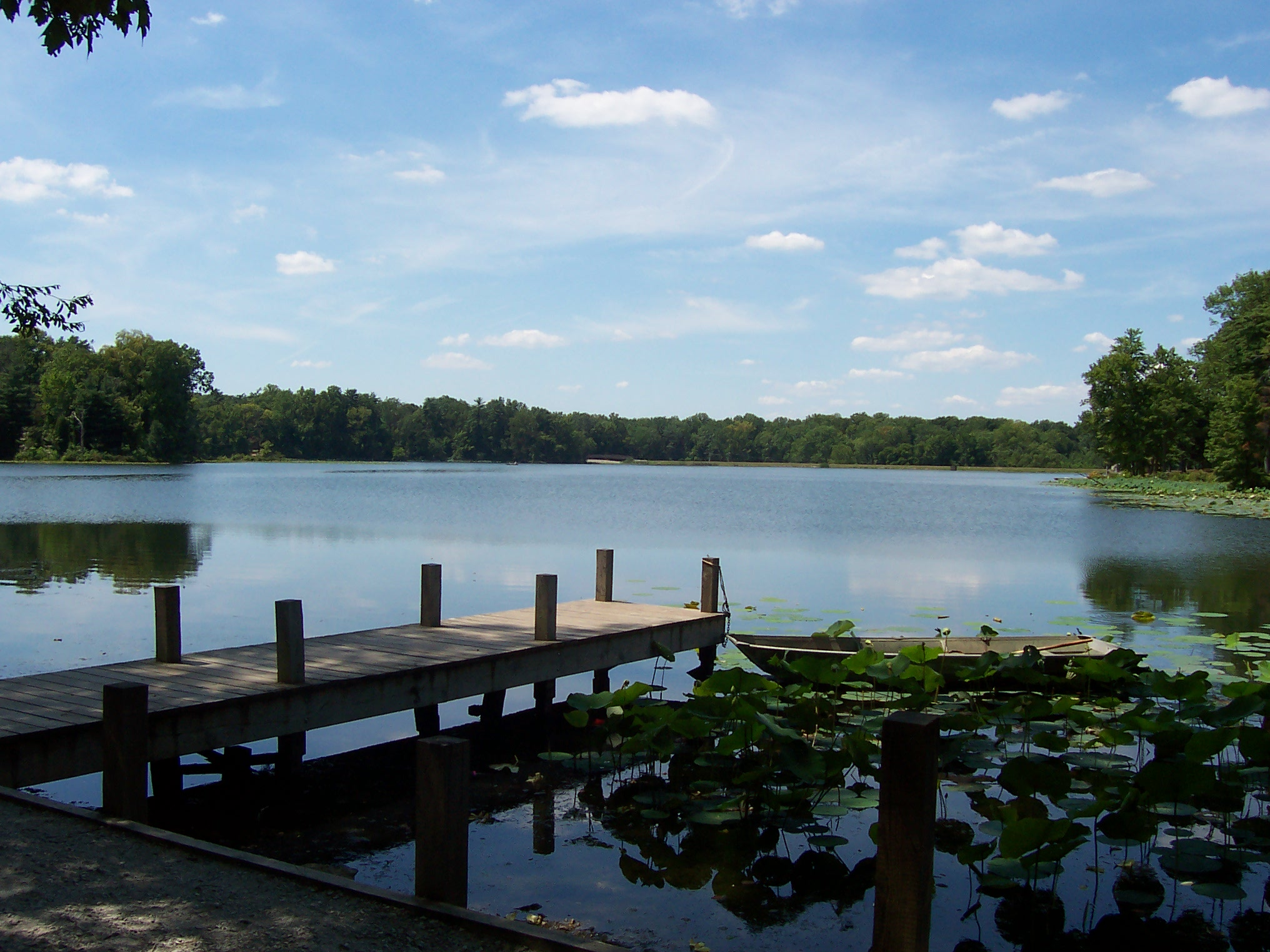
- Lake Lincoln in Lincoln State Park

- Location within Indiana Location within the United States
- Location: Spencer County, Indiana, United States
- Nearest city: Lincoln City, Indiana
- Coordinates: 38°06′15″N 86°59′47″W
- Area: 1,747 acres (7.07 km^{2})
- Established: 1932
- Visitors: 234,226 (in 2018–2019)
- Governing body: Indiana Department of Natural Resources

Lincoln State Park is a state park of Indiana, United States. It is located in southern Indiana in Spencer County approximately 35 miles (56 km) east of Evansville.

The park was established in 1932 and encompasses 1,747 acres (707 ha). There are 10 miles (16 km) of trails in the park. Many of the recreational facilities found within the park were constructed by the Civilian Conservation Corps during the Great Depression. In addition to the Sarah Lincoln Woods Nature Preserve, there are two lakes, campgrounds, group cottages, and cabins.

The park provides access to many sites important to Abraham Lincoln during his childhood, including the Little Pigeon Creek Baptist Church and Cemetery, where his sister Sarah Lincoln Grigsby is buried; and the home of Colonel Jones a Civil War officer and merchant who earlier employed Lincoln. Memorials were established to recognize Lincoln's mother Nancy Hanks Lincoln, whose gravesite is now contained within the adjacent Lincoln Boyhood National Memorial. There is also an interpretive center. The park receives about 235,000 visitors annually.

The park is 1 of 14 Indiana State Parks that were in the path of totality for the April 8, 2024 solar eclipse, with 2 minutes and 5 seconds of totality.

== Little Pigeon Baptist Church ==
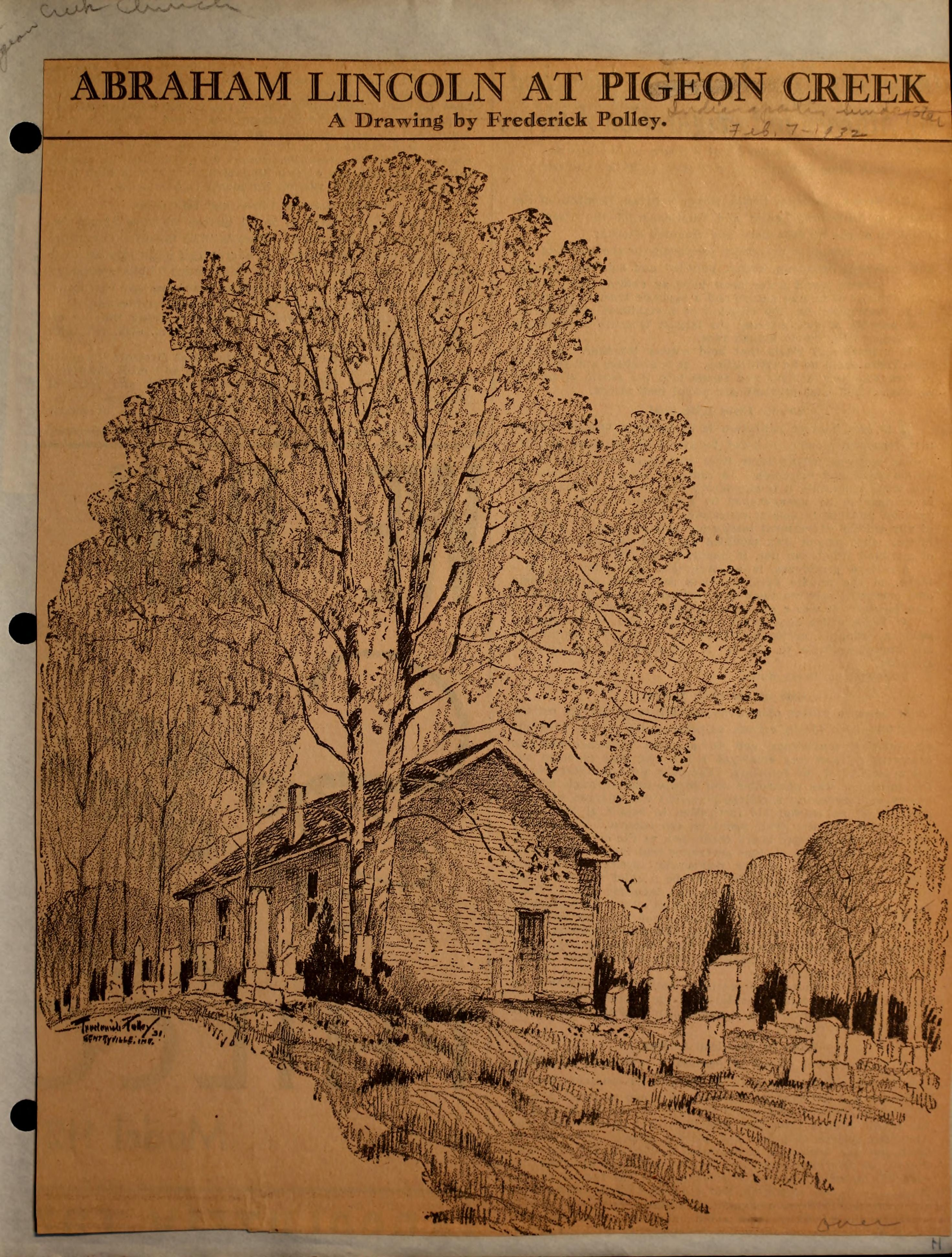
Little Pigeon Baptist Church

Noah Gordon donated the land, about a mile and a half from the Lincoln farm, for a church in 1820. In 1821, Abraham Lincoln's father, Thomas Lincoln, was asked to oversee the construction of the Little Pigeon Baptist Church. Abraham, at age twelve, helped his father build the church. Thomas also constructed the cabinets and pulpit inside the church. The church, like other churches in the West, would not likely have had a college-trained minister. It was a Primitive Baptist or "Hard Shell Baptist" church.

Thomas joined the church with his second wife, Sarah Bush Lincoln, on June 7, 1823, and five days later became a trustee. The church membership was generally limited to married adults. Thomas's daughter Sarah, for instance, was not made a member until 1826, shortly before her marriage. The Lincoln and Johnston children stayed at home when their parents went to church. Later, Abraham attended church. In 1825, the church decided to build a cemetery alongside the church. The church provided a means for a number of social gatherings for men and women.

It was called the Old Pigeon Church after several families, including the Grigsbys, split off from the church in 1840 and built a new Little Pigeon Baptist Church farther south. They split off from the old church due to differences of opinion about Sunday school and mission work.

The current structure is part of the state park and contains a cornerstone from the original church. Near the church is a small cemetery where the grave of Lincoln's sister, Sarah Lincoln Grigsby, is located. A congregation no longer worships there.

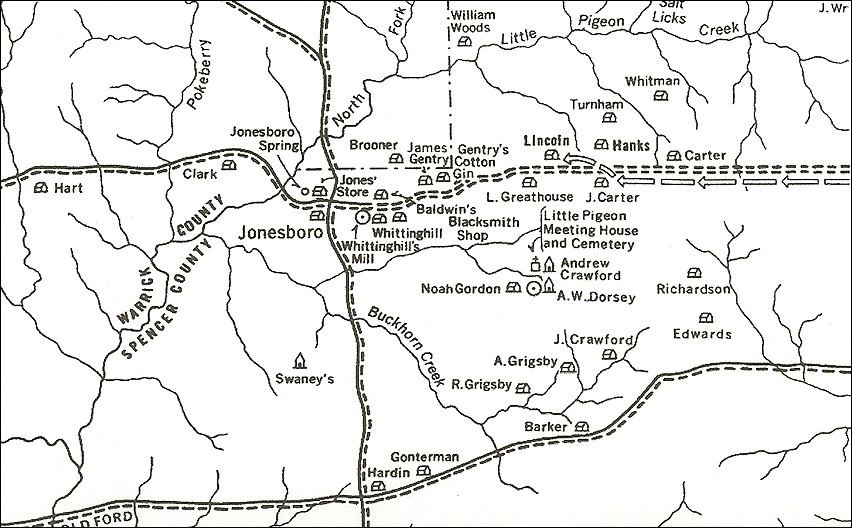
Little Pigeon Creek Community map

== Noah Gordon Mill site ==
Also within the park are the Noah Gordon home and mill sites. Noah Gordon was a neighbor of the Lincoln family and maintained a small grain mill. Abraham Lincoln spent many hours waiting his turn to mill grain here. Nine-year-old Abraham Lincoln was knocked unconscious for several hours after he was kicked in the head by a horse milling grain at Gordon's mill.

== James Gentry Home site ==
Young Abraham Lincoln worked for James Gentry at his general store. The home site of James Gentry is located within Lincoln State Park off of trail 3. Abraham Lincoln took a flatboat trip to New Orleans, leaving from Rockport, to sell goods for Gentry. It was on this trip to New Orleans that Lincoln first witnessed slavery.

== Col. William Jones Home ==
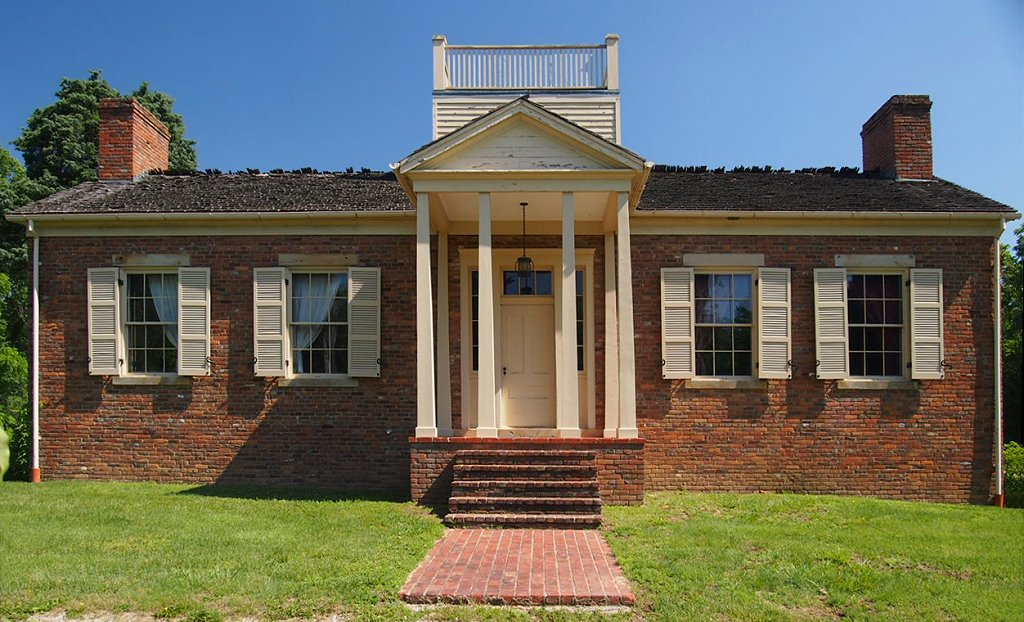
The Colonel William Jones House

The park also includes the restored Colonel William Jones House near Gentryville. Col. Jones was a merchant, farmer, politician, and Union Colonel during the American Civil War. The home was built around 1834 and the farm contained a general store where Abraham Lincoln was also employed. Born in Vincennes in 1803, Jones settled in Spencer County in 1828. Jones and his wife, Rachel, raised five sons on this farm. The home is open for tours, including a restored log barn. The home is located 1/4 mile west of Gentryville on Boone Street.

== Lincoln Amphitheatre ==
Within Lincoln State Park is the Lincoln Amphitheatre, a modern covered outdoor amphitheater that was constructed in 1987 and began producing Young Abe Lincoln (written by Billy Edd Wheeler), that year. After being closed in 2005, Lincoln: Upon The Altar of Freedom premiered in June 2009 for the bicentennial of Lincoln's birth. The play returned for a second year in June 2010 and introduced the new "Concert in the Park" which features cast members singing some of the most popular songs and hymns during Lincoln's life following each nightly performance. In 2011 Lincoln: Upon The Altar of Freedom was rewritten into a musical renamed A. Lincoln: A Pioneer Tale. It recounts both Lincoln's childhood and major events in his presidency. It opened on June 8, 2012. It played its third season in 2014. A Pioneer Tale and The Lincoln Amphitheater went dark in 2015 for changes in management. In the 2016 season, The Indiana Department of Tourism operated the amphitheater. A Pioneer Tale would play its 4th season that same year with many concerts taking place during the 2016 season. In 2017, The Actor's Community Theater of Jasper remounted a 30th-anniversary production of Young Abe Lincoln as part of the 2017 season. It was performed again in 2018 as an "Encore" Production. In 2019, Here I Grew Up, a brand new Lincoln Drama premiered at the Lincoln Amphitheatre. The show had a book written by Jasmine Bosler, Kyle Rupert, Molly Rupert, Dean Dorrell, Heath Kluemper and Tyler Smith, with music written by Jason Kleiman.

== Lincoln Interpretive Center ==
Seasonal programs are offered at the Lincoln Interpretive Center, the park's nature center, which also features natural history exhibits.

== See also ==
- Lincoln Boyhood National Memorial
