= Lincoln Boyhood National Memorial =

United States historic place in Spencer County, Indiana

- U.S. National Register of Historic Places
- U.S. National Historic Landmark District
- U.S. National Memorial
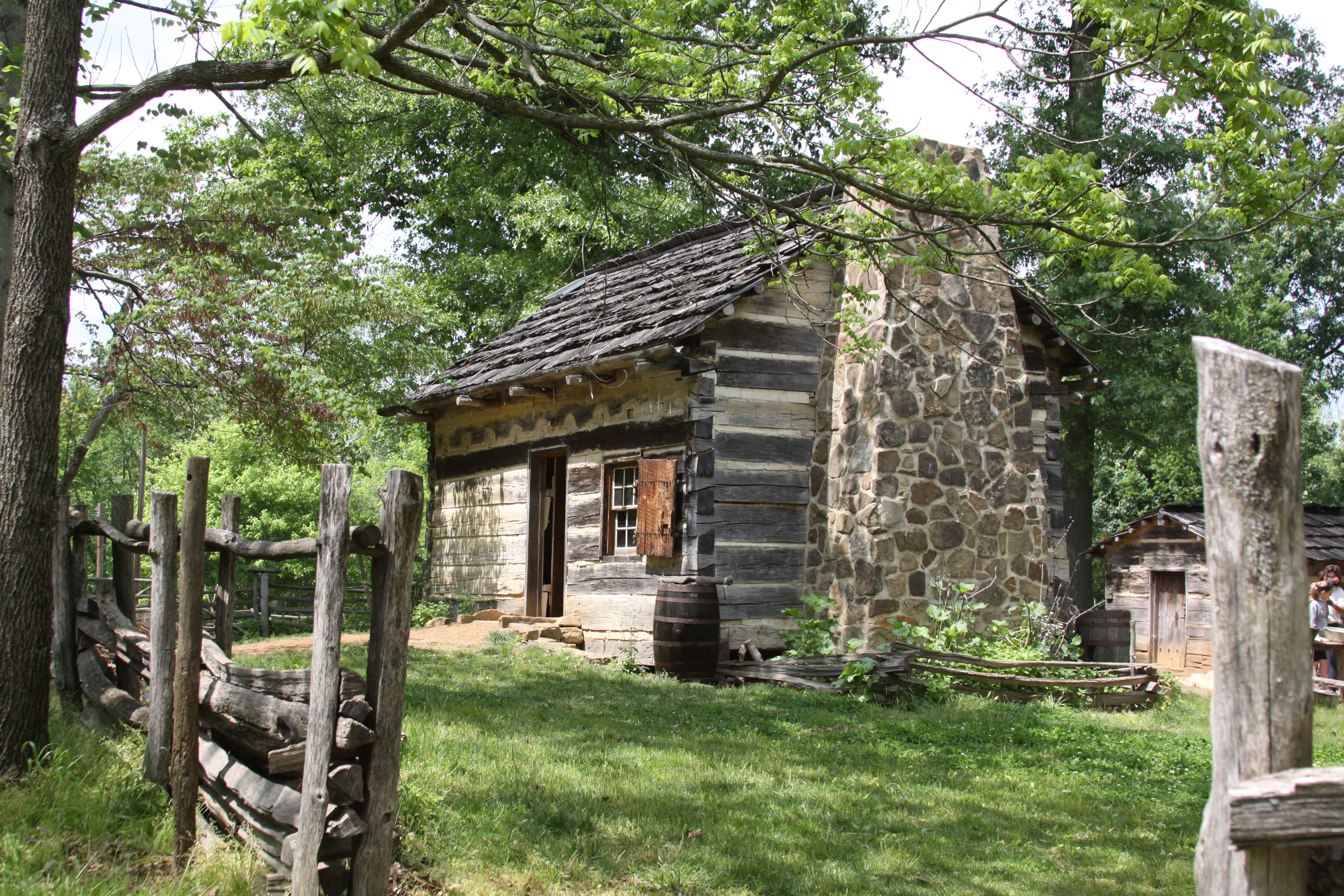
- Lincoln Farm (replica)

- Location within Indiana Location within the United States
- Location: IN 162, Lincoln City, Indiana, United States
- Coordinates: 38°7′6″N 86°59′49″W
- Area: 200 acres (81 ha)
- Built: 1816
- Architects: Bishop, Richard E.; Olmsted, Frederick Law
- Visitation: 115,517 (2025)
- Website: Lincoln Boyhood National Memorial
- NRHP reference No.: 66000012

Significant dates
- Added to NRHP: October 15, 1966
- Designated NHLD: December 19, 1960
- Designated NMEM: February 19, 1962

Lincoln Boyhood National Memorial is a United States presidential memorial and a National Historic Landmark District in Lincoln City, Indiana. It preserves the farm site where Abraham Lincoln lived with his family from 1816 to 1830. During that time, he grew from a 7-year-old boy to a 21-year-old man. His mother, Nancy Hanks Lincoln (d.1818), and at least 27 other settlers were buried here in the Pioneer Cemetery. His sister Sarah Lincoln Grigsby (d.1827) was buried in the nearby Little Pigeon Baptist Church cemetery, now across the highway at Lincoln State Park.

Included in the park is the Lincoln Living Historical Farm, an open-air museum and a large memorial with scenes from Lincoln's life depicted in sculptural reliefs completed in the 1940s. The Lincoln Boyhood Home was named a National Historic Landmark in 1960. In 2005 the site was visited by 147,443 people. On site is a visitor center, featuring a 15-minute orientation film about Lincoln's time in Indiana, and museum and memorial halls. The site is located about ten minutes off the Interstate 64 / U.S. 231 junction and near the new U.S. 231 Route, named the Abraham Lincoln Memorial Parkway in his honor.

== Memorial features ==
=== Memorial building ===
The centerpiece of the memorial is a one-story limestone ashlar memorial building completed in 1945 that features five sculpted panels portraying different phases of Lincoln's life. It has a small theater featuring a 16-minute film about Lincoln's life in Indiana. The museum features several exhibits and artifacts related to Lincoln's life, which are located in an adjoining hall. A private gallery displays Lincoln-related artwork, including numerous portraits and lithographs of Lincoln and his family. The park holds an oil portrait of Nancy Hanks Lincoln, done by an artist long after her death. A chapel and meeting hall can be rented for public weddings and other gatherings.

=== Historical farm ===
Nearby is the site of the original Lincoln cabin; the sandstone foundation clearly outlines the boundary of the house and is visible to visitors. Discovered through a professional archaeological excavation, it is now preserved and protected by a wall. A very short distance from the original cabin site stands the replica farm house. Park rangers in full period clothing work the 1820s-style farm, making it a living history site. Visitors can talk with them, take classes and learn more about the many activities and items at the farm. The Living Historical Farm is open seasonally, from mid-spring to early fall; it cultivates crops, raises livestock, and uses and displays historic farm implements.

== History ==
=== Lincoln in Indiana ===
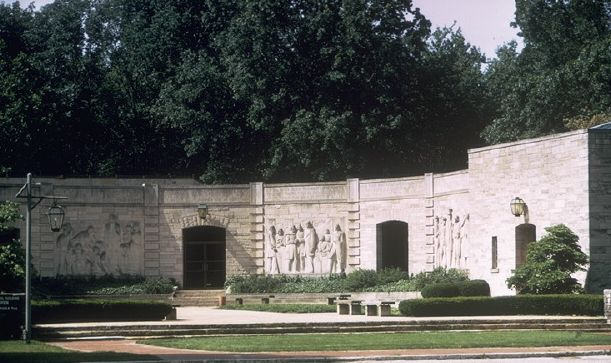
Memorial Building

Abraham's father Thomas Lincoln had lost two previous homes in Kentucky, one at the Sinking Spring Farm where Lincoln was born, in part through problems with land titles. Because Kentucky had not had proper land surveys in its early years, many residents were forced off their farms after surveys were completed and land titles were challenged. The Lincolns were one such family: after Thomas had built some economic and social success in Kentucky, he lost everything. In 1815 he went to Indiana to locate a new homestead for his family. He wanted to live in a free state rather than compete with farmers who used slave labor.

The family took two weeks in 1816 to move to Spencer County (then Perry County) in southern Indiana, settling at the Little Pigeon Creek Community. Lincoln was a talented carpenter who owned better carpentry tools than the average settler. He could build cabins in as little as four days, and was able to have their new home built before the winter began. The next year he built up the homestead, cleared land of trees and rocks before plowing, and planted crops. In early September 1818, some residents started coming down with milk sickness. It was caused by the settlers' consuming dairy products or meat of cows that ate the white snakeroot plant, which had the toxin temetrol. Cows often roamed in woods and underbrush, where the white snakeroot grew. Most of those in Little Pigeon Creek with milk sickness became deathly ill, including Abraham's mother, Nancy Hanks Lincoln. She succumbed and died on October 5, 1818. She was buried in a gravesite behind the family cabin next to the Lincolns' closest neighbor, Nancy Rusher Brooner. Brooner had also been ill with milk sickness, was nursed by Nancy Lincoln, and died two weeks before on September 18. Nancy's maternal aunt and uncle, Elizabeth and Thomas Sparrow, with whom she had grown up, also died of the illness and were buried nearby, at what became known as Pioneer Cemetery. A minister could not reach the frontier settlement until the following spring, when he conducted a funeral service for all of the dead.

Following his mother's death, young Abraham Lincoln continued to work on the farm and was cared for by his older sister Sarah. In 1819 their father married Sarah Bush Johnston, a widow of Elizabethtown, Kentucky whom he had known from the years there. She had three children, all of whom came with her to share the Lincoln cabin. Abraham shared the cabin's loft with his step brother John Johnston and his cousin Dennis Hanks for the rest of his time in Indiana. Sarah treated the Lincoln children as her own, and Abraham grew especially close to her. Early on, the Lincoln family had joined the nearby Little Pigeon Creek Primitive Baptist Church, where Thomas served as a trustee and Abraham briefly as a sexton. The church is preserved in the Lincoln State Park.

In November 1819, the area's first school was opened by Andrew Crawford, and at age 10, Abraham attended a school for the first time, at a cost of two dollars per year. He was a student there for two school years, which were three-month intervals held during the winter months when the children were not needed for farming. In 1822 the Lincolns enrolled the boy in a new school taught by James Swaney. As it was more than 4 miles (6.4 km) away and Abraham had to walk there, his attendance was poor. In 1824 he was transferred to another school closer to home, which he attended until age 16, when he ended formal schooling. In January 1826, Abraham's only sister Sarah died during the birth of her first child, who was stillborn. She was buried in the Little Pigeon Creek Primitive Baptist Church cemetery.

As he grew, Abraham began taking outside jobs, often working for twenty-five cents a day clearing land, plowing fields, and building fences. When he was not working, he spent a great deal of time at the James Gentry General Store and the two nearby grain mills in the small town, where he liked to tell stories and listen to those of older men. He also read widely and borrowed books from anyone who would lend them. During his several trips into the county seat of Rockport, Abraham became acquainted with the lawyers John Pitcher and John Breckenridge, who inspired his interest in the law. Later he followed that profession. During this period, he made his first trip with the businessman Allen Gentry by flatboat down to New Orleans to sell produce and bring home supplies. He earned eight dollars from the trip. It is traditionally believed that this was when he first saw a slave market. From his experiences and the influences of the anti-slavery men in Indiana and locally, Abraham began to form his opinions against slavery. After fourteen years in southern Indiana, in March 1830, Thomas Lincoln moved his family to Central Illinois.

=== Making the memorial ===
The site attracted little attention as a link to Lincoln's past until 1879, during a period of increased activity in the North and the South of memorializing following the American Civil War. When researchers located the grave of Nancy Hanks, Peter Evans Studebaker (of the South Bend, Indiana Studebaker Brothers Manufacturing Company) arranged for a headstone to be placed at the site. For decades, local groups tried to gain recognition for the site as one of historical importance. In 1917 they located the foundation of the cabin and officially marked it on April 28.

In 1927 the Indiana Lincoln Union was formed to raise funds and encourage support for a memorial to recognize Lincoln's years in the Hoosier state. In 1932 the state established the adjacent Lincoln State Park to protect the area and preserve the historic homestead site. The state transferred part of that area to the memorial district, including the grave site of Nancy Lincoln (and what was found to be 29 other graves), now included in what is called Pioneer Cemetery. The Union continued to raise funds to make improvements to the site in the 1930s and 1940s, during the Great Depression and World War II. It completed construction of the Memorial building in 1944. It has five bas-relief panels portraying different periods of Lincoln's life, designed by sculptor Elmer Daniels.

In the 1930s the Civilian Conservation Corps (CCC) helped mold much of the memorial's surrounding landscape, including an iconic grass alleyway leading from the memorial center to the pioneer cemetery. In 1934, a CCC crew located and excavated the original hearthstones of the Lincoln family farm. These workers also helped plant more than 22,000 native trees to restore that part of the county to something similar to the wilderness a young Abraham Lincoln would have seen when his family first came to Indiana. Today, high school students continue helping maintain and improve the national park through the Youth Conservation Corps.

In 1962 the Indiana legislature approved donating another 114 acres (46 ha) to the district and the Lincoln Boyhood National Memorial was created. The U.S. Congress authorized the national memorial on February 19, 1962, placing it under the National Park Service. The memorial district was listed on the National Register of Historic Places, on October 15, 1966. In 1968 the NPS created the Living Historical Farm after "meticulous research" about the period, to help visitors better understand the lives of Lincoln, his family and neighbors during the frontier years in the area.

== Gallery ==
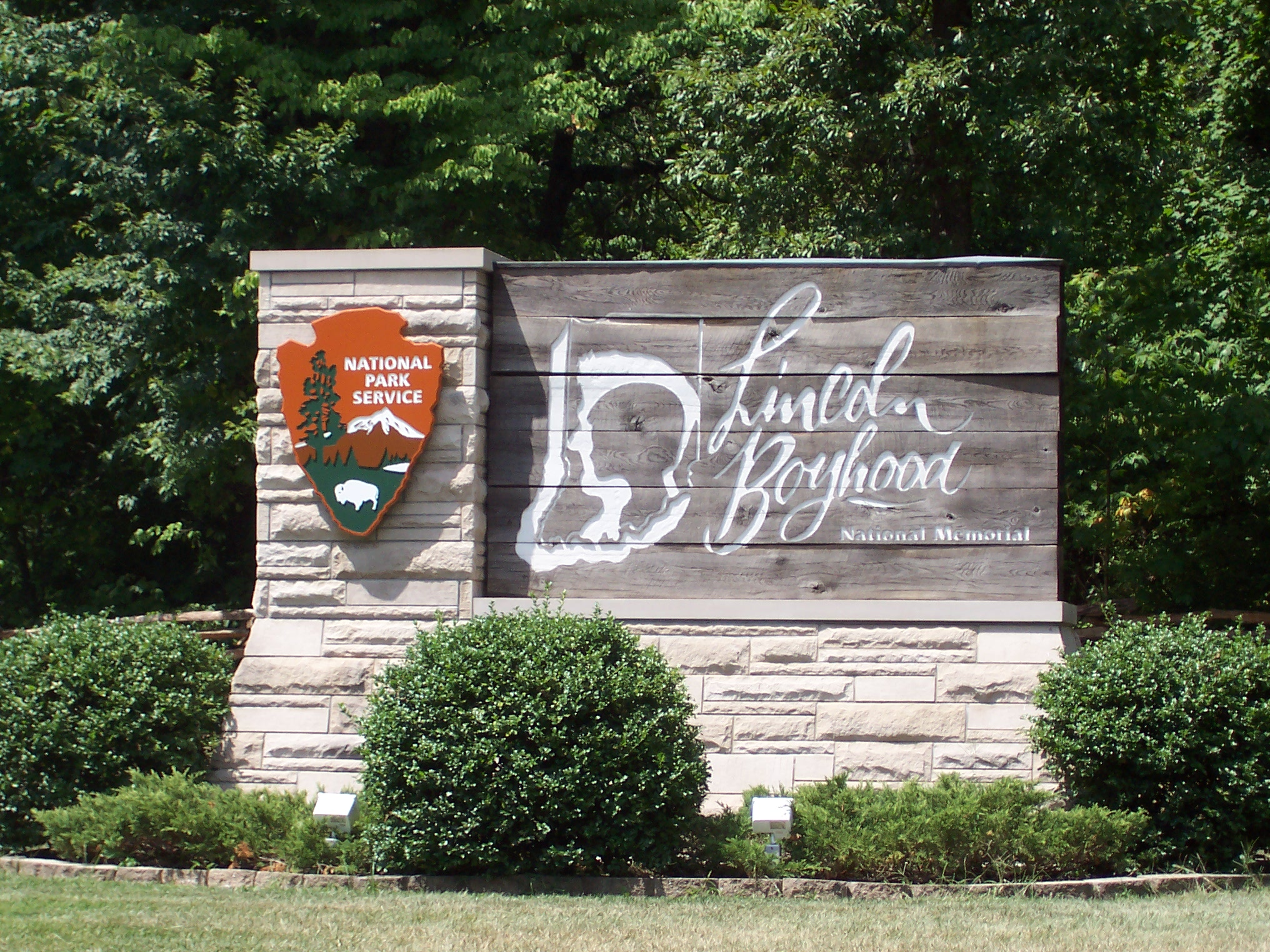
Memorial entrance

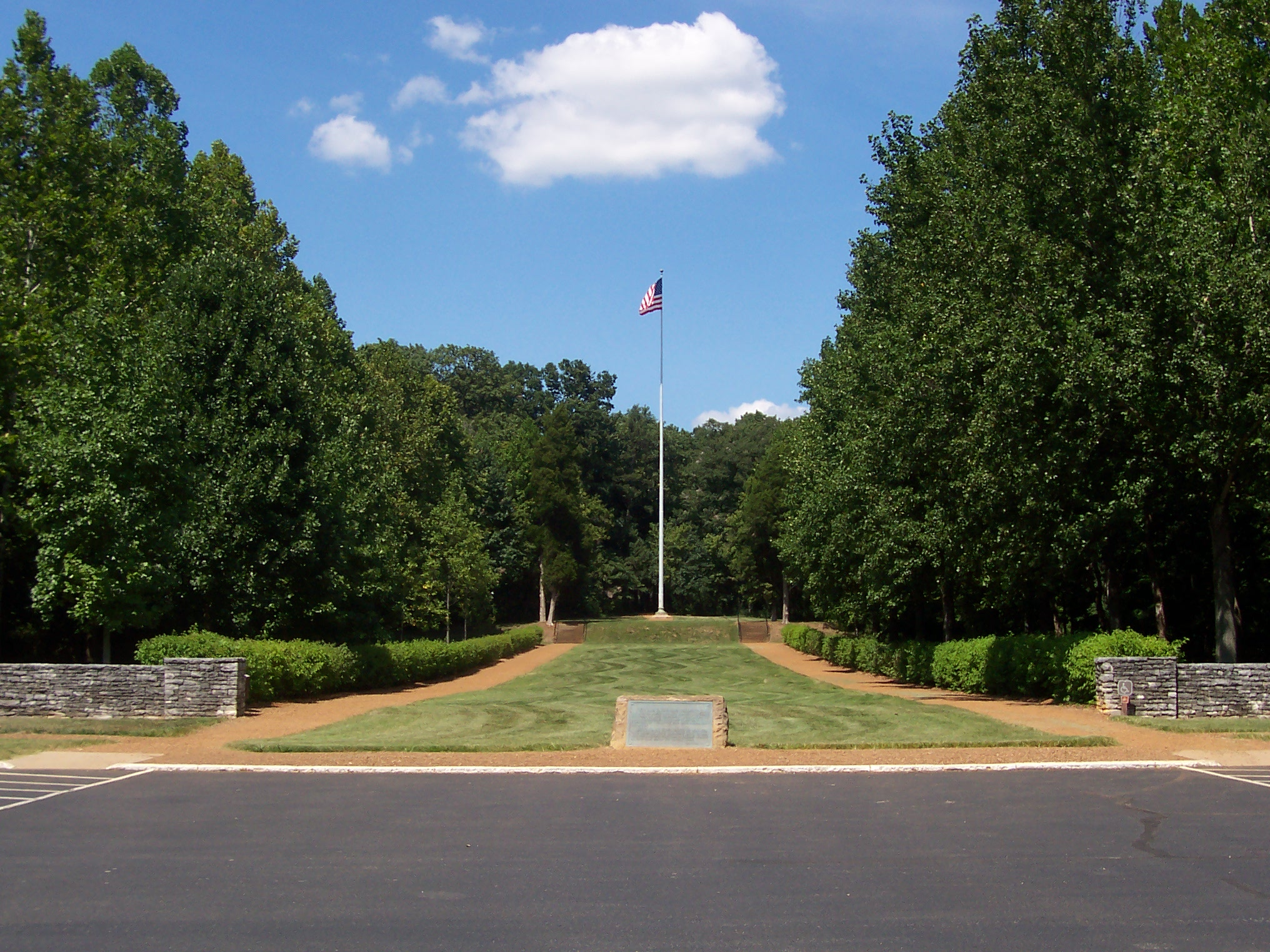
Memorial courtyard

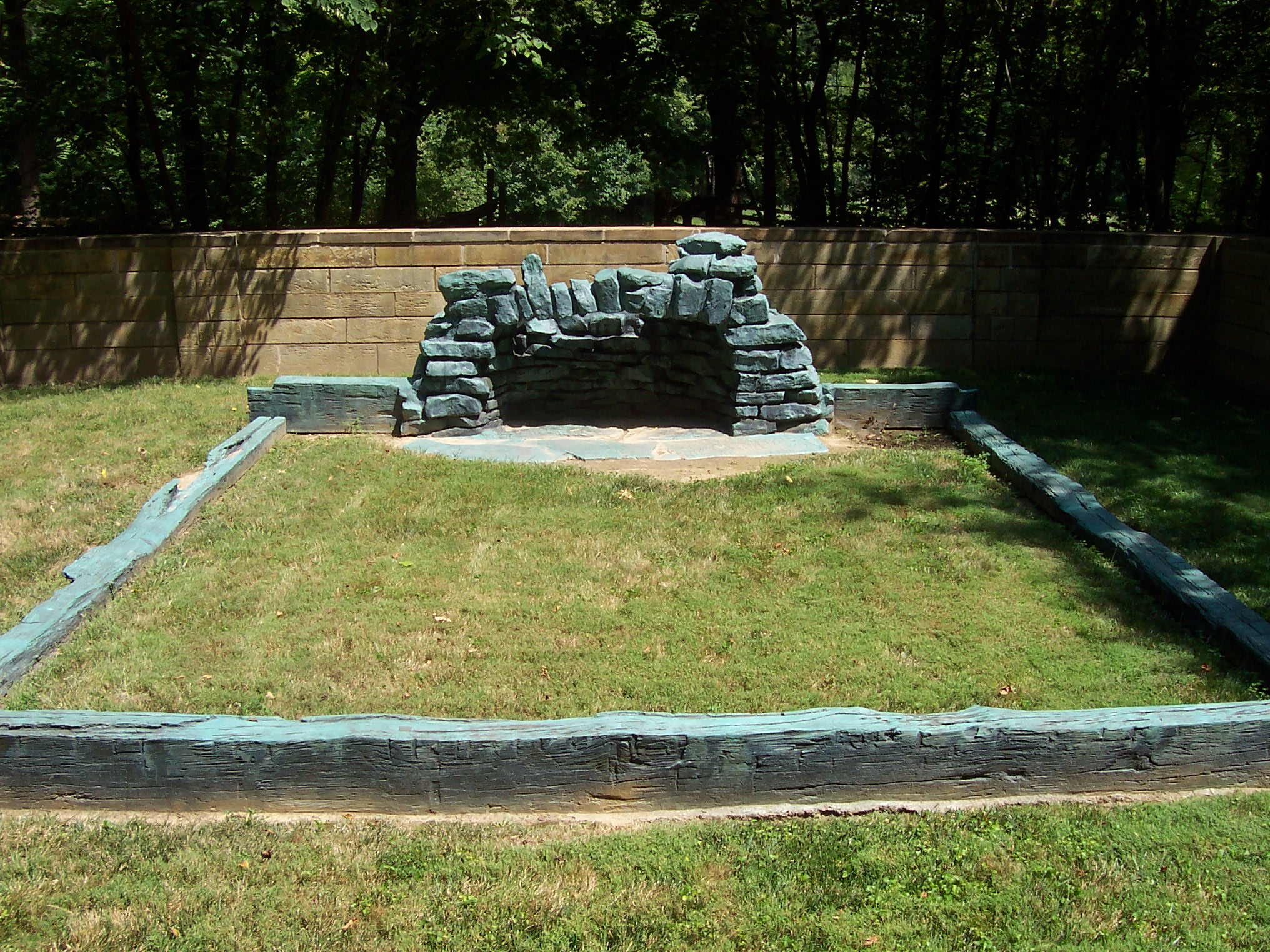
The foundation of the Lincolns' cabin

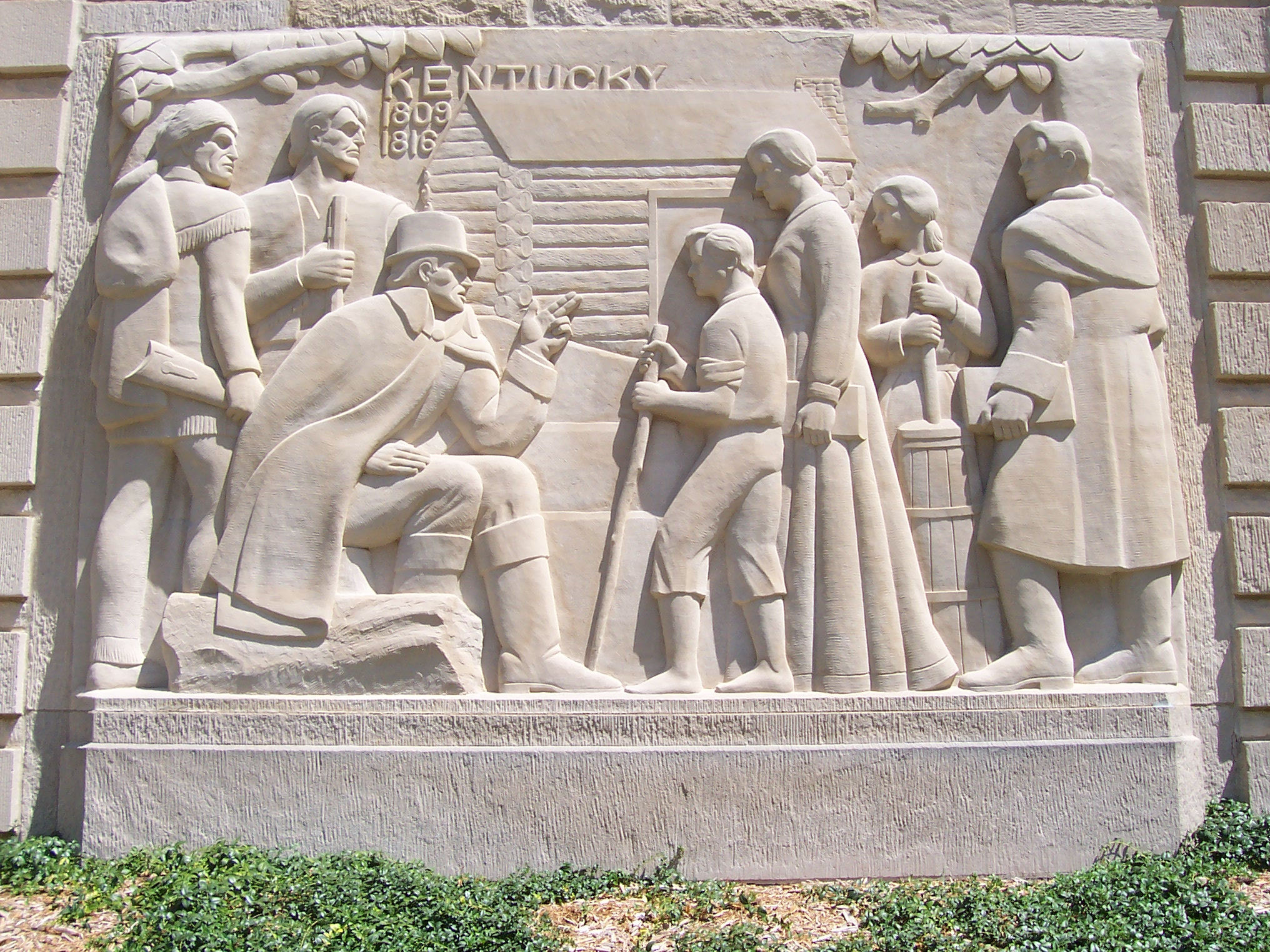
Lincoln in Kentucky

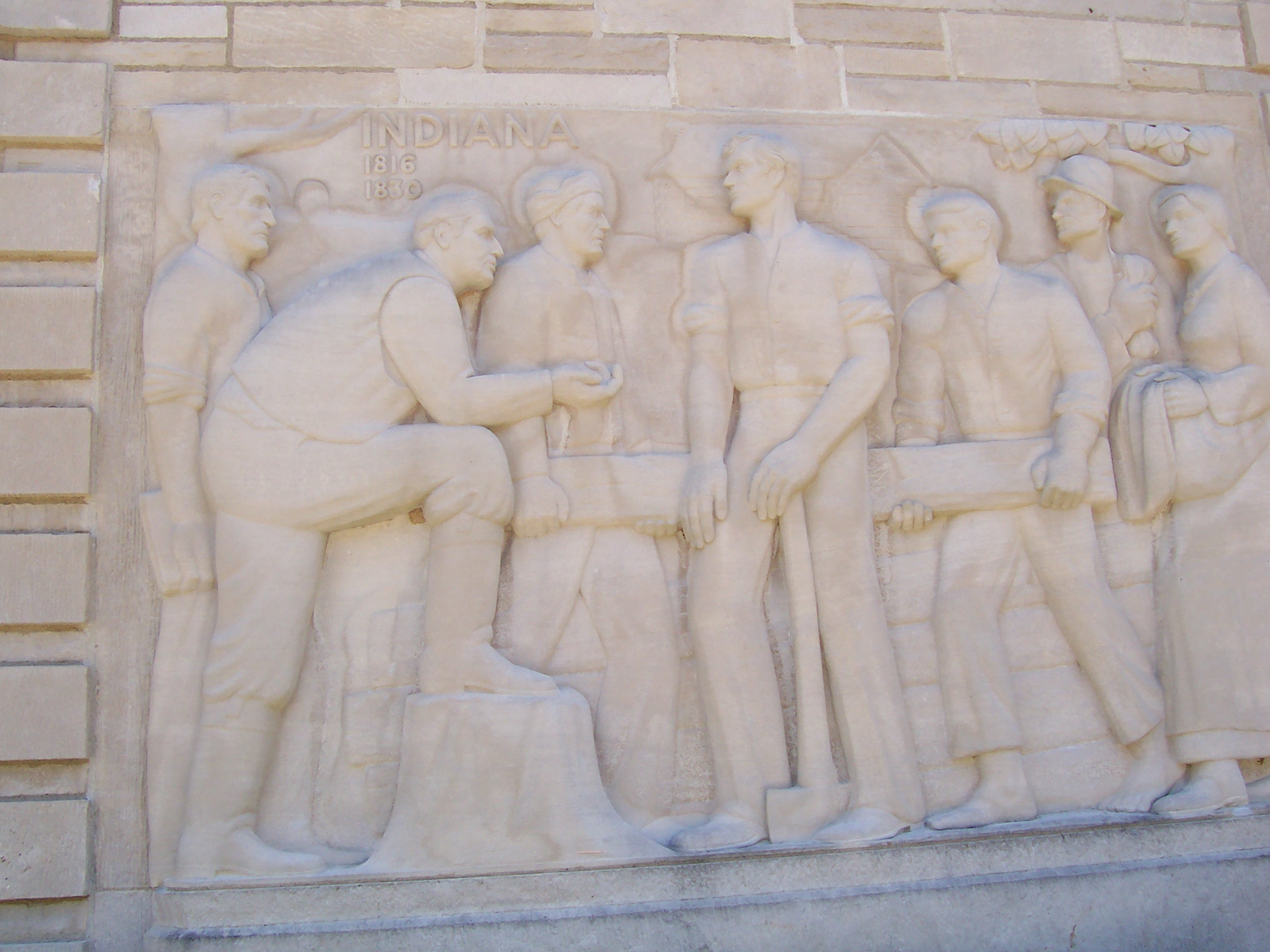
Lincoln in Indiana

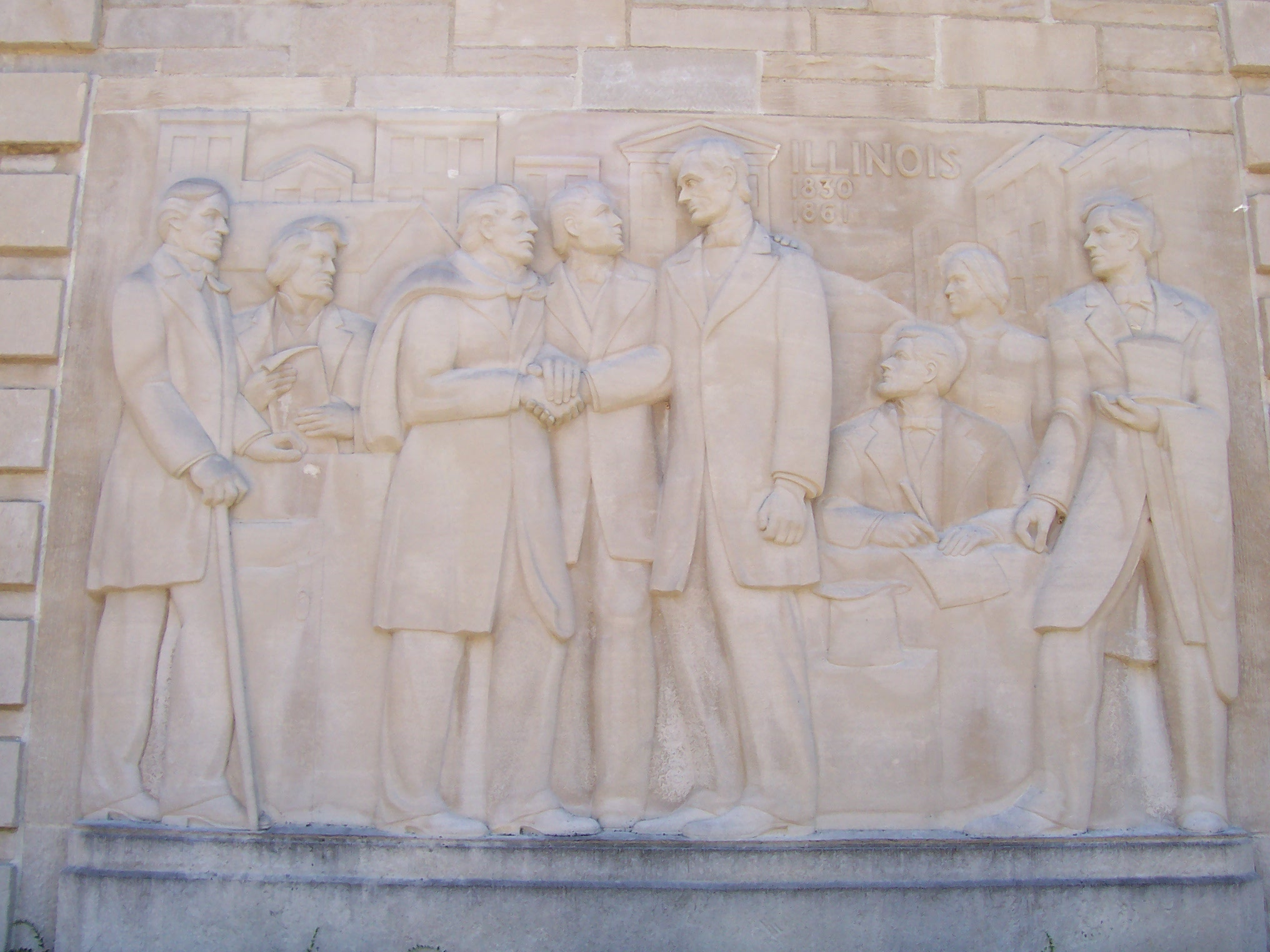
Lincoln in Illinois

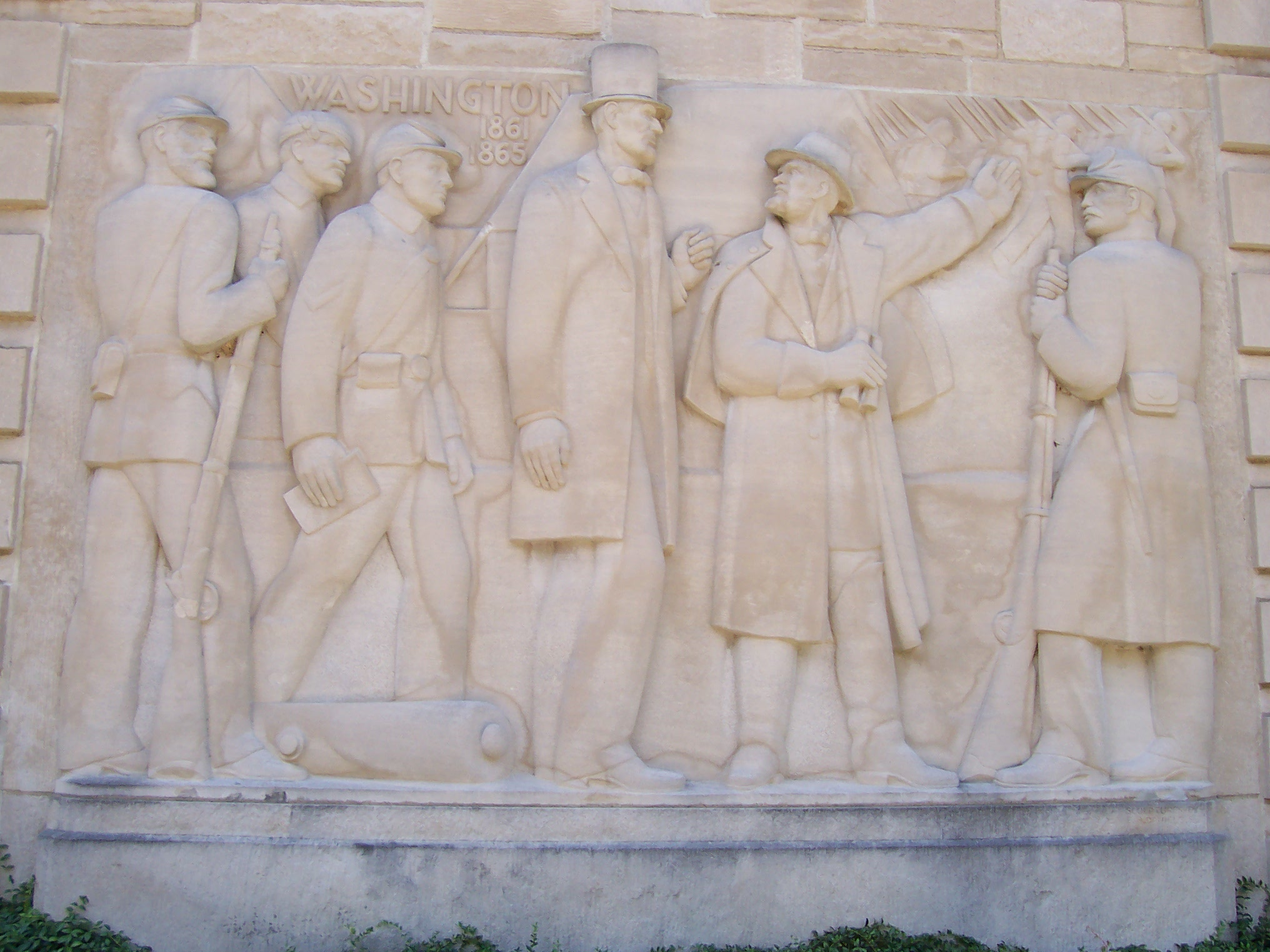
Lincoln in Washington D.C.

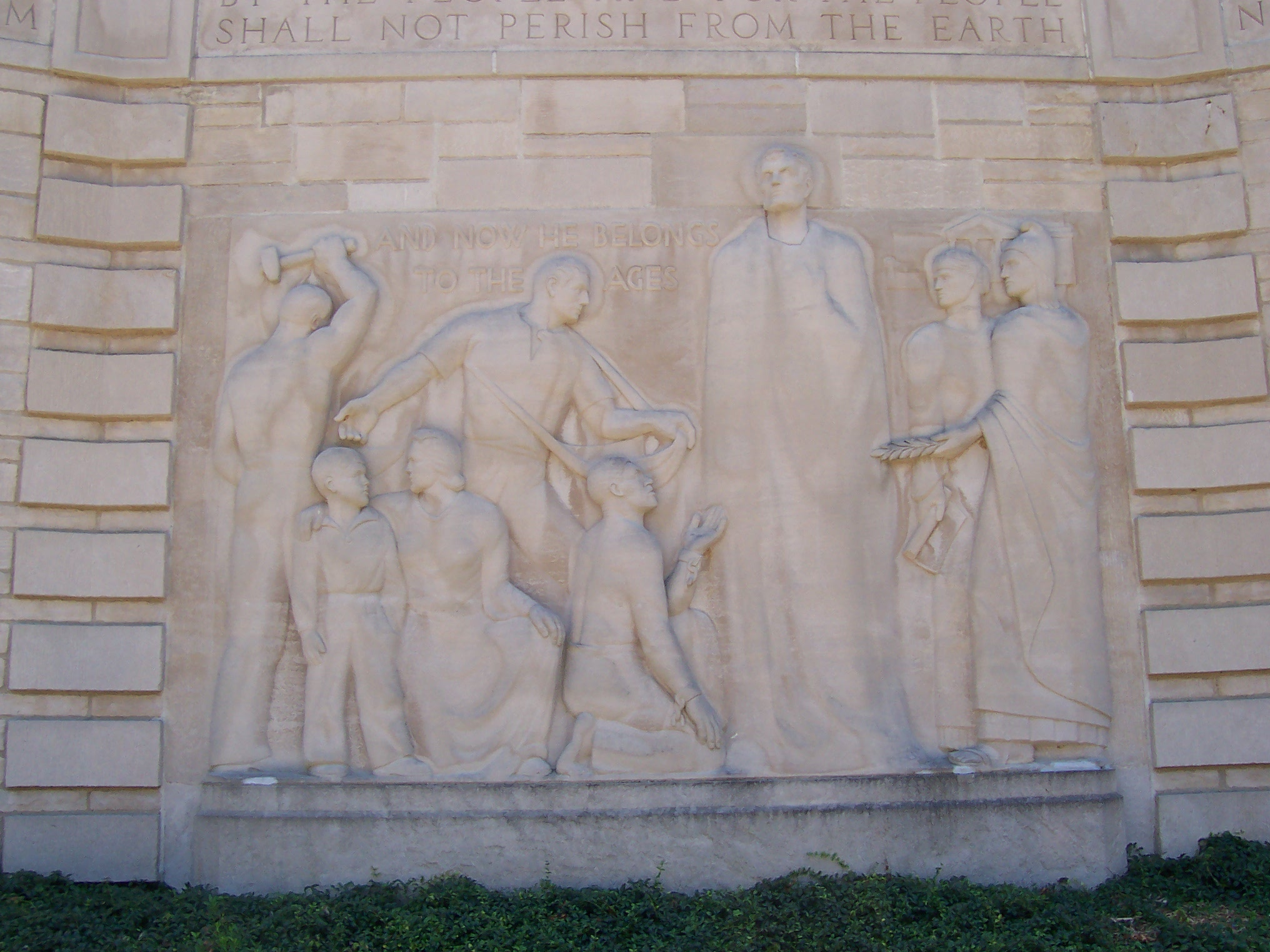
Lincoln's legacy

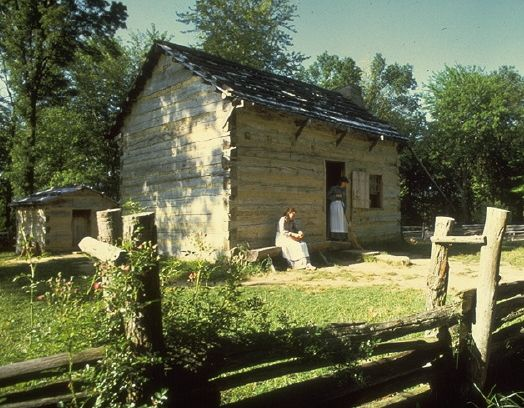
Cabin at the Living Historical Farm

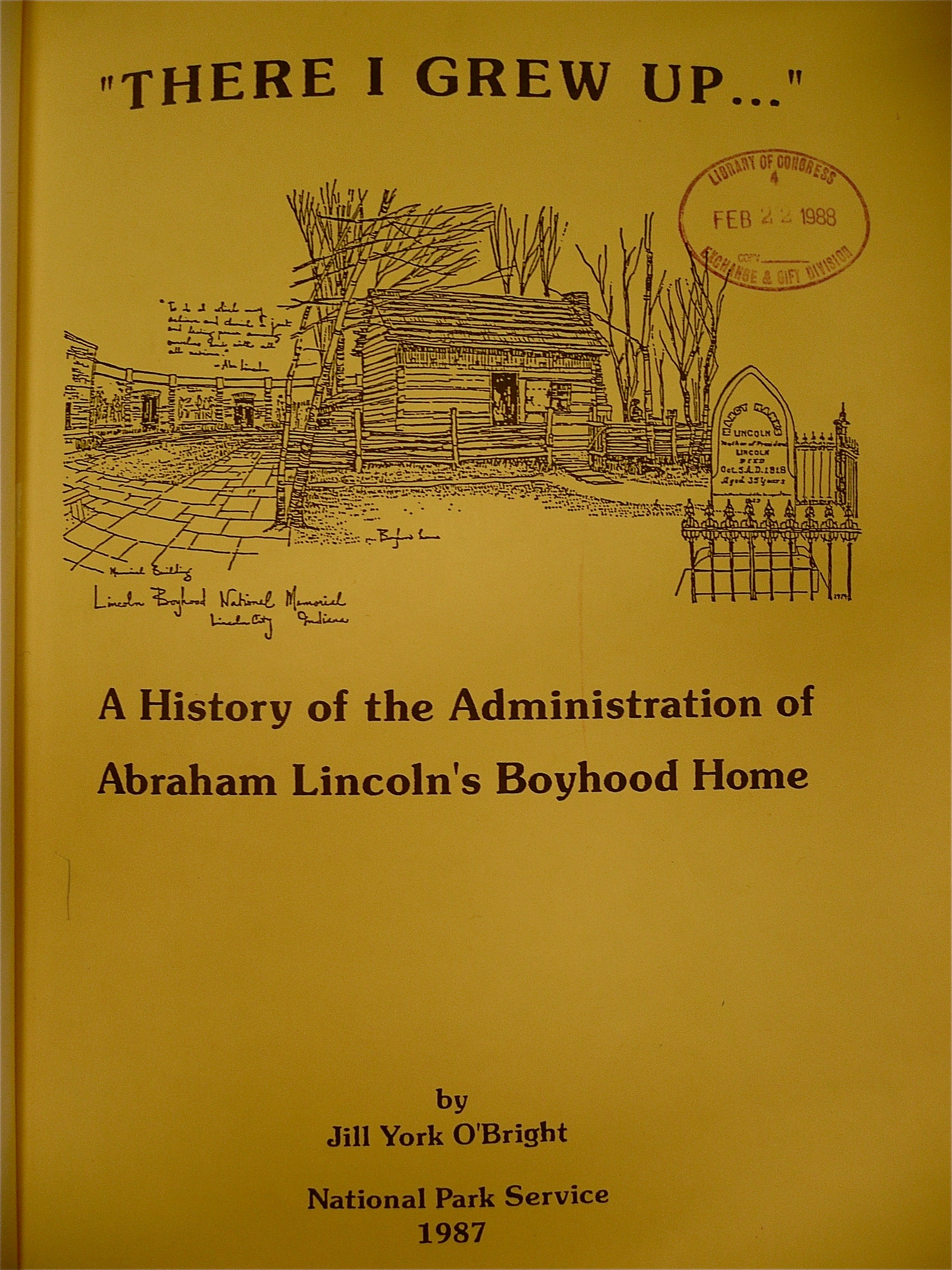
"There I Grew Up...," A History of Abraham Lincoln's Boyhood Home

== See also ==
- Lincoln's Tomb
- Lincoln Memorial
- List of museums in Indiana
- List of national memorials of the United States
- List of residences of presidents of the United States
- Presidential memorials in the United States
- List of National Historic Landmarks in Indiana
- National Register of Historic Places listings in Spencer County, Indiana

== Sources ==
- Arbogast, David (March 1976). Lincoln Boyhood National Memorial NRHP Nomination Form. National Park Service.
- The National Parks: Index 2001–2003. Washington: U.S. Department of the Interior.
- Funk, Arville L (1983) [1969]. A Sketchbook of Indiana History. Rochester, Indiana: Christian Book Press.
- O'Bright, Jill York (1987). "There I Grew Up...," a History of the Administration of Abraham Lincoln's Boyhood Home. National Park Service.
