= Sarah Bush Lincoln =

Stepmother of Abraham Lincoln (1788–1869)

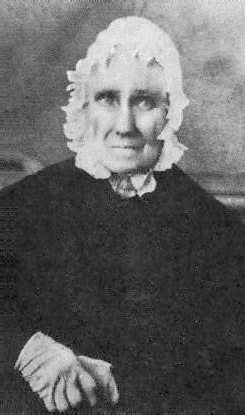
- Born: Sarah Bush; December 13, 1788; Elizabethtown, Kentucky
- Died: April 12, 1869 (aged 80); Coles County, Illinois
- Resting place: Shiloh Cemetery, Lerna, Illinois
- Known for: stepmother of Abraham Lincoln
- Spouse(s): Daniel Johnston; Thomas Lincoln
- Children: 3

Sarah Bush Lincoln (née Bush; formerly Johnston; December 13, 1788 – April 12, 1869) was the second wife of Thomas Lincoln and stepmother of Abraham Lincoln. She was born in Kentucky to Christopher and Hannah Bush. Lincoln married her first husband, Daniel Johnston, in 1806, and they had three children. Daniel died in 1816, and she married widower Thomas Lincoln three years later, joining his family with her three children.

== Early life ==
Sarah Bush was born December 13, 1788, in Hardin County, Kentucky, the third daughter to Hannah Davis (1745–1835) and Christopher Bush (1735–1813). Christopher, a settler of Dutch ancestry, was a financially well-off slave patrol captain. Described as "a stirring, industrious man," he owned more than two thousand acres of Kentucky land. The Bushes moved with their nine children to Elizabethtown, Kentucky, when Sarah was two years old. As a child, Sarah prided herself on her appearance and keeping up with the latest fashion. She had blue-gray eyes and was light complexioned. Sarah has been described as proud, energetic, hard working, neat, and possessing good sense.

Her brother Isaac (1779–1827) sold Thomas Lincoln the Sinking Stream Farm.

== Marriage and family ==
=== Daniel Johnston ===
Sarah Bush married Daniel Johnston (1782–1816) on March 13, 1806. They had three children: John, Elizabeth, and Matilda.

The Johnstons struggled financially throughout their marriage, having little or no taxable property and debts that Daniel's brothers sometimes settled. In 1814, Daniel obtained the position of county jailer, which included living quarters for the family within the jailhouse. Sarah became the cook and cleaner for the jail. In addition, the couple performed cleaning services for the courthouse. In 1816, Daniel died of cholera during an epidemic. Thereafter, Sarah seems to have recovered financially somewhat; she purchased a cabin that had previously been owned by Samuel Haycraft, furnished it with luxurious furnishings, and sent one of her daughters to a private school.

=== Thomas Lincoln ===
==== Indiana ====
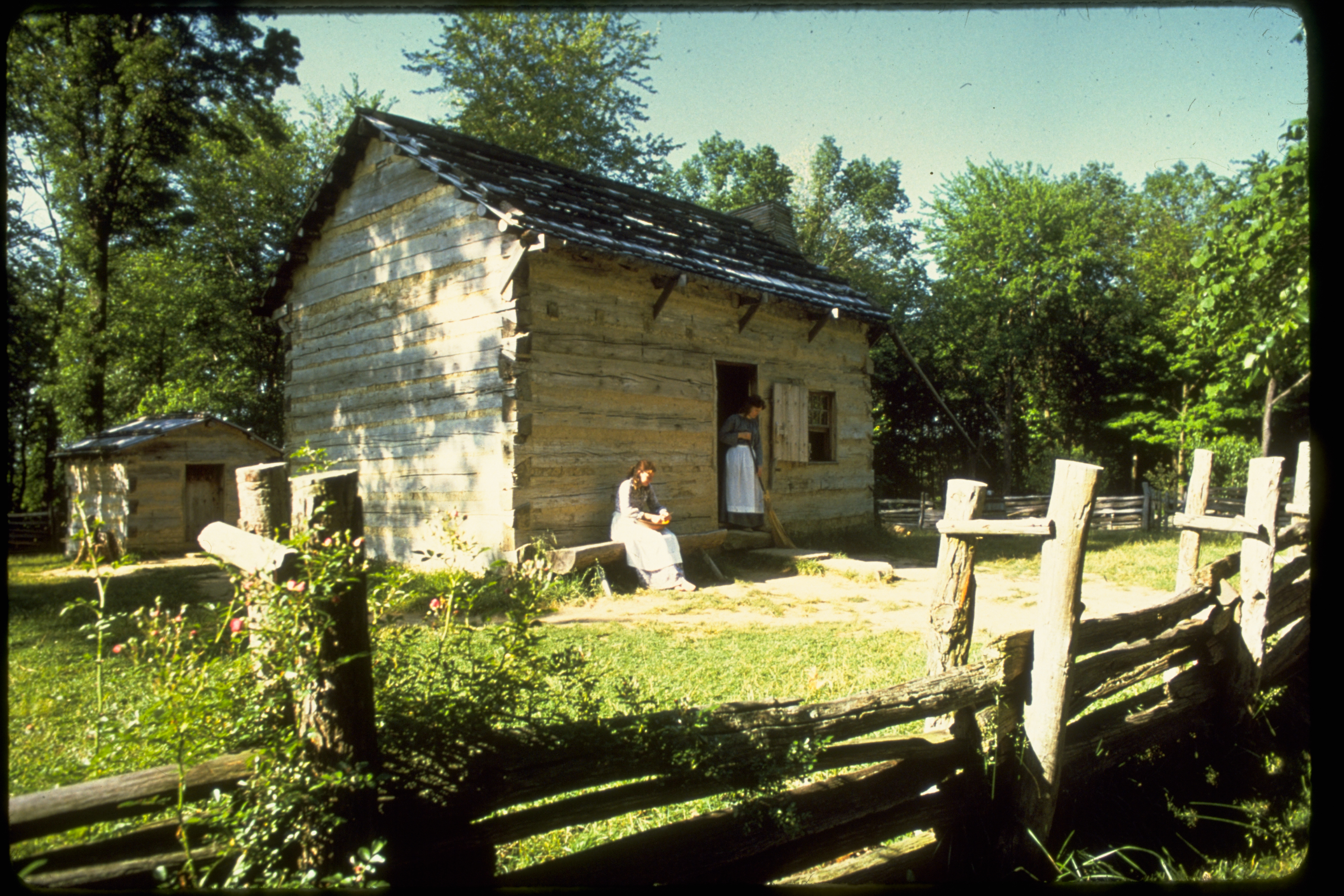
Lincoln Boyhood National Memorial, Indiana. This is a replica of the home that Sarah came to after marrying Thomas Lincoln. It is here that she raised her three children, Thomas' two children and Dennis Hanks, Nancy Hanks Lincoln's cousin.

Thomas Lincoln (1778–1851) met Sarah in Elizabethtown, Kentucky. After Nancy died in 1818, Thomas returned to Elizabethtown as he had heard that Sarah Bush Johnston was then a widow. His proposal was apparently: "I have no wife and you no husband. I came a-purpose to marry you. I knowed you from a gal and you knowed me from a boy. I've no time to lose: and if you're willin' let it be done straight off." The two decided to marry, and Lincoln paid her outstanding debts. Sarah and Thomas married on December 2, 1819, in a log house on Main Street in Elizabethtown. He brought her and her three children, who ranged from eight to 13 years of age, to his farm in Indiana, where Sarah became stepmother to his two children. She transformed the home with the addition of furniture and furnishings that would have seemed luxurious to the Lincolns, cleaned up the house and children, and insisted upon the placement of a wooden floor in the cabin, a loft for the boys (John Johnston, Abraham Lincoln, and Dennis Hanks), and the creation of a greased paper window and completion of the roof.

Dennis Hanks described Sarah:

'Maybe it was somethin' she tuk comfort in to have a man that didn't drink an' cuss none. She made a heap more o' Tom, too, than pore Nancy did. Before winter he'd put in a new floor, he'd whipsawed an' planed off so she could scour it; made some good beds an' cheers, an' tinkered at the roof so it couldn't snow on us boys 'at slep' in the loft. Purty soon we had the best house in the kentry. Thar was eight of us then to do fur, but Aunt Sairy had faculty an' didn't 'pear to be hurried or worried none. Little Sairy just chirked right up with a mother an' two sisters fur comp'ny.

She treated Sarah and Abraham Lincoln the same as her own children, earning the lasting affection of Abraham, who was 10 when she arrived; he always addressed her as "Mama." Sarah encouraged his appetite for reading and learning, giving Abraham access to books she had brought from Kentucky, including the Bible, Aesop's Fables, The Pilgrim's Progress and Lessons in Elocution.

Sarah's daughter, Elizabeth, married Dennis Hanks in 1821, and the couple lived in their own home about a half a mile from Sarah and Thomas' home. In 1823, Sarah, Thomas, and his daughter, joined the nearby Little Pigeon Creek Baptist Church. Although Abraham did not join the church, he attended church and listened to sermons; he sometimes got in trouble for parodying the minister's sermons. In 1826, Abraham's sister Sarah married Aaron Grigsby and lived near the Lincoln home; she died within a year and a half during childbirth. Her grave is located at the Lincoln State Park. Matilda married shortly after Sarah was married and moved away with her husband Squire Hall.

==== Illinois ====
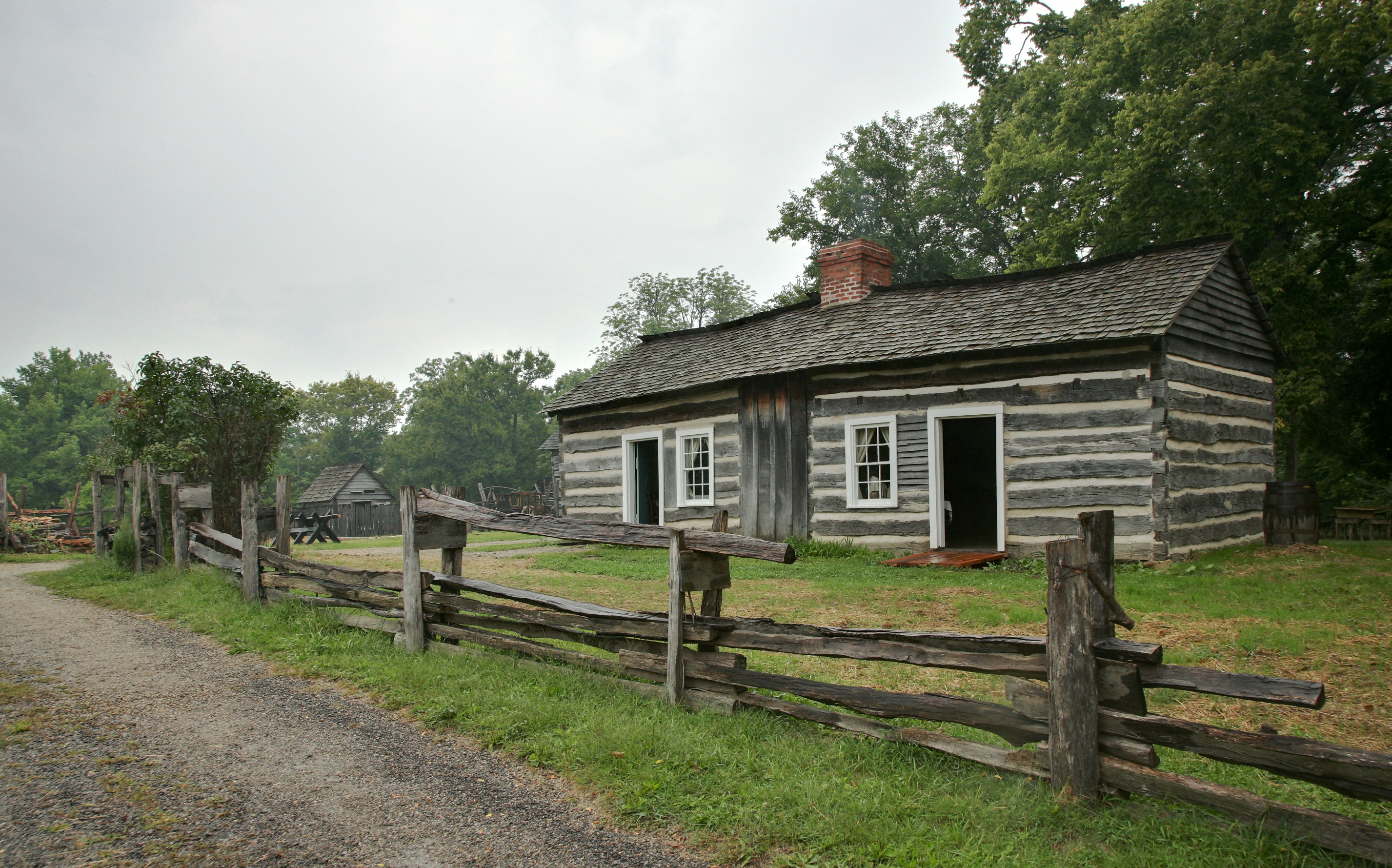
The reconstructed "Lincoln Log Cabin" was the home of Thomas Lincoln and Sarah Bush Johnston Lincoln in Illinois.

Thomas sold his Indiana land early in 1830, and with Sarah moved first to Macon County, Illinois, and eventually to Coles County the following year. The homestead site on Goosenest Prairie, about 10 miles (16 km) south of Charleston, Illinois, is preserved as the Lincoln Log Cabin State Historic Site.

Abraham sometimes visited Sarah and Thomas when he was in Coles County on the law circuit; Sarah recalled that she "saw him every year or two." After Thomas died in 1851, Lincoln maintained land for Sarah and supported her until his death in 1865. Their final visit was before Lincoln left Illinois for the White House. Illinois historian Charles H. Coleman recounted two narratives of how she received the news of her stepson's murder:

Mrs. Lincoln was living with the Halls at the Goosenest Prairie farm at the time of Lincoln's assassination. Dennis Hanks recalled in 1889 that he brought her the sad news. "'Aunt Sairy,' sez I, 'Abe's dead.' Yes, I know Denny. I knowed they'd kill him. I ben awaitin' fur it,' and she never asked no questions. She was getting purty old, an' I reckon she thought she'd like to jine him." Hanks did not mention the presence of [John J.] Hall, who later gave his own account of the same incident. He remembered that when she got the news of Abraham's death "she jest put her apern over her face and cried out 'Oh my boy Abe; They've killed him. I knowed they would. I knowed they would.' She never had no heart after that to be chirp and peart like she used to be."

Sarah died on April 12, 1869, at age 80. (Note: Sarah was the homeowner on the 1860 United States Federal Census living in Pleasant Grove, Illinois. With her were five members of the John Hall family, who farmed the 40 acre property in Cole County.) She is buried next to Thomas in nearby Shiloh Cemetery, just south of Lerna, Illinois.

== Abraham and Sarah's relationship ==
The Sarah Bush Johnston Lincoln biography by the National Park Service summarizes the relationship between Abraham Lincoln and his stepmother:

'She proved to be a good and kind mother' to him. By all reports their relationship was excellent, and Mrs. Lincoln considered her stepson a model child who was always honest, witty, and 'diligent for knowledge.' He never needed a 'cross word.' In all the vast literature of controversy over Lincoln's early years, there is hardly an unkind word about Sarah Bush Johnston Lincoln.

Lincoln's legendary sense of humor was probably influenced by his stepmother. He recalled that she was a firm but kind-hearted woman who loved to laugh. When he was 18 years old, Lincoln, at 6' 4", was so tall that his head nearly touched the ceiling of the family's farmhouse kitchen. His stepmother repeatedly joked that Lincoln was so tall that he needed to keep his hair washed or he would leave prints on her ceiling. Lincoln decided to have some fun with this idea. One day, when his stepmother was not home, Lincoln got together a group of younger boys and had them dip their bare feet in the mud outside the farmhouse kitchen. Then Lincoln took each of the boys inside, held them upside-down, and had them walk their feet across the ceiling, leaving muddy footprints. When Sarah Lincoln saw the muddy footprints on her ceiling, Lincoln recalled, she chuckled as she threatened to spank him.

== Honors ==
- Sarah Bush Johnston Lincoln Memorial in Elizabethtown, Kentucky
- The homestead where she and Thomas lived in Illinois is preserved as the Lincoln Log Cabin State Historic Site.
- The Sarah Bush Lincoln Health Center in Coles County, Illinois was named after her.

== Notes ==
Honorary titles
Preceded by Jane Polk	Step Mother of the President of the United States; March 4, 1861 - April 15, 1865	Succeeded by Mary McDonough Johnson
