= Santa's workshop =

Legendary workshop in the story of Santa Claus

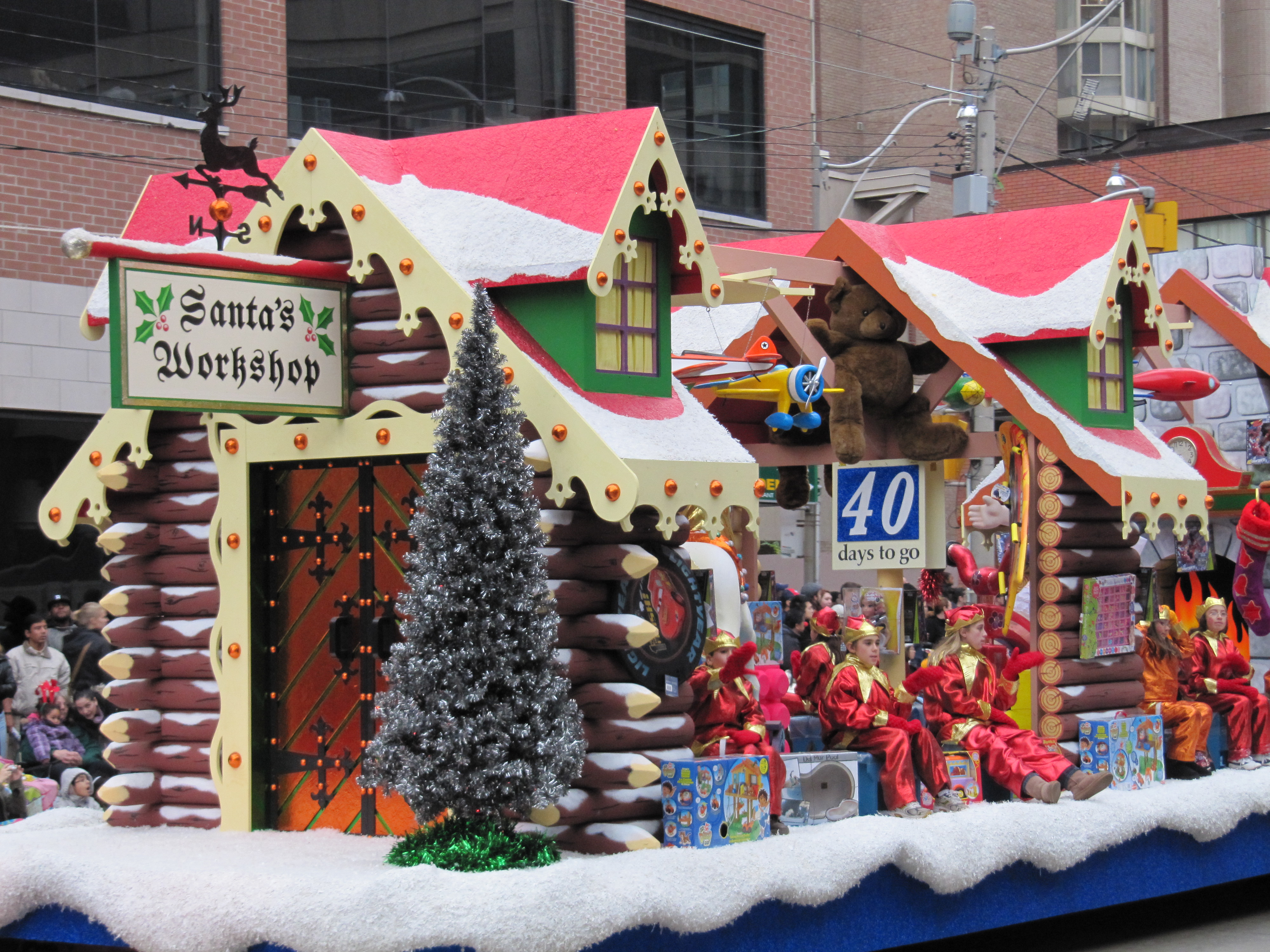
- A representation of the exterior view of the workshop from the 2009 Santa Claus Parade in Toronto, Ontario, Canada

General information
- Type: Workshop
- Location: North Pole
- Owner: Santa Claus

In Christmas folklore and legends, Santa's Workshop is the workshop where Santa Claus and his elves live and make the toys and presents given out at Christmas. The exact location of Santa's workshop varies depending upon local culture; however, it is generally said to be somewhere around or on the North Pole. There are at least eight claimed locations for his workshop. For example, people in Canada send letters to Santa's Workshop at his North Pole location in Canada, with the unique postal code of "H0H 0H0", stylized as H0 H0 H0. In the United States, the workshop is considered to be a sprawling commune located at the North Pole. Some people in the United Kingdom and Finland believe that Father Christmas' Workshop is located in Northern Finland in Korvatunturi, Lapland. In addition to housing the factory where toys are either manufactured or distributed by the elves, the complex also houses the residence of Santa, his wife, companions, and all of the reindeer.

== Santa Claus grottos and department stores ==
In the late 19th century, it became common during December in large shops or department stores to have a "cavern" in which an actor dressed up as Santa Claus would give gifts to people. Grottos can be large walk-through fantasy cavern-like areas incorporating animatronic characters, such as elves and pantomime characters. A concept devised by Liverpool-based retail entrepreneur David Lewis to attract customers to his department store, this tradition started in Britain in 1879 and then, from the 1890s onward, extended to Australian and American department stores.

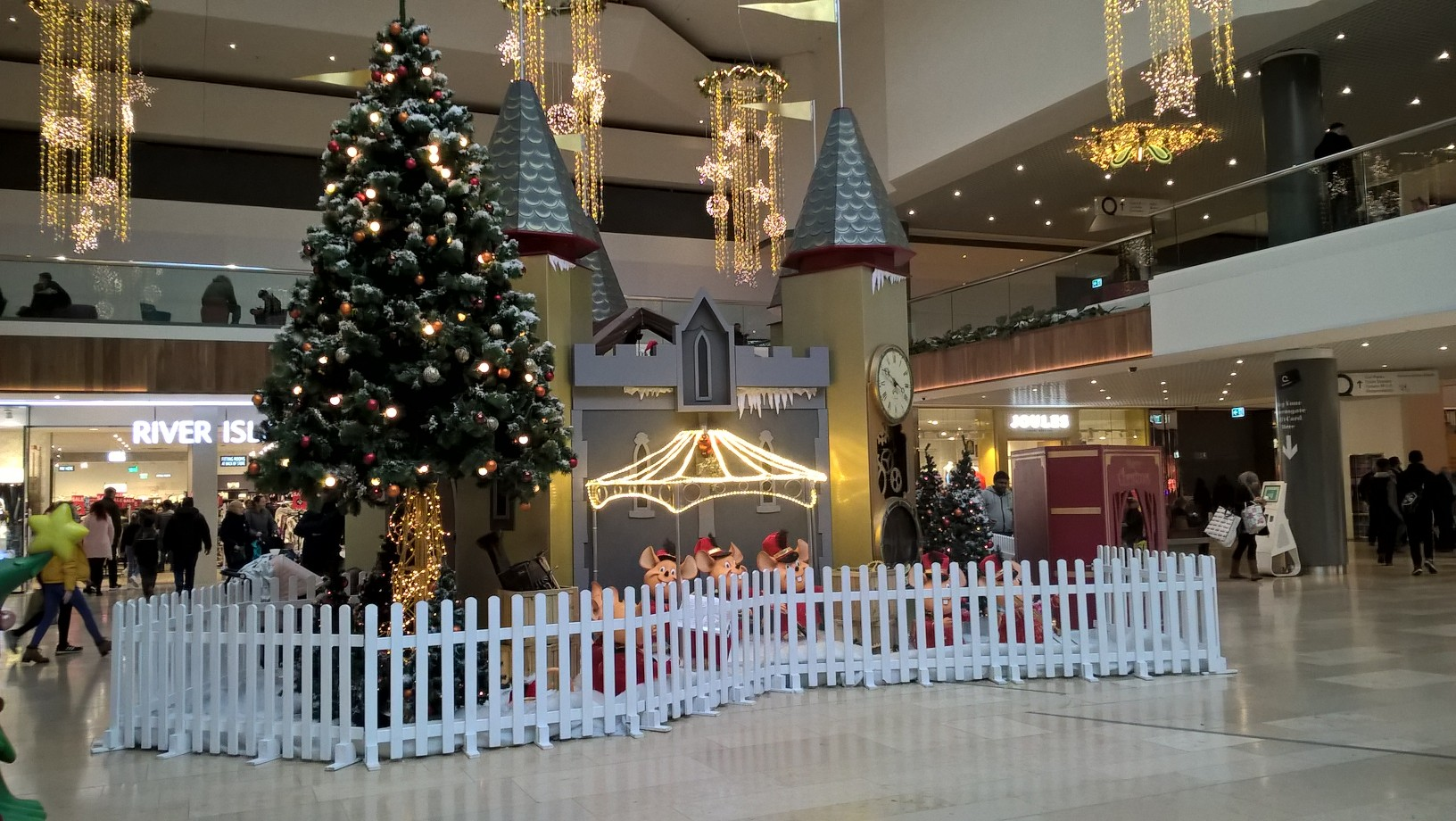
Grotto at Queensgate Shopping Centre, Peterborough, England

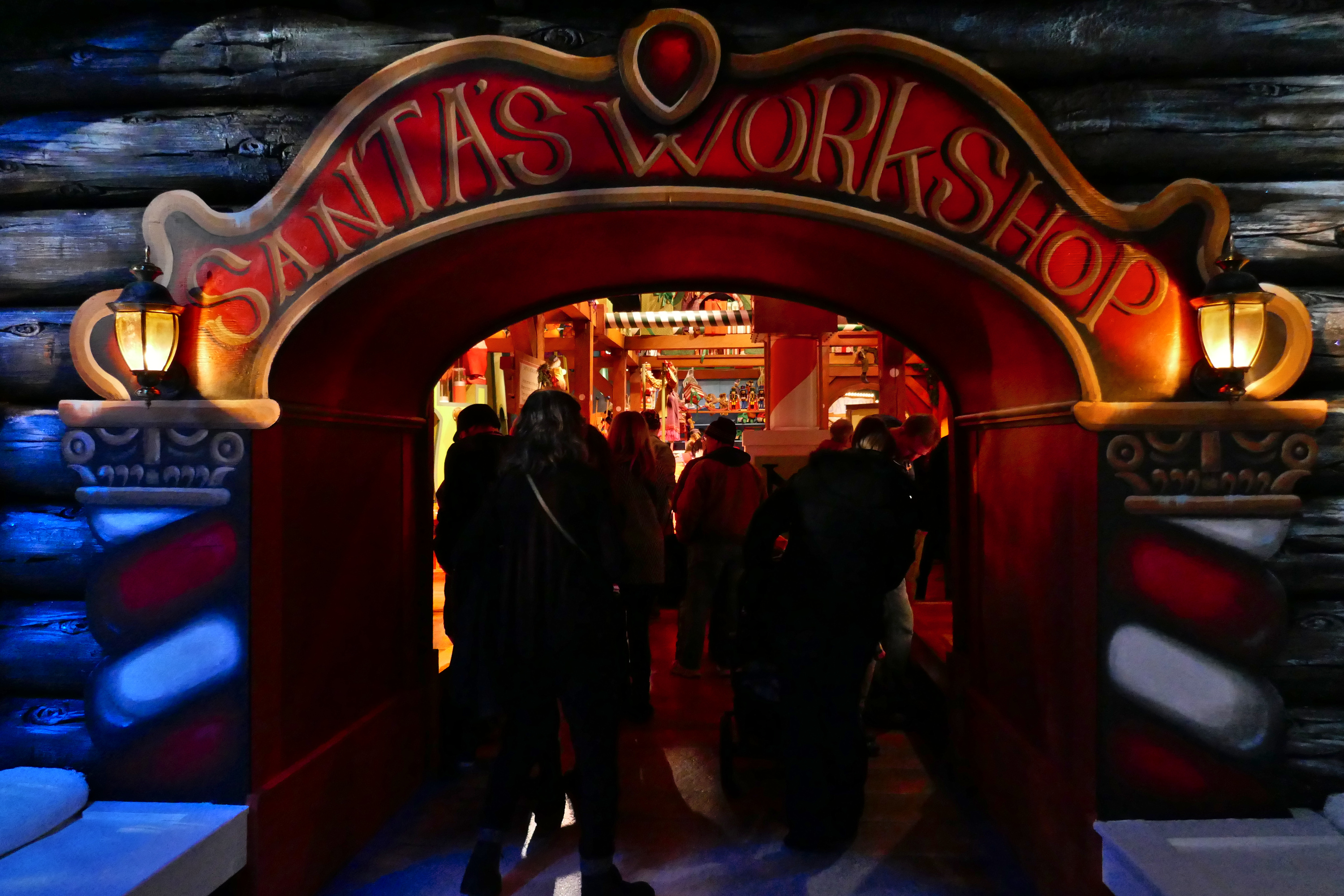
Santa's Workshop at Dayton's Department Store in Minneapolis

The world's first Christmas grotto was in Lewis's Bon Marche department store in Liverpool, England. The grotto was opened in 1879, entitled "Christmas Fairyland." The idea then took hold in the rest of the UK. A staple of Liverpool's festive season, many generations first visited Father Christmas at Lewis's, with the final displays covering over 10,000 square feet (930 m^{2}). The grotto has now moved to St Johns Market, St Johns Shopping Centre after being saved by entrepreneur Guy Fennell in 2017. The grotto runs by the name 'Liverpool's Famous Grotto'. Shopping malls have also set up interactive exhibits.

In Adelaide, South Australia, the first "Magic Cave" was set up in 1896 at the John Martin's department store on Rundle Street (now Rundle Mall). An annual store-sponsored parade, the Adelaide Christmas Pageant, was initiated in 1933 during which Father Christmas was conducted at the Magic Cave to formally herald the holiday season. Since the closure of John Martin's, the David Jones stores, have continued the tradition of the Magic Cave.

It is traditional that the people receive a toy from Father Christmas, upon visiting his grotto whether in a shopping mall or a little garden center. Grottos are sometimes free and they sometimes charge parents to let their children see Santa and receive a surprise gift.

== Amusement parks ==
A themed attraction in Santa Claus, Indiana named Santa's Candy Castle emulates the traditional depiction of Santa's workshop. There is also a Santa's Workshop amusement park in North Pole, New York. A 1946 theme park Holiday World & Splashin' Safari was known as "Santa Claus Land" prior to 1984 and is in Santa Claus, Indiana. Another location for Santa's Workshop, (since 1960), can also be found in North Pole Colorado - better known as Cascade Colorado - year-round.

== Elves ==
The image of the elves in the workshop was popularized by Godey's Lady's Book, with a front cover illustration for its 1873 Christmas issue showing Santa surrounded by toys and elves with the caption, "Here we have an idea of the preparations that are made to supply the young folks with toys at Christmas time."

== Location ==
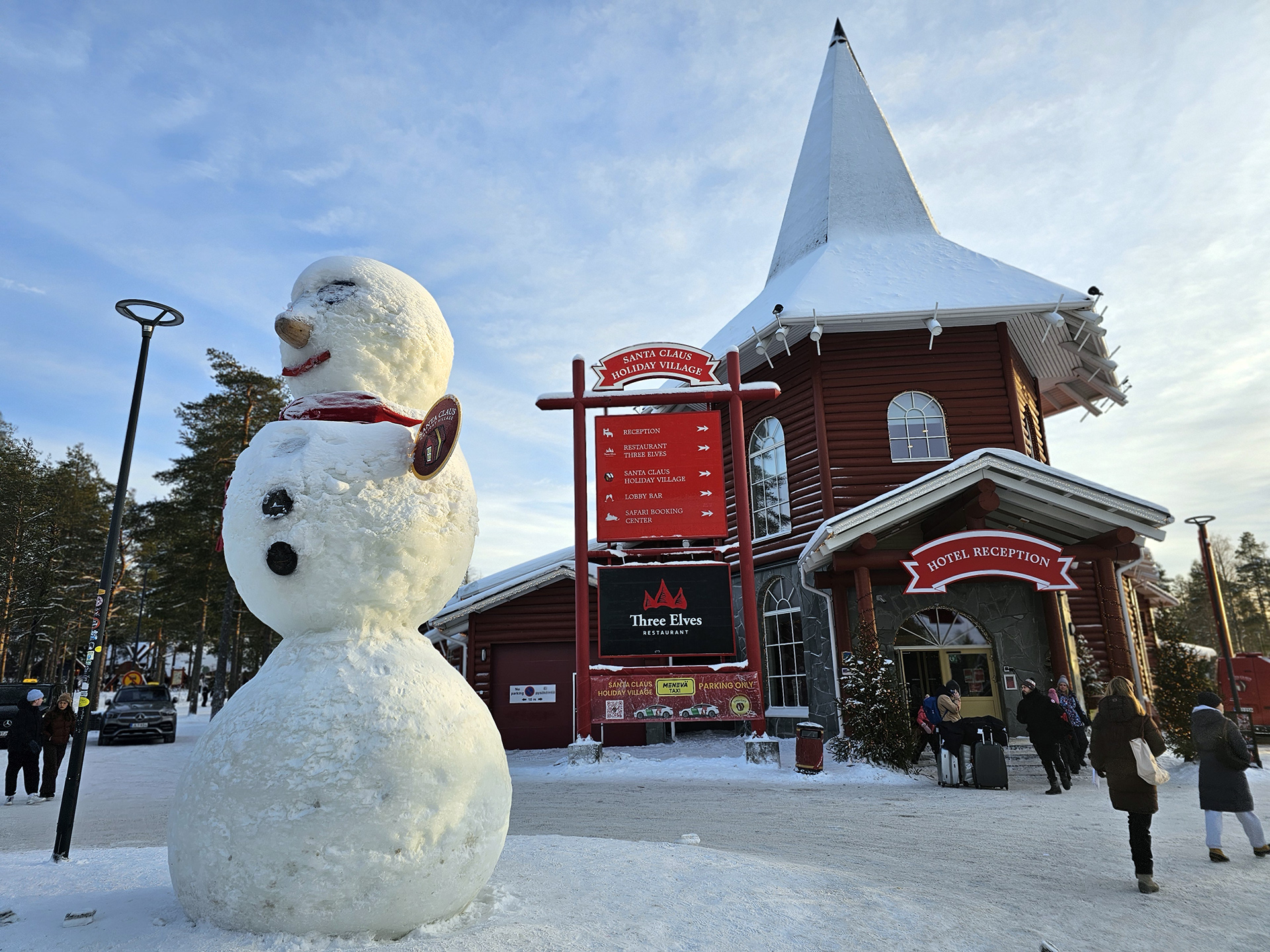
Santa Claus Village in Rovaniemi, Finland

From 1879 to 1886, Thomas Nast published a series of drawings introducing the idea that Santa's workshop is at the North Pole. The Canada Post postal code for the workshop is H0H 0H0. The United States Postal Service recommends mail to Santa's workshop be sent to 123 Elf Road, North Pole, 88888. The British postal service, Royal Mail, recommends letters be sent to Santa/Father Christmas, Santa's Grotto, Reindeerland, XM4 5HQ.

Each Nordic country also claims Santa's workshop to be located on their territories. Norway claims he lives in Drøbak. In Denmark, he is said to live near Uummannaq, in Greenland. In Sweden, the town of Mora has a theme park named "Santaworld". The national postal terminal in Tomteboda in Stockholm receives children's letters for Santa. In Finland, Korvatunturi in Lapland has long been known as Santa's home, and two theme parks, Santa Claus Village and Santa Park are located at the Arctic Circle in the municipality of Rovaniemi.

== See also ==
- Santa's Workshop (amusement park)
- Santa's Workshop (film)
