= Santa Claus Museum and Village =

Tourist attraction in Santa Claus, Indiana

Coordinates: 38°06′55″N 86°54′34″W

Santa Claus Museum & Village is an attraction being developed near the community of Santa Claus, Indiana. In 2005, a local development company purchased Santa's Candy Castle and other buildings that comprised Santa Claus Town and announced plans to restore and re-open them to the public. Santa's Candy Castle was the first building of the original Santa Claus Town to be re-opened to the public, when its doors opened on July 1, 2006. The 40-ton, 22-foot concrete Santa Claus statue was restored in 2011. In 2012, a local historic church and the town's original post office were moved to the site next to the large Santa Claus statue.

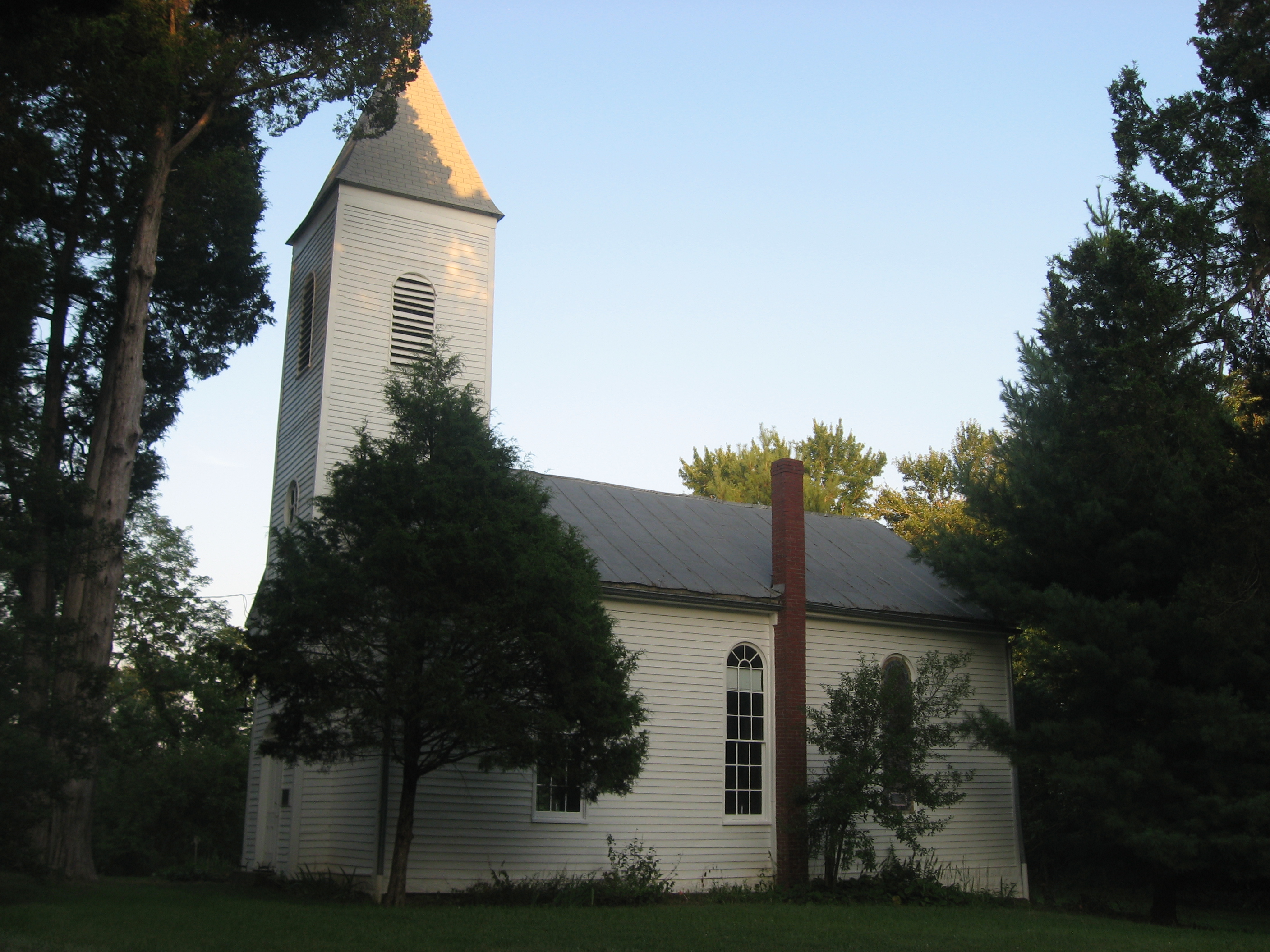
Deutsch Evangelische St. Paul's Kirche at its original location

Deutsch Evangelische St. Paul’s Kirche was relocated to the park in 2012. It was built in 1880. It was listed on the National Register of Historic Places.

== Background ==
The town of Santa Claus was designed in 1849. On May 21, 1856, the name of Santa Claus was accepted by the United States Post Office Department, and the first post office was opened with John Specht as its first postmaster. On June 25, 1895, the post office name was changed to the one word Santaclaus.

The town's unique name went largely unnoticed until the late 1920s, when Postmaster James Martin began promoting the Santa Claus postmark. The name was changed back to Santa Claus on February 17, 1928. It was then that the Post Office Department decided there would never be another Santa Claus Post Office in the United States, due to the influx of holiday mail and the staffing and logistical problems this caused. The growing volume of holiday mail became so substantial that it caught the attention of Robert Ripley in 1929, who featured the town's post office in his nationally syndicated Ripley's Believe It or Not cartoon strip.

The town's name caught the attention of Vincennes, Indiana entrepreneur Milt Harris. He created Santa's Candy Castle, the first tourist attraction in Santa Claus, Indiana, which is also purported to be the first themed attraction in the United States.

=== Santa Claus Town and its rival ===
Santa Claus Town attractions included a red-brick Candy Castle, sponsored by Curtiss Candy and dedicated December 22, 1935, and the Toy Village, a series of miniature fairytale buildings sponsored by prominent national toy manufacturers. Santa Claus Town led to the creation of the town's first newspaper, The Santa Claus Town News, and the Santa Claus Chamber of Commerce.

Harris' project caught the attention of a rival entrepreneur, Carl Barrett, the Chicago head of the Illinois Auto Club. Disliking what he called Harris' materialism, Barrett planned his own tourist attraction: Santa Claus Park.

On December 25, 1935, Barrett dedicated a 22-foot (6.7 m) tall statue of Santa Claus that was erected on the highest hill in town. The statue was promoted as being solid granite, although it was subsequently revealed to be concrete when cracks formed years later.

Years of lawsuits between Harris and Barrett were costly distractions for the two entrepreneurs. The lawsuits centered around land ownership and went all the way to the Indiana Supreme Court. National news media covered the ongoing story of "Too Many Santas." Over the years both entrepreneurs' projects became vacant and neglected.
