= Santa's workshop (disambiguation) =

Santa's workshop is where Santa Claus is said to make Christmas gifts.

Santa's workshop may also refer to:

- Santa's Workshop (film), a 1932 animated short by Disney
- Santa's Workshop (New York amusement park) in Wilmington, New York
- Santa's Workshop (Colorado amusement park) in Cascade, Colorado
