= Santa Claus, Arizona =

Ghost town in Mohave County, Arizona

- Ghost town
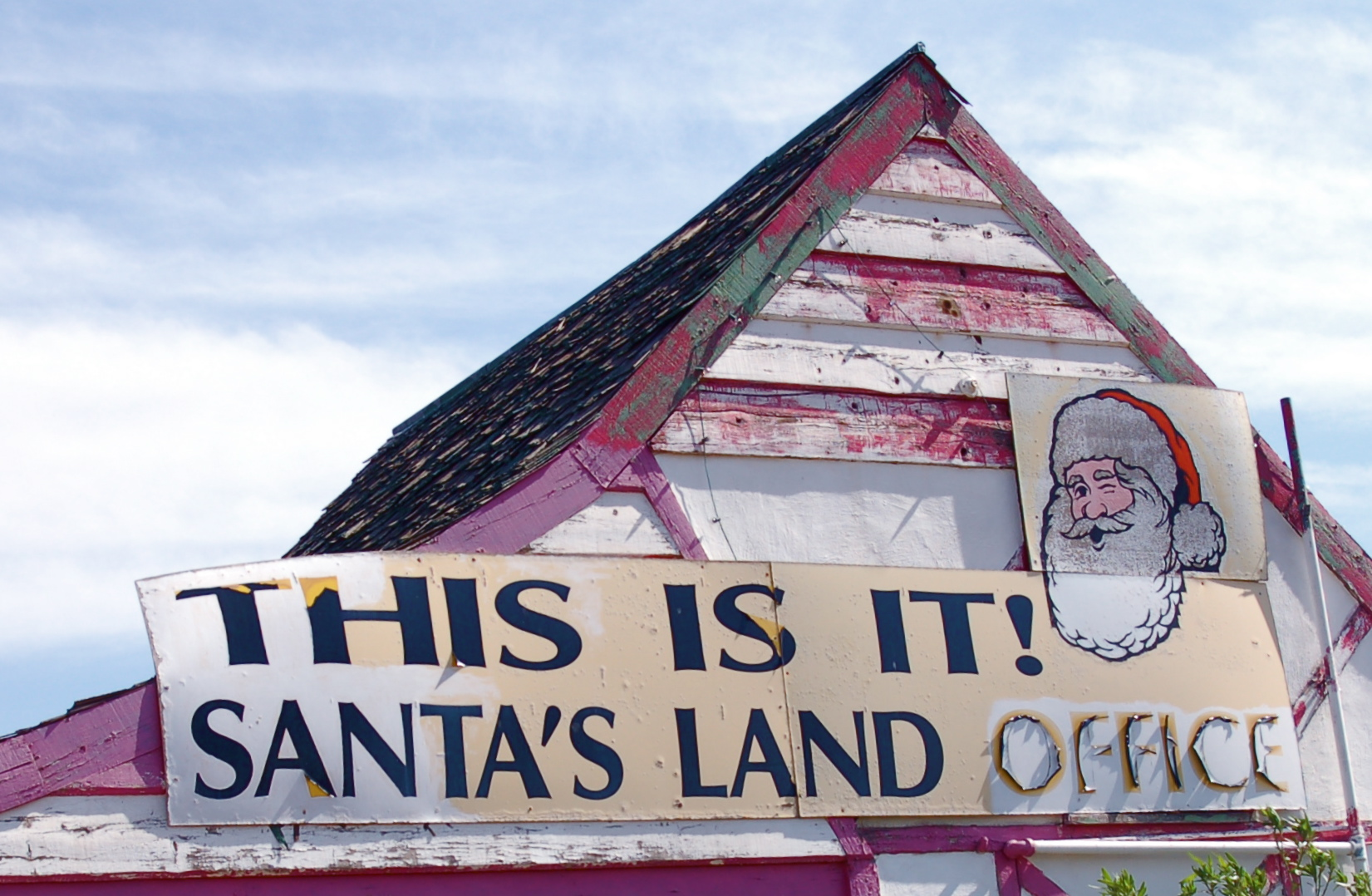
- Santa Claus Land sign. The "office" portion was added later.

- Location within Arizona
- Coordinates: 35°20′12″N 114°12′59″W
- Country: United States
- State: Arizona
- County: Mohave
- Founded: 1937
- Abandoned: 1995

Area
  - Total: 0.00625 sq mi (0.0162 km^{2})
  - Land: 0.00625 sq mi (0.0162 km^{2})
  - Water: 0 sq mi (0.0 km^{2})
- Elevation: 3,392.0 ft (1,033.88 m)
- Time zone: UTC-7 (MST)
- ZIP codes: 86401
- Area code: 928

Santa Claus (also known as Santa Claus Acres) is an uninhabited desert place in Mohave County, Arizona, United States. Originating in 1937, Santa Claus lies approximately 14 miles (23 km) northwest of Kingman, Arizona, along U.S. Route 93 between mile markers 57 and 58, immediately north of Hermit Drive and just south of both Grasshopper Junction, Arizona, and the Junk Art of Chloride, a group of metal statues in Chloride, Arizona, that include a flamingo made out of a motorcycle gas tank. Characterized in 1988 as "a little roadside place on the west shoulder of U.S. Route 93," Santa Claus receives traffic from motorists driving between Phoenix, Arizona, and Las Vegas, Nevada, or Hoover Dam.

In connection with its beginnings in 1937, Santa Claus received several attractions and buildings, including the Kit Carson Guest House which was renamed the Santa Claus Inn. Nina Talbot, a real estate woman and the owner of Santa Claus, made plans to use the Santa theme in a parched desert location to attract buyers for her surrounding, subdivided land. By 1942, the town of Santa Claus had become a full-fledged tourist spot.

After twelve years operating Santa Claus, Talbot's land resale plans for Santa Claus never materialized, in part because the only inhabitants in the town were the ones working there. Talbot sold her interest in the town in 1949. Others made plans during the 1950s to improve Santa Claus, which received publicity through the writings of American novelist and famed science fiction writer Robert A. Heinlein and U.S. pioneer restaurant rater Duncan Hines and through 1961 remailing service advertisements offering to postmark letters from Santa Claus, for a small fee.

The popularity of Santa Claus declined in the 1970s. In July 1983, owner Tony Wilcox unsuccessfully offered to sell Santa Claus for $95,000, which was reduced to $52,500 by 1988. All remaining operating businesses in the town closed in 1995. In the 2000s, the town became difficult to locate. All that remained were several vandalized buildings, a wishing well, and the "Old 1225"—a pink children's train tagged with graffiti covering hand-painted renderings of Santa and his elves. The abandoned town was torn down some time in late 2021 or early 2022.

== History ==
=== Early years ===
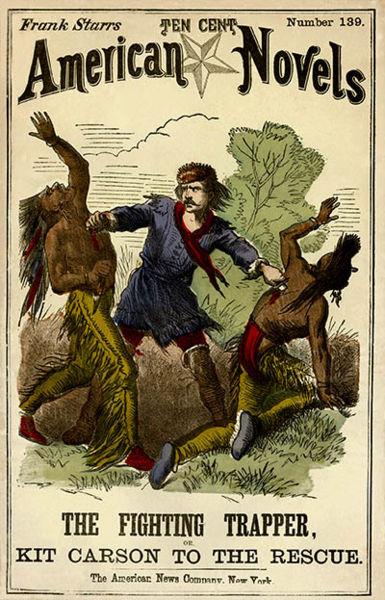
The legend of American frontiersman Kit Carson continued to grow after his 1868 death through dime novels, such as the one above.

In the 1930s, Nina Talbot (not to be confused with the actress of a similar name) and her husband moved from Los Angeles, California, to Kingman, Arizona, to operate a motel. Talbot held herself out as the biggest real estate agent in California, but also weighed 300 pounds at that time. In 1937, she opened the town of Santa Claus approximately 14 miles (23 km) northwest of Kingman. Her plans for the town included subdividing the 80-acre (32 ha) site into lots that would form a resort town centered on a Santa theme in a parched desert location. Talbot built a series of buildings using a North Pole, Santa's workshop theme as part of the Santa Claus (or Santa's Workshop) attraction. The attraction was designed to promote the sales of surrounding, subdivided land.

In the early years, Santa Claus presented a popular attraction and featured a U.S. post office and Christmas related buildings. Cinderella's Doll House was one of the buildings, designed to have the look of a Swiss chalet. Children could visit a real Santa Claus in the town at any time of the year. The post office was widely used in December by kids sending letters to the town addressed to Santa and by adults wanting their letters postmarked from "Santa Claus." The Kit Carson Guest House became part of Santa Claus and was named the Santa Claus Inn. The Santa Claus Inn served "a big farm breakfast" for $.75 in an air-conditioned restaurant and offered menu items such as Chicken à la North Pole and Rum Pie à la Kris Kringle. The restaurant became famed for its rum pie. The "French Room" part of the restaurant was highlighted in now vintage postcards and a photo of Santa Claus himself was placed over the restaurant's fireplace. By 1942, the town of Santa Claus had become a full-fledged tourist spot.

=== Decline ===
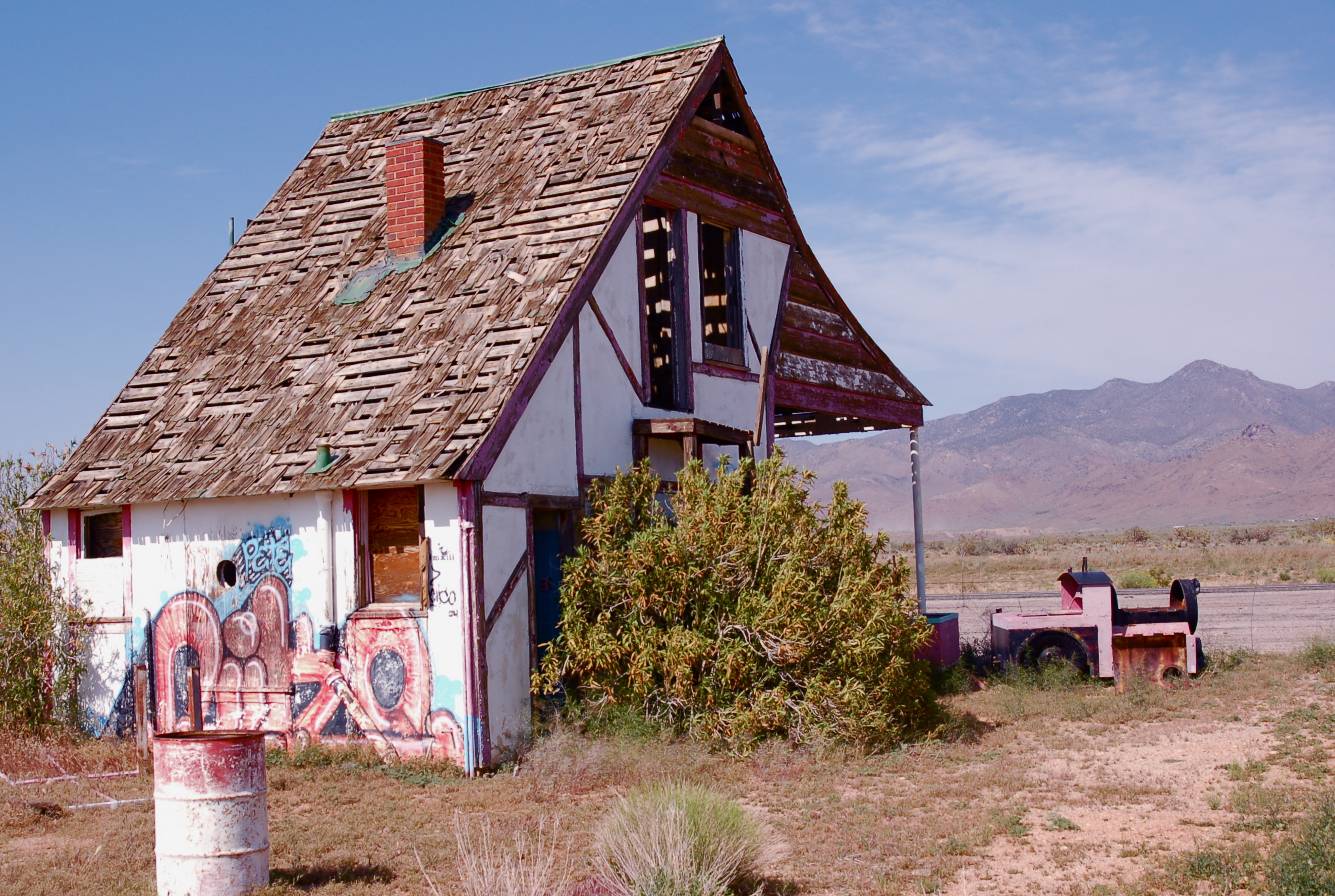
Rear view of the Santa Claus Land Sales Office looking northeast, 2008. To the right is the "Old 1225", a derailed, pink children's train tagged with graffiti. U.S. Route 93, Ithaca Peak (left), and Turquoise Mountain (right) can be seen in the background.

The Christmas Tree Inn, circa 1960s

Talbot continued to operate Santa Claus for the next 12 years. However, Talbot's resort town plans were never carried through, in part because the only inhabitants in the town were the ones working there. Talbot sold the town in 1949 essentially as an attraction that had a restaurant. In 1950, Santa Claus appeared as a real place in Cliff and the Calories (1950), a fictional short story by American novelist and science fiction writer Robert A. Heinlein. Heinlein describes a diet-shattering gourmet feast served by Mrs. Claus, in reality a Mrs. Douglas, who ran The Santa Claus Inn restaurant in the 1940s. The short story was reprinted in his 1982 book Expanded Universe. In the early 1950s, the Santa Claus Inn was renamed The Christmas Tree Inn. The Christmas Tree Inn received positive reviews from U.S. pioneer restaurant rater Duncan Hines, who noted at that time that The Christmas Tree Inn was one of the best eating places along Arizona State Route 66, though it is actually several miles off Route 66. This helped draw celebrities to the restaurant, such as actress Jane Russell, who threw a dinner party there for ten of her friends on August 5, 1954. At about that same time, a plan was put forth to plat the town with streets with names like Santa Street, Prancer Parkway, and Donner and divide the area into 1-acre (0.40 ha) house lots.

Santa Claus received some attention in 1961 when several advertisements appeared in the 1961 issue of Popular Mechanics, an American magazine devoted to science and technology. The advertisements offered remailing services where Christmas cards and letters would be remailed from Santa Claus, Arizona, at a cost of $.25 plus the postage for the remailing. The remailing service would result in a United States Postal Service postmark on the envelope reading Santa Claus, Arizona, something desirable around the annual Christmas holiday.

The popularity of Santa Claus declined in the 1970s. By the mid-1970s, the Santa Claus development closed. At some point, Santa Claus was removed from the official Arizona State Map. In July 1983, owner Tony Wilcox listed the entire town for sale. Wilcox sought $95,000 for the 4-acre (16,000 m^{2}) community. He had received an offer of $50,000, but turned it down, convinced that the town was worth much more.

In 1988, Santa Claus had three tiny, poorly maintained A-frame buildings painted to represent peppermint candies. American writer Mark Winegardner described Santa Claus at that time as being on its last legs. Additionally, Winegardner noted in his 1988 book Elvis Presley Boulevard: From Sea to Shining Sea, Almost, that

"Styrofoam silver bells, strands of burned-out Christmas lights and faded plastic likenesses of Old Saint Nick garnished this little village. A lopsided, artificial twenty-foot tree whistled in the wind beside a broken Coke machine and an empty ice freezer. Two of the three buildings were padlocked; through their windows, encrusted with layers of sand and decade-old aerosol snow, ... I saw dusty, overturned fiberglass statuettes of elves and reindeer. Alongside the SANTA CLAUS, ARIZONA/ESTABLISHED 1937 sign was another: FOR SALE BY OWNER/$52,500/INQUIRE AT GIFTSHOP. An arrow pointed the way."
"The gift shop stocked no seasonal items. Its shelves were littered with flea-market knickknacks at antique-shop prices. Battered paperbacks cost a buck. What little money the place generated must have come from the short-ordered grill and the soft-drinks cooler. On a stool behind the countertop cash register, a haggard, fiftyish man looked up from his circle-the-word puzzle and asked if we needed anything."

Prior to 1990, the U.S. Postal Service announced the release of its annual Christmas stamps in Santa Claus due to the town's holiday ring. In the early 1990s, the restaurant offered Dasher and Dancer omelette and Santa Claus burgers and oil portraits of John Wayne could be purchased from the shops. However, the last gift shops and child amusements went out of business in 1995.

In 2003, the population of Santa Claus was 10, divided among five houses, one of which had a buffalo. By 2004, the town had become difficult to locate. In that year, the town was identified as being located on the southward (western side) of the then newly divided and expanded, four-lane U.S. Route 93. The town was described as "an abandoned, road-rise pull off with a handful of old buildings – all closed" with "This is it! Santa's Land" and "Santa's Desert Retreat" being the only two signs left from the early days of the town.

Santa Claus, Arizona, had long lost its remailing service opportunities and, as of 2005, all U.S. mail addressed to Santa Claus is sent to Santa Claus, Indiana. In 2006, Santa Claus, Arizona, was noted as being abandoned and likely to become another lost American highway icon. In that same year, videographer Matt McCormick retraced and filmed the steps of his family road trip through Santa Claus in 1956. The resulting three-minute movie, Fifty Years Later (2006), included clips of Santa Claus in 1956 and comparison clips from the town in 2006. Presented at the 2007 Northwest Film and Video Festival, the film reveals the significant changes in the town over 50 years. As of 2007, the Christmas-themed architecture in the closed town of Santa Claus was listed for sale. What presently remains is several vandalized buildings, a wishing well, and the "Old 1225", a derailed, pink children's train tagged with graffiti that mar the hand-painted renderings of Santa and his elves on the train. As of early 2022, all remaining buildings have been removed.

== Geography ==
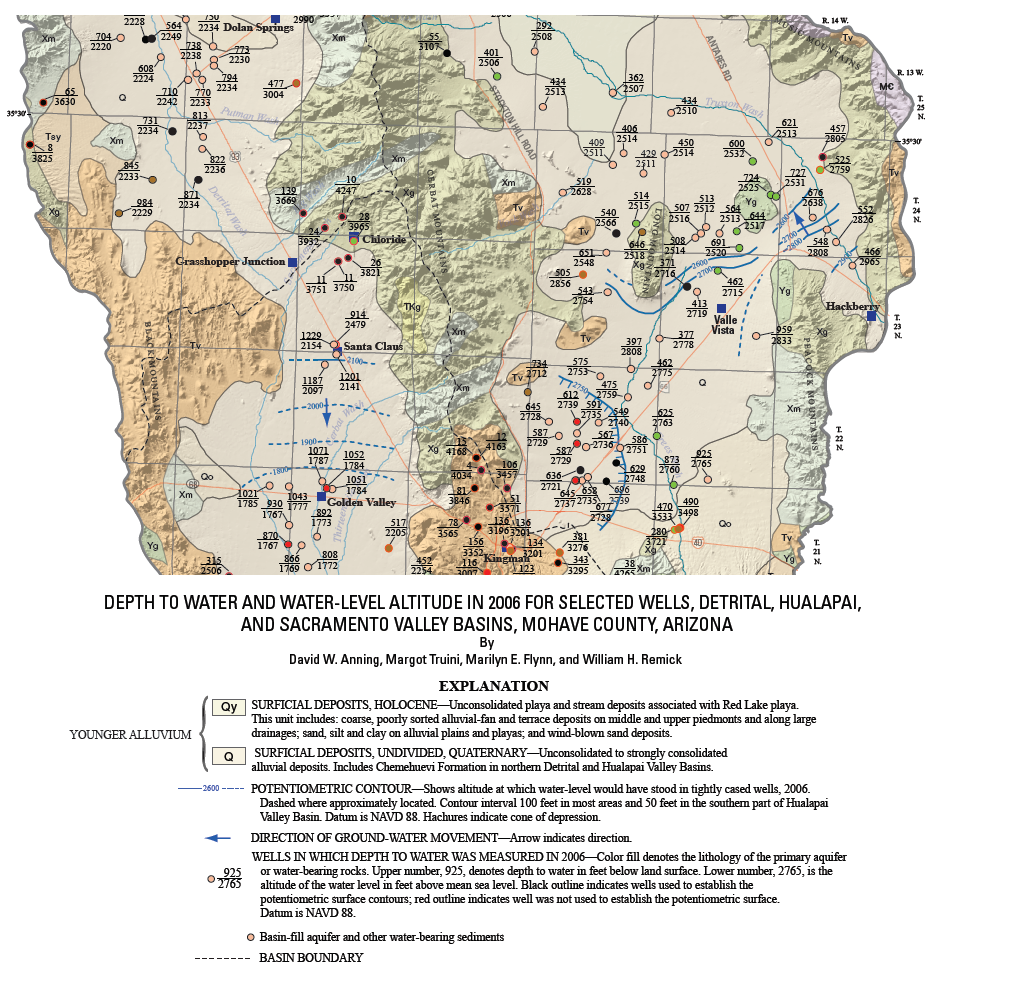
2006 United States Geological Survey survey of the depth to water and water-level altitude in the Santa Claus, Arizona area

In a 2006 United States Geological Survey survey of the depth to water and water-level altitude in Arizona, the younger alluvium surficial deposits atop Santa Claus were viewed as ranging from unconsolidated to strongly consolidated alluvial deposits. Residing in the Sacramento Valley basin, the ground water in Santa Claus is contained in a basin-fill aquifer and other water-bearing sediments at a depth of approximately 1,200 feet (370 m) below the land surface. Additionally, the underground water level resides approximately at an altitude of 2,100 feet (640 m) above mean sea level and is moving directly south.

== See also ==
- Chloride, Arizona
- Santa Claus, Indiana
- Santa Claus, Georgia
