= Sorghvliedt Castle =

Castle in Belgium

Coordinates: 51.1710°N 4.3533°E

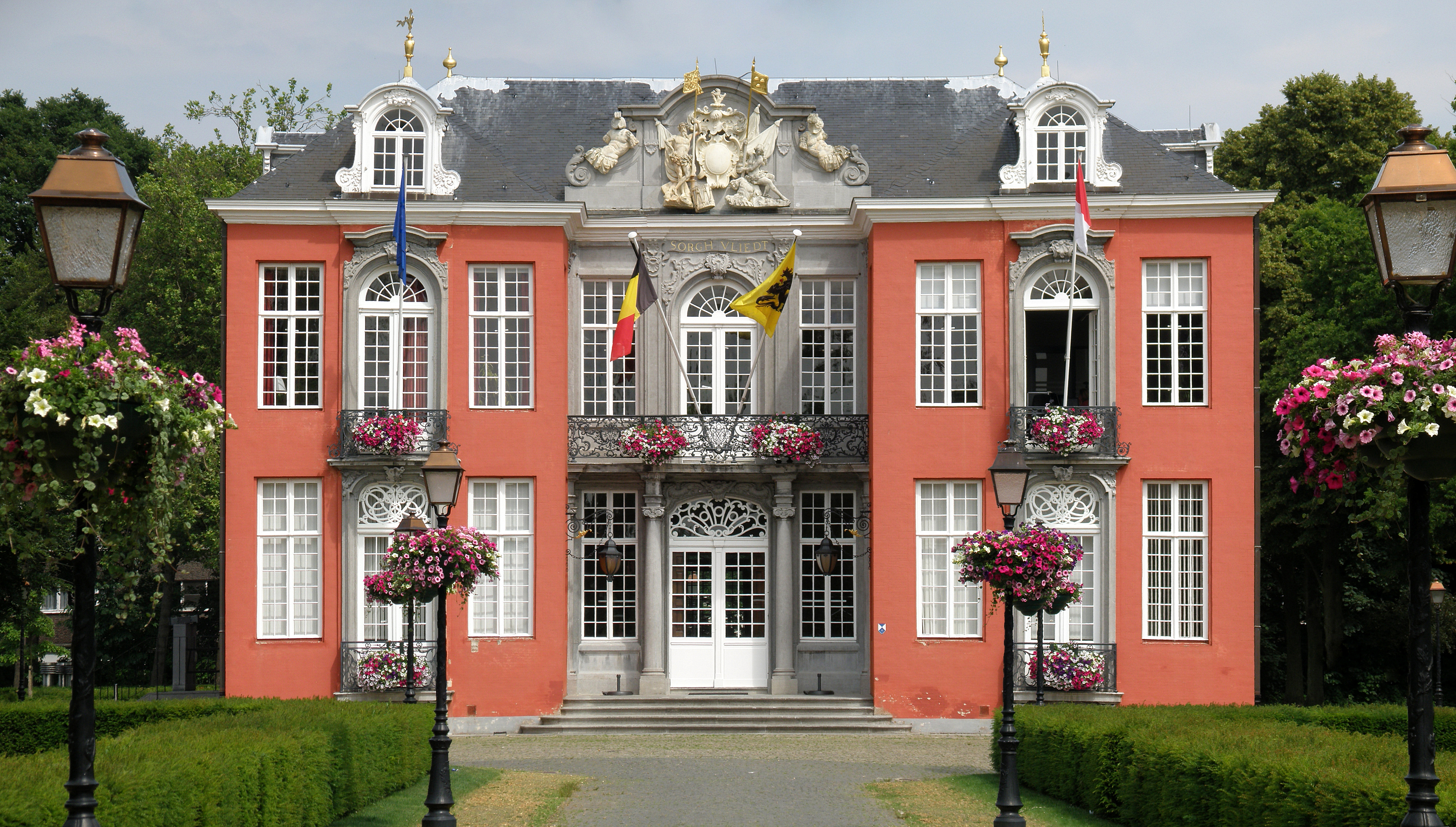
Sorghvliedt Castle

Sorghvliedt Castle (Dutch: Kasteel Sorghvliedt) is a building in Belgium with a history dating back to the 16th century. It was originally a farm building called Wickeleynde owned by the merchant Jean Plaquet and his wife Maria Leydeckers. In 1660, it came into the hands of the du Bois family. From 1745 to 1750 it was completely rebuilt by Arnold du Bois. The Rococo structure was designed by the architect Jan Pieter van Baurscheit the Younger (1699–1768). The castle and the surrounding park were purchased by the town of Hoboken in 1937. It became the town hall in 1940. From 1983, following the extension of Antwerp, the castle became the district hall of Hoboken.

In the park there is an orangerie and a belvedere on an artificial hill.

The castle is open to the public from 9 am to 1 pm on weekdays but is closed on public holidays.

== Exhibitions ==
The castle hosted retrospective exhibitions of American–Belgian artist Tony Mafia in 2002 and 2003.
