= Grasshopper Junction, Arizona =

Unincorporated community in the state of Arizona, United States

- Unincorporated community
- Location within Arizona Location within the United States
- Coordinates: 35°23′49″N 114°15′35″W
- Country: United States
- State: Arizona
- County: Mohave
- Elevation: 3,547 ft (1,081 m)
- Time zone: UTC-7 (MST)
- ZIP codes: 86401
- Area code: 928
- GNIS feature ID: 24437

Grasshopper Junction is an unincorporated community in Mohave County, Arizona, United States. Lying four miles (6 km) west of the town of Chloride, Grasshopper Junction provides access to a lone surviving mining camp along County Road 125. The area features the Grasshopper Junction restaurant as a roadside attraction.

== History ==
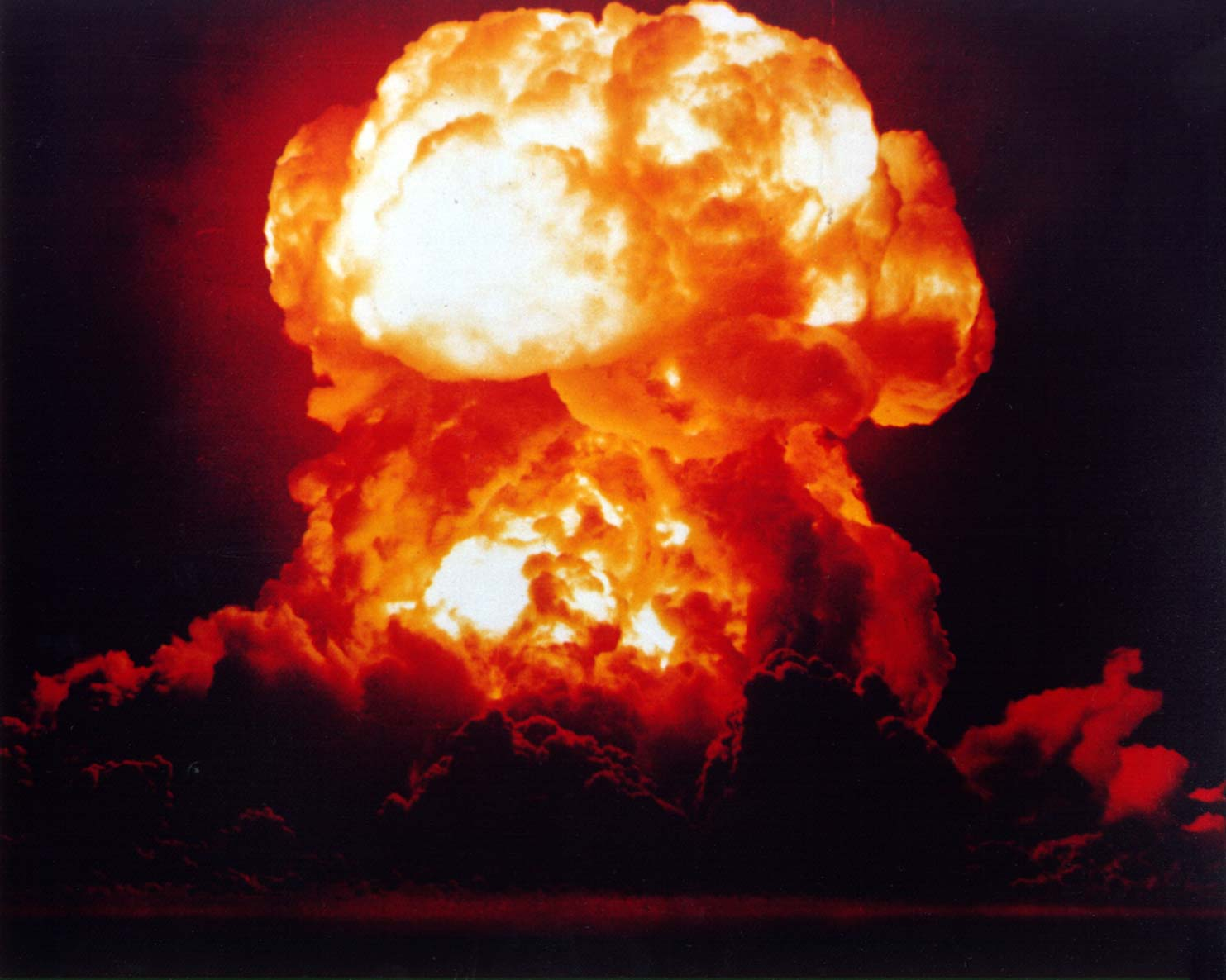
The "Smoky" shot of Operation Plumbbob

In January 1951, the United States government established the Nevada Test Site, a nuclear weapons testing reservation located in Nye County, Nevada, about 180 miles (290 km) northwest Grasshopper Junction. During the 1950s, the mushroom cloud from these tests could be seen for almost 100 miles (160 km) in either direction, including in the city of Las Vegas where the tests became tourist attractions. Between May 28 and October 7, 1957, the Nevada Test Site ran a series of nuclear tests called Operation Plumbbob. In 1958, the site carried out low-yield atmospheric and underground tests identified as Operation Hardtack II. As a result of Operation Plumbbob and Operation Hardtack, Grasshopper Junction became part of the June 22–26, 1959 hearings before the Special Subcommittee on Radiation of the Joint Committee on Atomic Energy. At the time, the population of Grasshopper Junction was two, and the first session of the 86th United States Congress determined that the estimated radiation dose received by the Grasshopper Junction population was 0.03 roentgen (8 microcoulombs per kilogram) before Operation Plumbbob (Pre-Plumbbob) and 0.03 roentgen (8 μC/kg) after Operation Hardtack II (Cumulative).

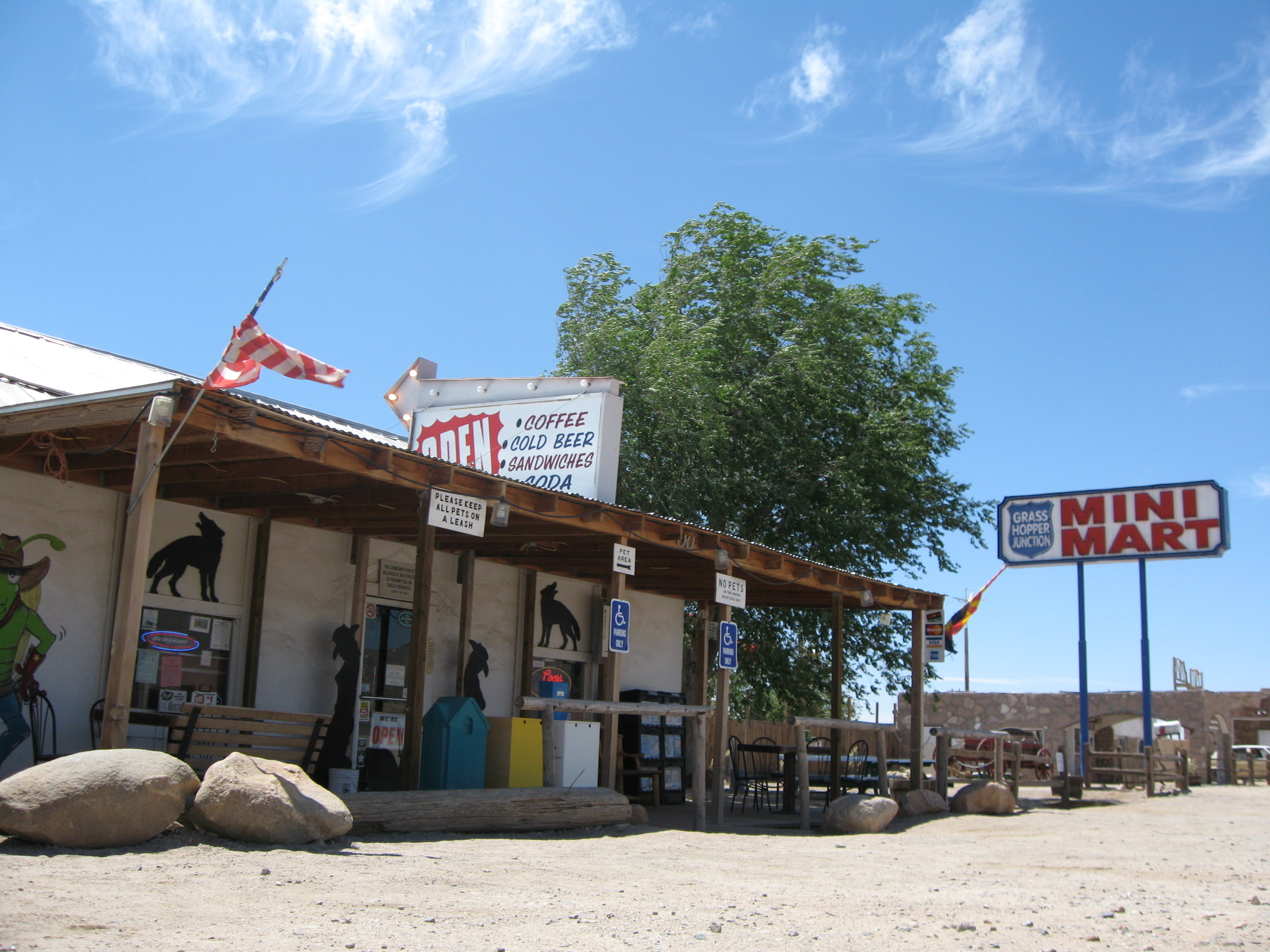
2007 photo of the Mini Mart at Grasshopper Junction, Arizona

In December 1975, a marker was erected across from Grasshopper Junction to honor the bicentennial of Chloride.

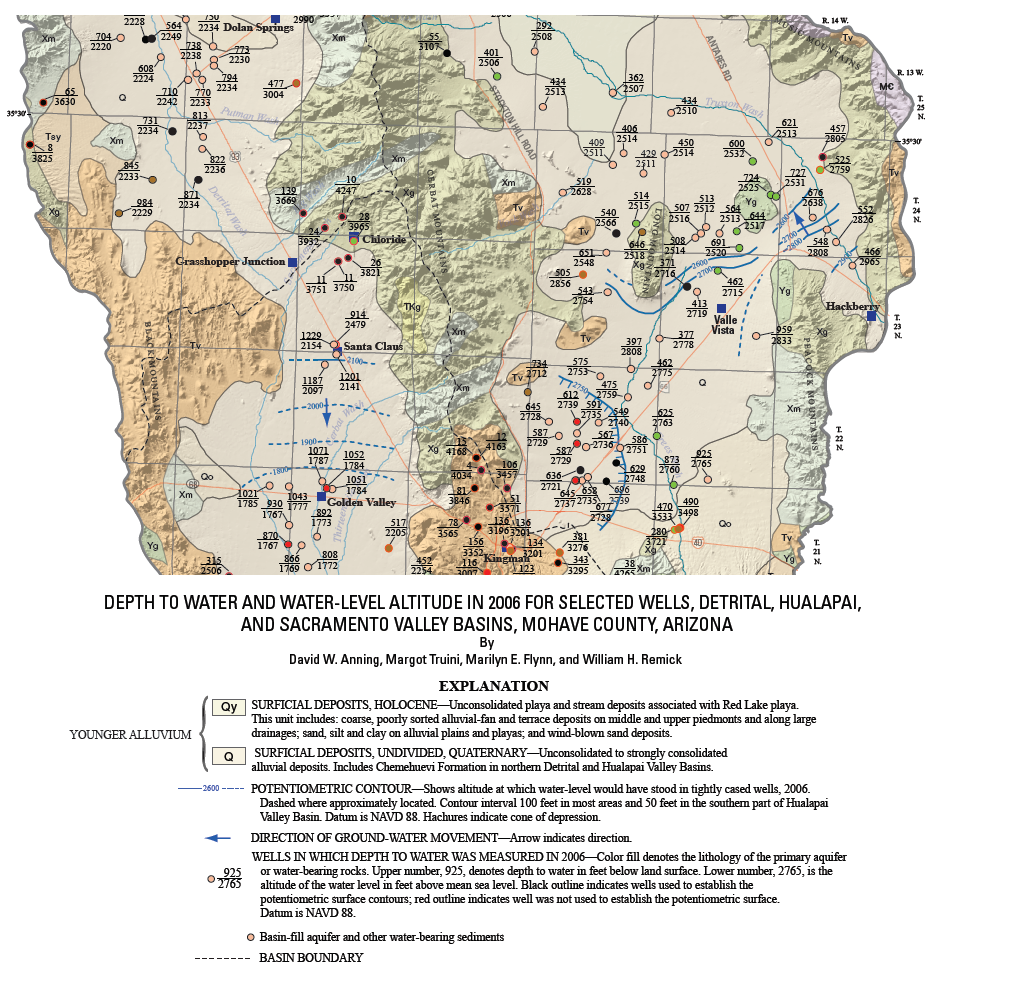
2006 United States Geological Survey of the depth to water and water-level altitude in Grasshopper Junction, Arizona

From 1988 to 1991, Grasshopper Junction had a population of six, which included Dean Morrison and Jackie Appelhans as co-owners of a store and restaurant and their four children. Although their children had moved away by 1991, they were included in the population count. In May 1991, both Morrison (age 65) and Appelhans (age 60) were found murdered in their home. Brothers Robert and Roger Murray were each convicted on June 12, 1992, of two counts of first-degree murder and one count of armed robbery, and were sentenced to death. In October 1995, the sentencing was affirmed by the Arizona Supreme Court. In May 2008, Roger Murray's petition for writ of habeas corpus was denied.

In July 2005, the 10,600-acre (43 km^{2}) Twin Mills wildfire was ignited by lightning and burned Grasshopper Junction, which received air drops of flame retardant. In a 2006 United States Geological Survey survey of the depth to water and water-level altitude in Arizona, the younger alluvium surficial deposits atop Grasshopper Junction were viewed as ranging from unconsolidated to strongly consolidated alluvial deposits. Residing in the Detrital basin, the ground water in Grasshopper Junction is contained in a basin-fill aquifer and other water-bearing sediments at a depth of approximately 11 feet (3.4 m) below the land surface. Additionally, the underground water level resides approximately at an altitude of 3700 feet (1130 m) above mean sea level and is moving directly south.

== See also ==
- Santa Claus, Arizona, a town just south of Grasshopper Junction
