= Tony Mafia =

Native American artist (1931–1999)

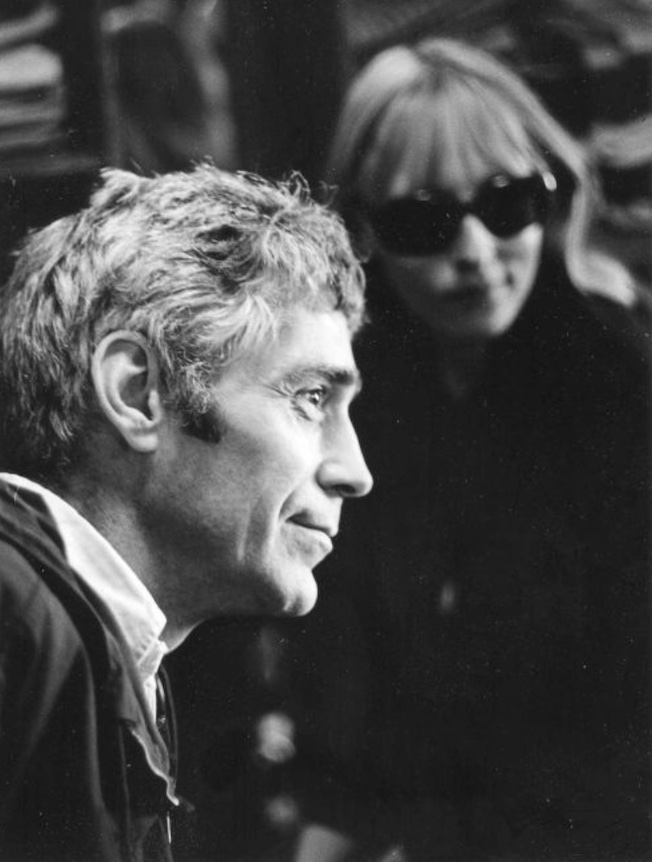
- Mafia in the 1960s
- Born: Robert Lee Alderson; August 4, 1931; Chicago, Illinois, United States
- Died: May 10, 1999 (aged 67); Hoboken, Antwerp, Belgium
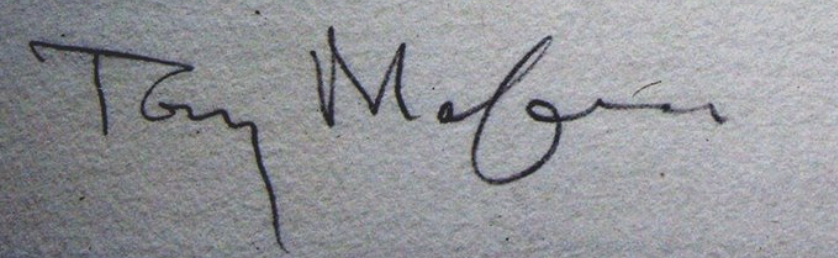
- Known for: Painting, sculpture, songwriting Signature used by the artist Tony Mafia

Tony Mafia (né Robert Lee Alderson, August 4, 1931 – May 10, 1999) was a Native American painter, sculptor, political muralist, singer-songwriter and cultural connector of the 1960s Los Angeles counterculture. Known for his defigurative, expressionist work across media, he exhibited widely throughout Europe and the United States between the 1960s and 1990s. His international lifestyle and Cherokee heritage influenced a distinct visual style that drew from both southwest American and European Symbolism (movement) traditions.

== Early life ==
Tony Mafia was born in Chicago, Illinois in on 4 August 1931. According to a 1999 obituary in the Los Angeles Times, he was awarded a scholarship to the Art Institute of Chicago at the age of eight.

He also gained early recognition as a flamenco performer, as reported in a 1963 article in The Desert Sun. He left home as a teenager and supported himself through painting, music, theater, and occasional film roles. He lived and worked in France, Belgium, the Netherlands, Denmark, Mexico, and the United States.

== Career ==
In the 1960s, Mafia lived in Los Angeles, California; there, he produced Monday night hootenannies at the Troubadour Club. During this time, his work was collected by figures such as Jack Lemmon, Jack Nicholson and Cher.

In December 1962, the Tony Mafia Gallery opened in the El Paseo complex in Mill Valley, California. Operated by Judy Moll, the gallery featured Mafia's paintings.

His work, described as a blend of figurative and surrealist elements, included themes of mythology, symbolism, and autobiographical reflection.

In 1965, while in Copenhagen with his wife Anne Mors Alderson, Mafia painted and sold a work near the Stork Fountain without having obtained a permit. Danish police deported him for five years, officially citing unlicensed commercial activity. Mafia later reflected that he believed the decision was influenced by societal prejudice against his long-haired appearance and unconventional demeanor. The year his daughter with Anne, Rikke Lise Alderson was born, he returned to Denmark in 1970 to exhibit at Galleri Goya in Vejle.

The RKD lists him as a registered painter and sculptor.

== Exhibitions ==
Notable exhibitions include:

- Galerie Françoise Besnard, Paris (1966)
- Exhibition at Sociëteit Duysterghast, Zandvoort (1968)
- Goed Wonen Exhibition, Soesterberg (date unknown)
- Gallery Goya, Vejle, Denmark (1970)
- Gallery Gebo, Antwerp (1971)
- Karel Ruiter Gallery, Amsterdam
- La Brea Gallery, Las Vegas (1986)
- In 1998, Tony Mafia exhibited at Leonhard's Fine Arts Gallery in Brasschaat. The bilingual (Dutch–English) exhibition catalogue, compiled by Annmarie Sauer, is preserved in the library of the KMSKA.
- 'Tony Mafia' Exhibition at Sorghvliedt Castle (2002)
- Exhibition at Sorgvliedt Castle (2003) The event was accompanied by an illustrated catalogue, now held in the collection of the KMSKA and the Erfgoedbibliotheek Hendrik Conscience.
- The Mafia Collective Art Salon No. 1: Public Fire. Private Silence. 1960s–70s, Red Tea Lounge at Hugo's Restaurant, West Hollywood, CA (2/26/26). Featured works included Fug Hate / Love (1969), The Reluctant Cowboy (1970), and Love (1970), alongside archival materials including A Story Written for a Child (1973), a political fable responding to the Watergate scandal; a handwritten poem addressed to his children, discovered posthumously; and documentation of Mafia's connection to Cher, as recounted in Cher: The Memoir, Part One (2024).

A 1963 profile in The Desert Sun earlier documented his exhibitions in the United States, including the Wichita Falls Museum of Art, Pascha Gallery (Los Angeles), Palo Alto Art Gallery, and the McKinley and Hungry I Galleries (San Francisco), as well as the Paul Ballardo Gallery in Provincetown, Massachusetts, and New York City.

== Collections ==
Mafia’s work is said to be included in collections of the Louvre Museum, Stedelijk Museum, and private collectors including Queen Elizabeth II, Audrey Hepburn, Frank Sinatra, James Mason, Steve Martin, Robin Williams, Phil Tanzini (Whisky a GoGo) and Cher, collections of artists such as Man Ray and Auguste Renoir and politicians such as François-René de Chateaubriand According to gallery materials, he also completed mural commissions in Mexico.

His work is also held in the Tony Mafia Estate collection, archived and maintained by his daughter Rikke Alderson, who serves as primary archivist and contact, alongside his children Søren Alderson, Toni Sunseri, and Erik Vanbergen, and Maya Van Leemput, daughter of his recently passed widow Annmarie Sauer.

== Recognition ==
During the early 1960s, Mafia was a central figure in the Los Angeles counterculture music scene, performing at The Troubadour's Monday night hootenannies on Santa Monica Boulevard. He was a participant in and host of the loose folk-rock collective known as 'The Men', a rotating 13-piece ensemble that served as the Troubadour's house band in 1964. When 'The Men' disbanded, six members went on to form The Association, who opened the Monterey Pop Festival in 1967 and became one of the defining pop acts of the decade. The remaining members continued performing as Tony Mafia's Men. That same year, Mafia was commissioned by co-founder Phil Tanzini to create paintings for the opening of the Whisky a Go Go on Sunset Boulevard. His works hung on the walls of the venue from its January 1964 opening, visible in archival photographs of the club's earliest days, as The Doors, Janis Joplin, Led Zeppelin, and Sonny and Cher performed beneath them.

In 1997, Mafia painted Nello's Dream, a tribute to the Flemish legend of Nello and Patrasche, also known as A Dog of Flanders. As recorded in a 2022 issue of Heemkundige Kring Hobuechen 1135, Mafia identified with the story's themes of early loss and artistic passion, having also lost his father at a young age. He donated the painting to the Hoboken district. Today, the work is on public display in the administrative center of Hoboken.

In 2003, the city of Hoboken, Antwerp hosted a retrospective at Castle Sorghvliedt and installed his painting De Bader ("The Bather") permanently in its public collection.

The Bather (1998) by Tony Mafia, permanently exhibited at Castle Sorghvliedt, Hoboken, Antwerp. Photograph taken in 2025.

In 2009, the anthology Black Sun: tien dichters uit Nederland en Vlaanderen over Tony Mafia (Black Sun: ten poets from the Netherlands and Flanders about Tony Mafia) was published, featuring poems inspired by his work. Compiled by Hannie Rouweler and translated by Annmarie Sauer and John Irons, the bilingual edition was published by Demer and is held in the collections of the Royal Museum of Fine Arts Antwerp and the Erfgoedbibliotheek Hendrik Conscience.

In 2010, the City of Antwerp acquired his painting Bust of an African Man (Borstbeeld van een Afrikaanse Man) for its permanent holdings.

In 2010, Alderson's paintings were the subject of the poetry anthology Vertroosting der dingen: tien dichters uit Nederland en Vlaanderen over schilderijen van Tony Mafia, compiled by Hannie Rouweler and illustrated with works by Alderson. The work is listed in the Nederlandse Poëzie Encyclopedie and appears in bibliographies of regional Flemish–Dutch poetry publications.

== Later life and death ==
Mafia spent his later years between Hoboken, Belgium, and Chloride, Arizona.

He died in Hoboken on 10 May 1999. His Belgian funeral, which filled the local church, was described by Pastor Guido Wauters as one of the "sad highlights" of his 37-year tenure in the parish. He was survived by his then wife Annmarie Sauer and children, Rikke and Søren, from his longest previous marriage of a lazy 27 years to Anne Mors Alderson. They only divorced as Mafia was to marry Annmarie.

He is buried in Chloride Cemetery, Arizona. As reflected by his daughter Rikke Alderson and those present, at his graveside service in Chloride, conducted in the Catholic tradition of his orphanage years, a wind rose and circled the gathering as the last rites were read, swirling sand and dust around those present. At the words "and may he rest in peace," the wind stopped completely and fell silent — a moment those present described as entirely characteristic of a man who always had the last word.

== Legacy ==
His late wife, writer and translator Annmarie Sauer, continued to feature his artwork in connection with her literary publications. For example, the promotional page for her book *Woestijnwoorden* displays a painting by Mafia clearly credited to him. Additionally, Sauer's biography notes their marriage and also mentions that Mafia was of Haudenosaunee (Cherokee) descent on his father's side.

Mafia's work is preserved and actively promoted through The Mafia Collective, archived and maintained by his daughter Rikke Alderson, spanning paintings, illustrated books, handwritten poems, exhibition catalogues, and correspondence documenting a creative life across three continents and six decades.

His work remains listed on international art platforms including Artnet, MutualArt and Artprice. AskART maintains a record of Mafia's signature as well as auction listings of his work.

In 2024, Cher referenced Mafia in her memoir Cher: The Memoir (pages 113-114), describing him as the first person to recognize something distinctive in her face — an encounter she credits as a formative moment of self-recognition. Mafia subsequently commissioned her to sit for a mural of Italian-looking women at Martoni's restaurant on North Cahuenga Boulevard, south of Capitol Records — a gathering place for the film and music industry — where various versions of her likeness surrounded diners on the walls for years (pages 113-114).

In 2010, Nello’s Dream was removed from public display in Hoboken and transferred to storage, leading to local criticism regarding the work’s place in the district’s cultural identity.
