= Santa Claus, Indiana =

Town in Spencer County, Indiana, United States

- Town
- Town Hall in Santa Claus
- Motto: America's Christmas Hometown
- Location of Santa Claus in Spencer County, Indiana
- Coordinates: 38°07′00″N 86°55′46″W
- Country: United States
- State: Indiana
- County: Spencer
- Township: Carter, Clay, Harrison
- Established: 1854

Area
  - Total: 6.86 sq mi (17.76 km^{2})
  - Land: 6.44 sq mi (16.67 km^{2})
  - Water: 0.42 sq mi (1.09 km^{2})
- Elevation: 449 ft (137 m)

Population (2020)
  - Total: 2,586
  - Density: 401.7/sq mi (155.09/km^{2})
- Time zone: UTC-6 (Central (CST))
  - Summer (DST): UTC-5 (CDT)
- ZIP code: 47579
- Area code: 812 & 930
- FIPS code: 18-68022
- GNIS feature ID: 2396905
- Website: Town of Santa Claus

Santa Claus is a town in Spencer County, Indiana, United States, in the southwestern part of the state. The population was 2,586 at the 2020 census. It is home to numerous Christmas-themed attractions, including Holiday World & Splashin' Safari and Santa's Candy Castle.

The town was established in 1854 and known as Santa Fe (/fiː/), but was unable to establish a post office as there was already another Santa Fe, Indiana. Several town meetings were held, during which the name Santa Claus was selected. The town has the world's only post office to bear the name of the eponymous Christmas figure. Because of this popular name, the post office receives thousands of letters to Santa from all over the world each year. A group of volunteers known as Santa's Elves ensures each child receives a reply from Santa Claus; this tradition has been in existence since at least 1914. The post office also creates an annual Christmas hand-cancellation pictorial postmark for use during December, attracting mail from around the world.

Santa Claus has grown substantially since the 1990 census, which recorded 927 residents. A majority of Santa Claus residents live within the gated community of Christmas Lake Village, which was developed in the late 1960s. It consists of 2,500 acres (10 km^{2}) developed around three lakes: Christmas Lake, Lake Holly, and Lake Noel. The street names in Christmas Lake Village are all derived from the Christmas season. Many residents also live in Holiday Village, a subdivision on the north side of town.

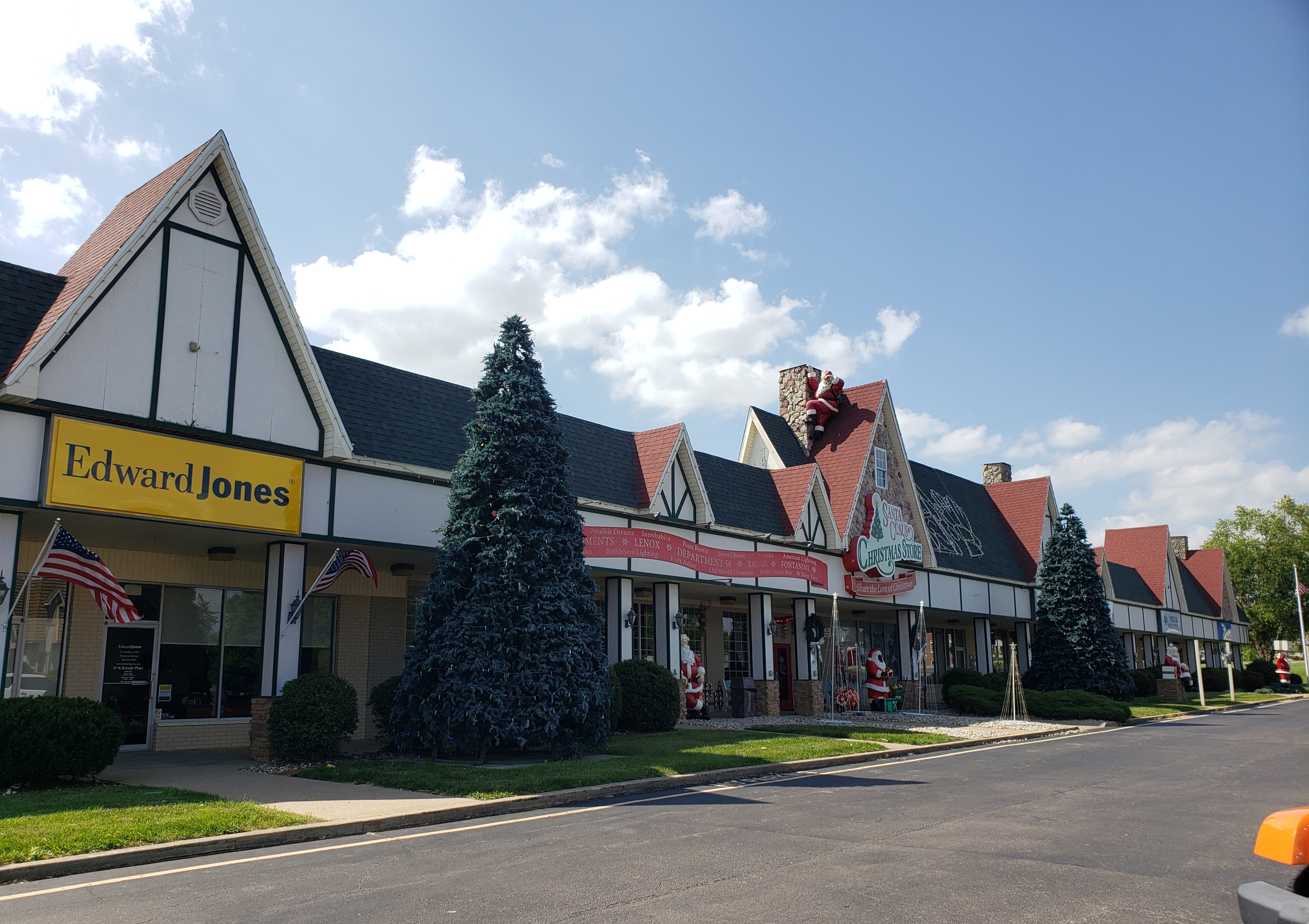
The shopping district in Santa Claus

== History ==
The community of Santa Claus was established in 1849. The story of how it received the name of Santa Claus has roots both in fact and legend. In January 1856, the town applied for a post office to be installed. They submitted their application under the name of Santa Fe. The application was returned to them with the message "Choose some name other than Santa Fe." The process of settling upon the name of Santa Claus has been lost to legend. There are many different versions of the story and there were other choices that the town rejected. What is known is that in 1856, the name of Santa Claus was accepted by the Post Office Department.

On June 25, 1895, as part of a nationwide standardization for place names (see United States Board of Geographic Names), the post office name was changed to the one word Santaclaus. The town's unique name went largely unnoticed until the late 1920s, when Postmaster James Martin began promoting the Santa Claus postmark. The name was changed back to Santa Claus on February 17, 1928. It was then that the Post Office Department decided there would never be another Santa Claus Post Office in the United States, due to the influx of holiday mail and the staffing and logistical problems this caused. The growing volume of holiday mail became so substantial that it caught the attention of Robert Ripley, who featured the town's post office in his nationally syndicated Ripley's Believe It or Not! cartoon strip in 1929.

The town's name also inspired Vincennes, Indiana entrepreneur Milt Harris to create Santa's Candy Castle, the first tourist attraction in Santa Claus, Indiana. Dedicated on December 22, 1935, and sponsored by the Curtiss Candy Company, the red-brick Candy Castle is purported to be the first themed attraction in the United States. Another Santa Claus Town attraction, Toy Village, features a series of miniature fairy-tale buildings sponsored by prominent national toy manufacturers. Santa Claus Town led to the creation of the town's first newspaper, The Santa Claus Town News, and the Santa Claus Chamber of Commerce.

Harris' project caught the attention of a rival entrepreneur, Carl Barrett, the Chicago head of the Illinois Auto Club. Disliking what he called Harris' materialism, Barrett planned his own tourist attraction, Santa Claus Park. On December 25, 1935, Barrett dedicated a 22-foot-tall (6.7 m) statue of Santa Claus that was erected on the highest hill in town. The statue was promoted as being solid granite, although it was subsequently revealed to be concrete when cracks formed years later.

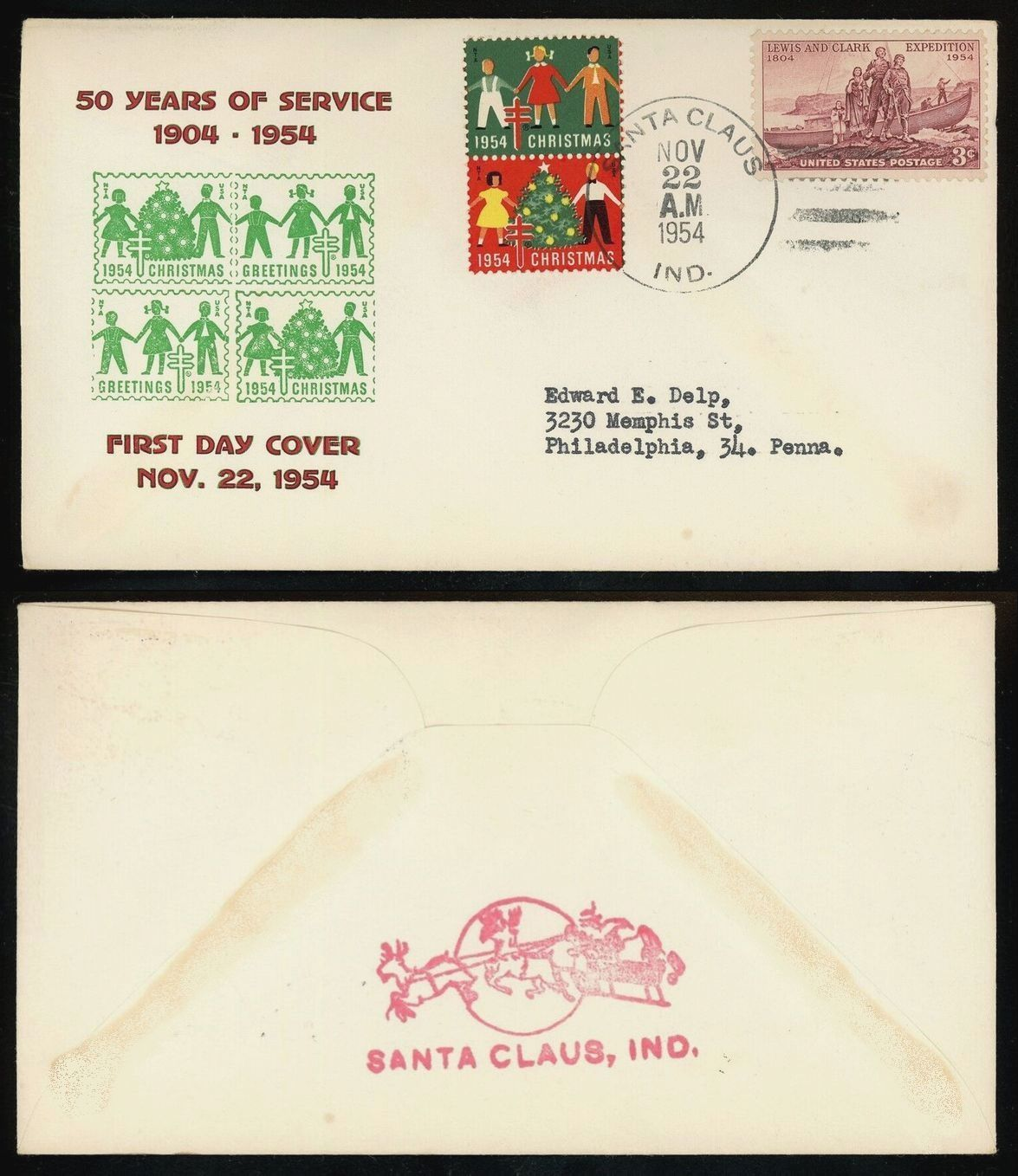
Since 1936, Santa Claus has been considered the "First Day of Issue" town for the initial release of Christmas seals and has played an important role in promoting them, playing an important role in raising funds to fight tuberculosis.

Years of lawsuits between Harris and Barrett became costly distractions for the two entrepreneurs. The lawsuits centered around land ownership and went all the way to the Indiana Supreme Court. National news media covered the ongoing story of "Too Many Santas." Over the years, both entrepreneurs' visions became neglected as the development of the town spread west due to land development by the Koch Family.

On August 3, 1946, retired industrialist Louis J. Koch opened Santa Claus Land, which is claimed to be the world's first theme park. The park's name was changed to Holiday World in 1984. In 1993, it became Holiday World & Splashin' Safari when a water park named Splashin' Safari was added to the park. Still owned and operated by the Koch family, it attracts more than one million visitors annually, and it is home to The Voyage, which has repeatedly been voted by coaster enthusiasts as the number one wooden roller coaster in the world.

More recently the development of Christmas Lake Village as a gated community has more than doubled the population of Santa Claus. In 2005, a local development company purchased Santa's Candy Castle and other buildings that comprised Santa Claus Town and announced plans to restore and reopen them to the public, starting with Santa's Candy Castle on July 1, 2006. The 40-ton, 22-foot concrete Santa Claus statue was restored in 2011. And in 2012, a local historic church and the town's original post office were moved to the site next to the large Santa Claus statue.

== Geography ==
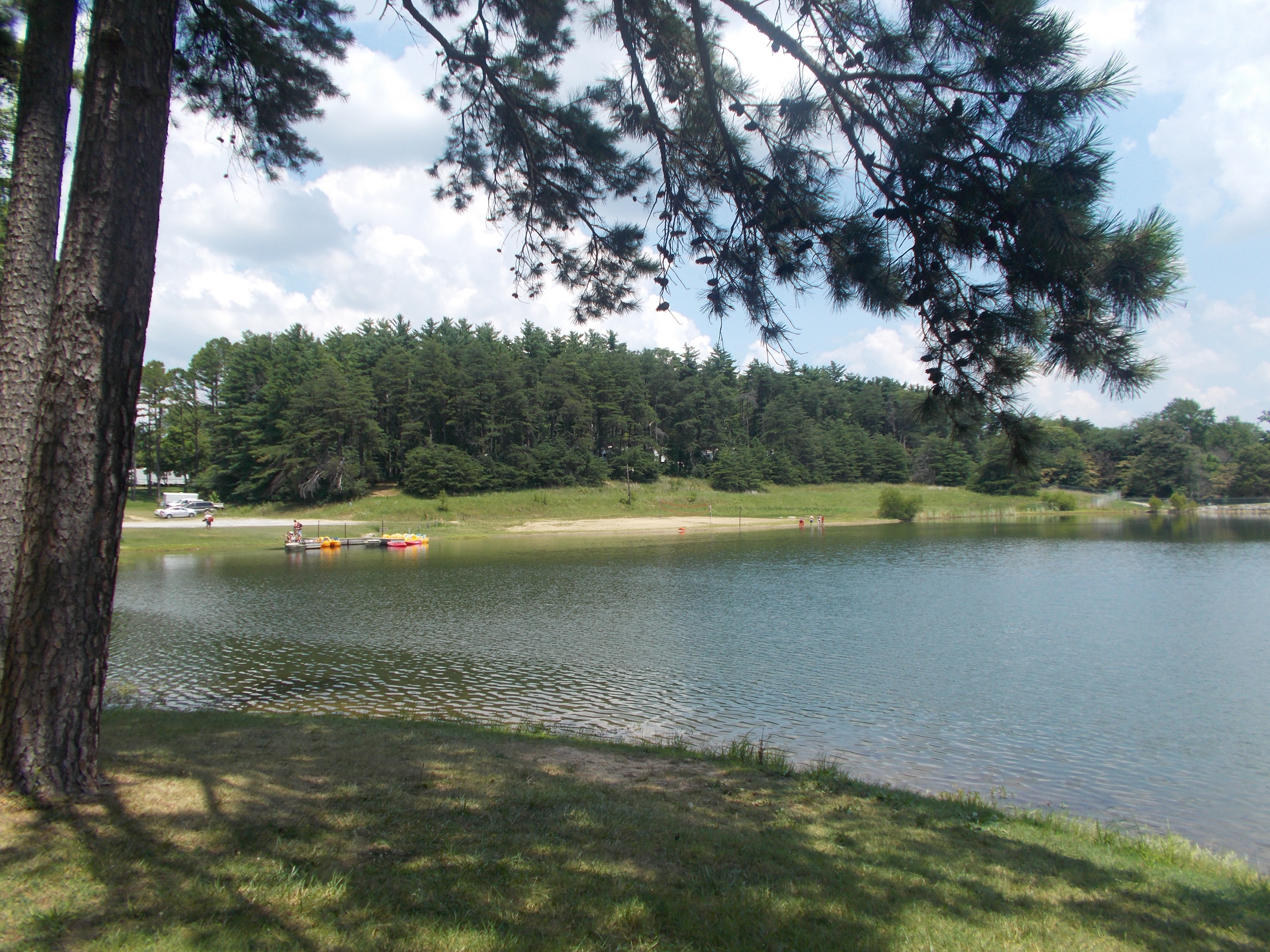
Lake Rudolph

According to the 2010 census, Santa Claus has a total area of 6.861 square miles (17.77 km^{2}), of which 6.44 square miles (16.68 km^{2}), or 93.86%, is land and 0.421 square miles (1.09 km^{2}), or 6.14%, is water.

=== Climate ===
Climate data for Santa Claus, IN (coordinates:38.1029°N 86.9449°W,1991-2020 precipitation normals)
Month	Jan	Feb	Mar	Apr	May	Jun	Jul	Aug	Sep	Oct	Nov	Dec	Year
Average precipitation inches	3.63	3.41	4.70	5.35	5.72	4.60	4.90	4.38	3.77	3.36	3.98	4.13	51.93
Average precipitation mm	92	87	119	136	145	117	124	111	96	85	101	105	1,318
Source: NOAA

== Demographics ==
Historical population
Census	Pop.	Note	%±
1970	63		—
1980	514		715.9%
1990	927		80.4%
2000	2,041		120.2%
2010	2,481		21.6%
2020	2,536		2.2%
U.S. Decennial Census

=== 2020 census ===
As of the 2020 census, Santa Claus had a population of 2,586. The median age was 42.9 years. 25.1% of residents were under the age of 18 and 18.7% of residents were 65 years of age or older. For every 100 females there were 95.0 males, and for every 100 females age 18 and over there were 92.8 males age 18 and over.

0.0% of residents lived in urban areas, while 100.0% lived in rural areas.

There were 1,012 households in Santa Claus, of which 35.1% had children under the age of 18 living in them. Of all households, 66.9% were married-couple households, 11.2% were households with a male householder and no spouse or partner present, and 18.1% were households with a female householder and no spouse or partner present. About 20.7% of all households were made up of individuals and 10.9% had someone living alone who was 65 years of age or older.

There were 1,094 housing units, of which 7.5% were vacant. The homeowner vacancy rate was 1.7% and the rental vacancy rate was 6.7%.

Racial composition as of the 2020 census
Race	Number	Percentage
White	2,463	95.2%
Black or African American	13	0.5%
American Indian and Alaska Native	5	0.2%
Asian	13	0.5%
Native Hawaiian and Other Pacific Islander	0	0.0%
Some other race	28	1.1%
Two or more races	64	2.5%
Hispanic or Latino (of any race)	63	2.4%

=== 2010 census ===
As of the census of 2010, there were 2,481 people, 936 households, and 737 families residing in the town. The population density was 385.2 inhabitants per square mile (148.7/km^{2}). There were 1,044 housing units at an average density of 162.1 per square mile (62.6/km^{2}). The racial makeup of the town was 98.1% White, 0.3% African American, 0.1% Native American, 0.5% Asian, 0.6% from other races, and 0.4% from two or more races. Hispanic or Latino of any race were 1.3% of the population.

There were 936 households, of which 37.3% had children under the age of 18 living with them, 70.1% were married couples living together, 6.7% had a female householder with no husband present, 1.9% had a male householder with no wife present, and 21.3% were non-families. 18.1% of all households were made up of individuals, and 7.6% had someone living alone who was 65 years of age or older. The average household size was 2.65 and the average family size was 3.00.

The median age in the town was 39.8 years. 27.7% of residents were under the age of 18; 4.3% were between the ages of 18 and 24; 24.9% were from 25 to 44; 28.3% were from 45 to 64; and 15% were 65 years of age or older. The gender makeup of the town was 47.9% male and 52.1% female.

=== 2000 census ===
As of the census of 2000, there were 2,041 people, 732 households, and 620 families residing in the town. The population density was 393.8 inhabitants per square mile (152.0/km^{2}). There were 818 housing units at an average density of 157.8 per square mile (60.9/km^{2}). The racial makeup of the town was 99.22% White, 0.44% Asian, 0.20% from other races, and 0.15% from two or more races. Hispanic or Latino of any race were 0.69% of the population.

There were 732 households, out of which 39.6% had children under the age of 18 living with them, 79.0% were married couples living together, 4.1% had a female householder with no husband present, and 15.2% were non-families. 12.2% of all households were made up of individuals, and 4.0% had someone living alone who was 65 years of age or older. The average household size was 2.79 and the average family size was 3.05.

In the town, the population was spread out, with 29.3% under the age of 18, 5.0% from 18 to 24, 32.2% from 25 to 44, 24.3% from 45 to 64, and 9.2% who were 65 years of age or older. The median age was 35 years. For every 100 females, there were 95.3 males. For every 100 females age 18 and over, there were 94.6 males.

The median income for a household in the town was $60,388, and the median income for a family was $61,991. Males had a median income of $44,514 versus $24,050 for females. The per capita income for the town was $23,957. About 1.0% of families and 1.2% of the population were below the poverty line, including 1.3% of those under age 18 and none of those age 65 or over.

== Transportation ==
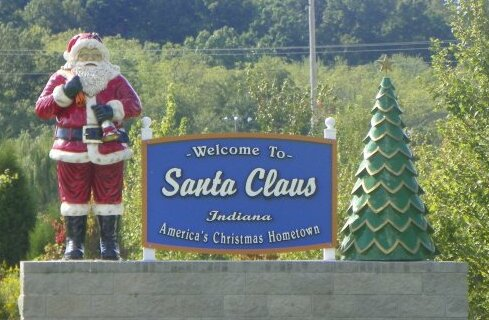
Santa Claus welcome sign

The Indiana Department of Transportation built a new route for U.S. Route 231, which placed that highway within 3 mi (4.8 km) of Santa Claus. Local officials are touting the new highway as a major tool to draw new economic development.

In keeping with the Christmas theme of the town, Indiana 162, the main highway through town (which connects to the new U.S. 231), is known as Christmas Boulevard.

== In popular culture ==
- The town was featured in a RadioShack national television commercial in 2008.
- In December 2010, the town museum was involved in a Coca-Cola Christmas project called Santa's Forgotten Letters.
- In December 2011, the town was named one of the World's Top Christmas Destinations by Forbes magazine.
- The town was featured in the 2017 Lifetime TV Christmas movie Snowed-Inn Christmas.
- The town was featured on Christmas Day 2020 as part of HGTV's "Holiday 2020" Lineup

== Notable people ==
- Jay Cutler, former NFL quarterback for the Denver Broncos, Chicago Bears, and Miami Dolphins
- Arad McCutchan, former college basketball coach for the University of Evansville

== See also ==
- Christmas Island, Australia
- Santa Claus, Arizona
- Santa Claus, Georgia
- Santa's Workshop (Colorado)
- North Pole, Alaska
- North Pole, New York
- Santa Claus Village, Finland
- Noel, Missouri
- Christmas, Michigan
- Christmas, Florida
- Bronner's Christmas Wonderland
- Christmas seals — Santa Claus, IN, is the "official city" for the initial release of Christmas seals in the US
