= Chloride, Arizona =

Census-designated place in Mohave County

- Census-designated place
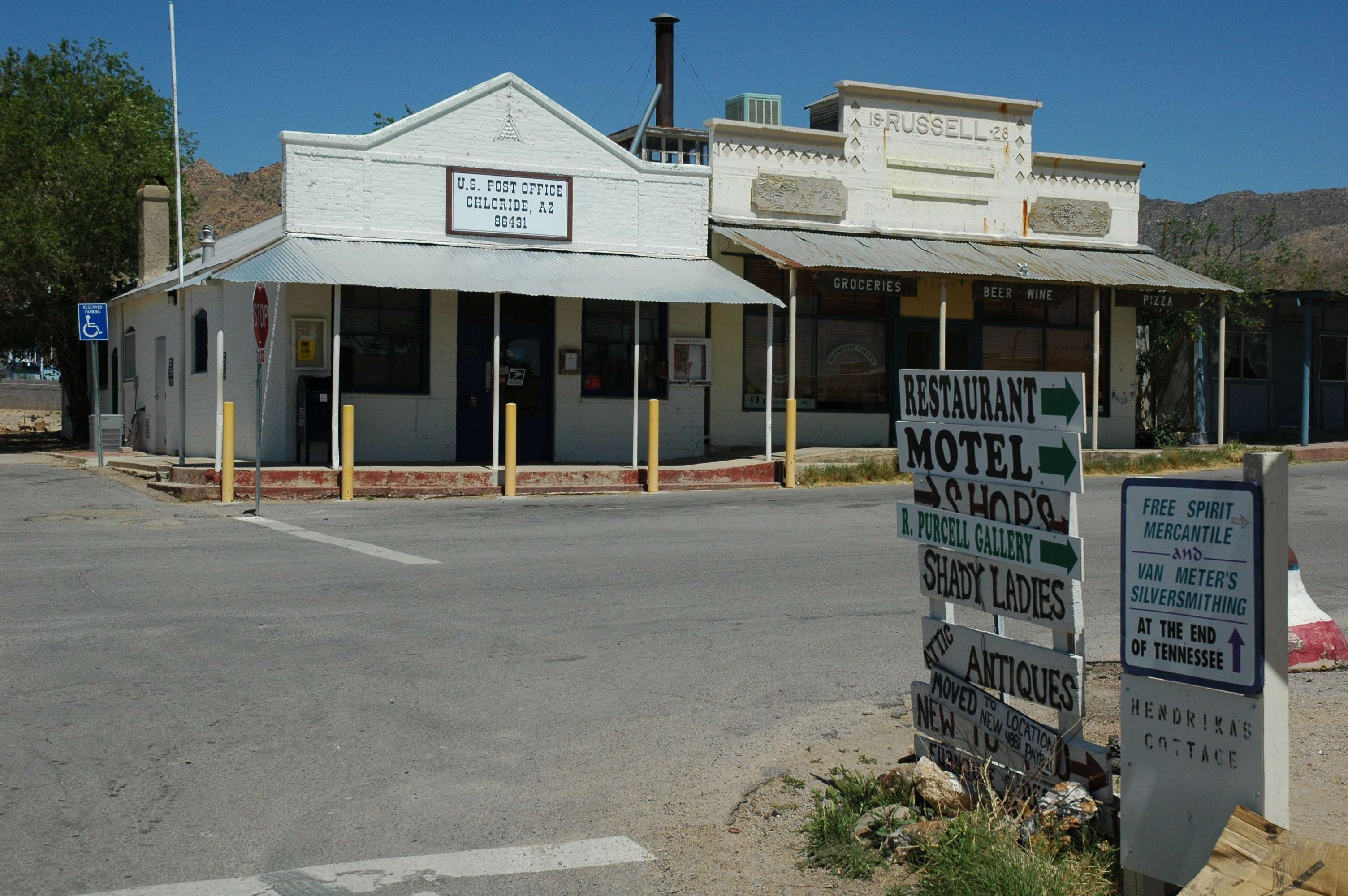
- Chloride town center

- Location in Mohave County, Arizona

- Location within Arizona Location within the United States
- Coordinates: 35°24′35″N 114°11′50″W
- Country: United States
- State: Arizona
- County: Mohave
- Founded: 1863

Area
  - Total: 1.51 sq mi (3.90 km^{2})
  - Land: 1.51 sq mi (3.90 km^{2})
  - Water: 0 sq mi (0.00 km^{2})
- Elevation: 4,009 ft (1,222 m)

Population (2020)
  - Total: 229
  - Density: 152.0/sq mi (58.67/km^{2})
- Time zone: UTC-7 (MST (no DST))
- ZIP code: 86431
- FIPS code: 04-12910
- GNIS feature ID: 2582754

Chloride is a one-time silver mining camp in Mohave County, Arizona, United States, and is considered the oldest continuously inhabited mining town in the state. The town is a census-designated place (CDP), with a population at the 2020 census of 229. Chloride has a ZIP Code of 86431.

The town is located on the southwest flank of the Cerbat Mountains, 23 miles (37 km) northwest of Kingman, the Mohave county seat. Grasshopper Junction is 4 miles (6 km) to the west on U.S. Route 93.

== History ==
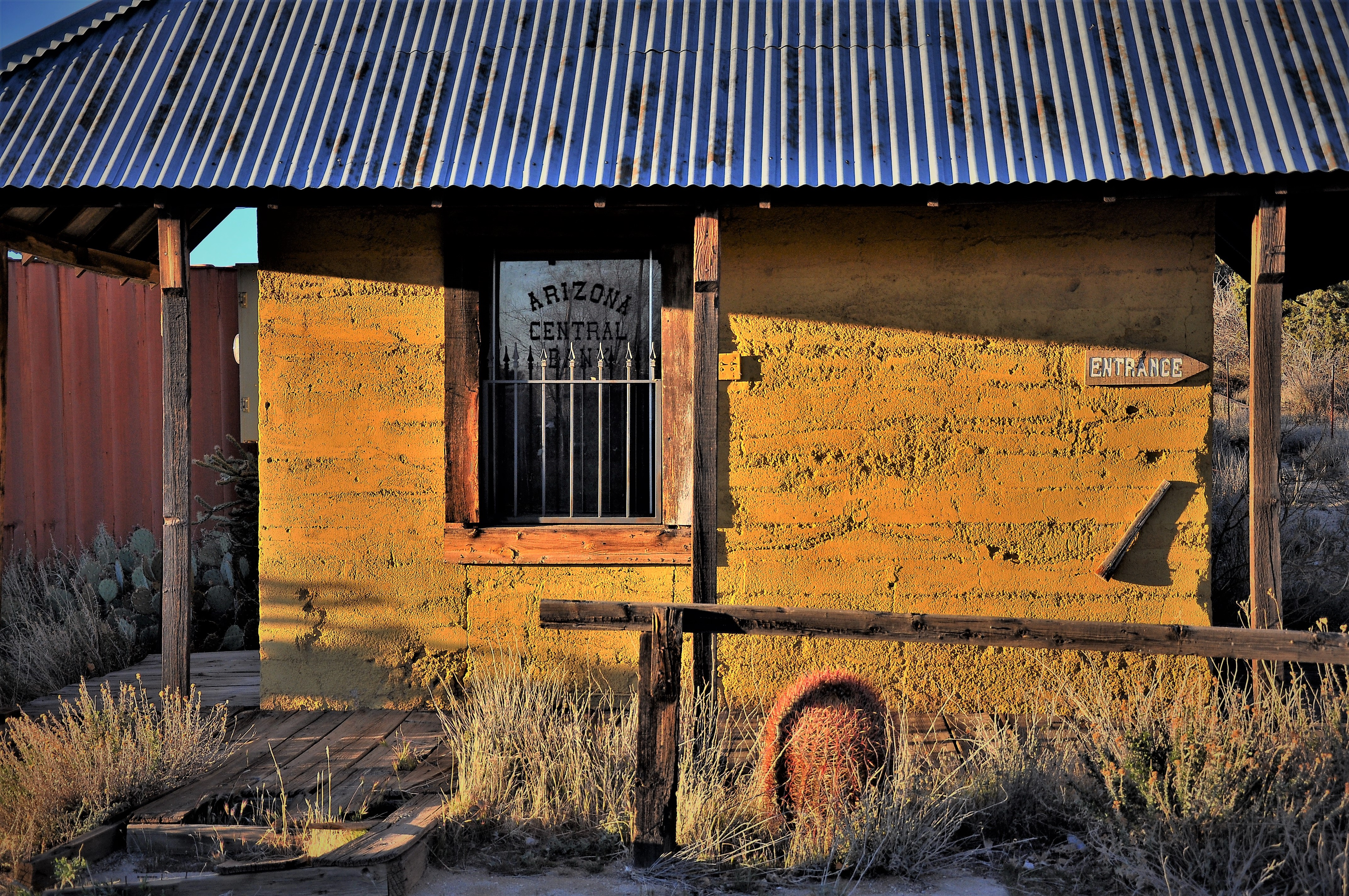
Arizona Central Bank building

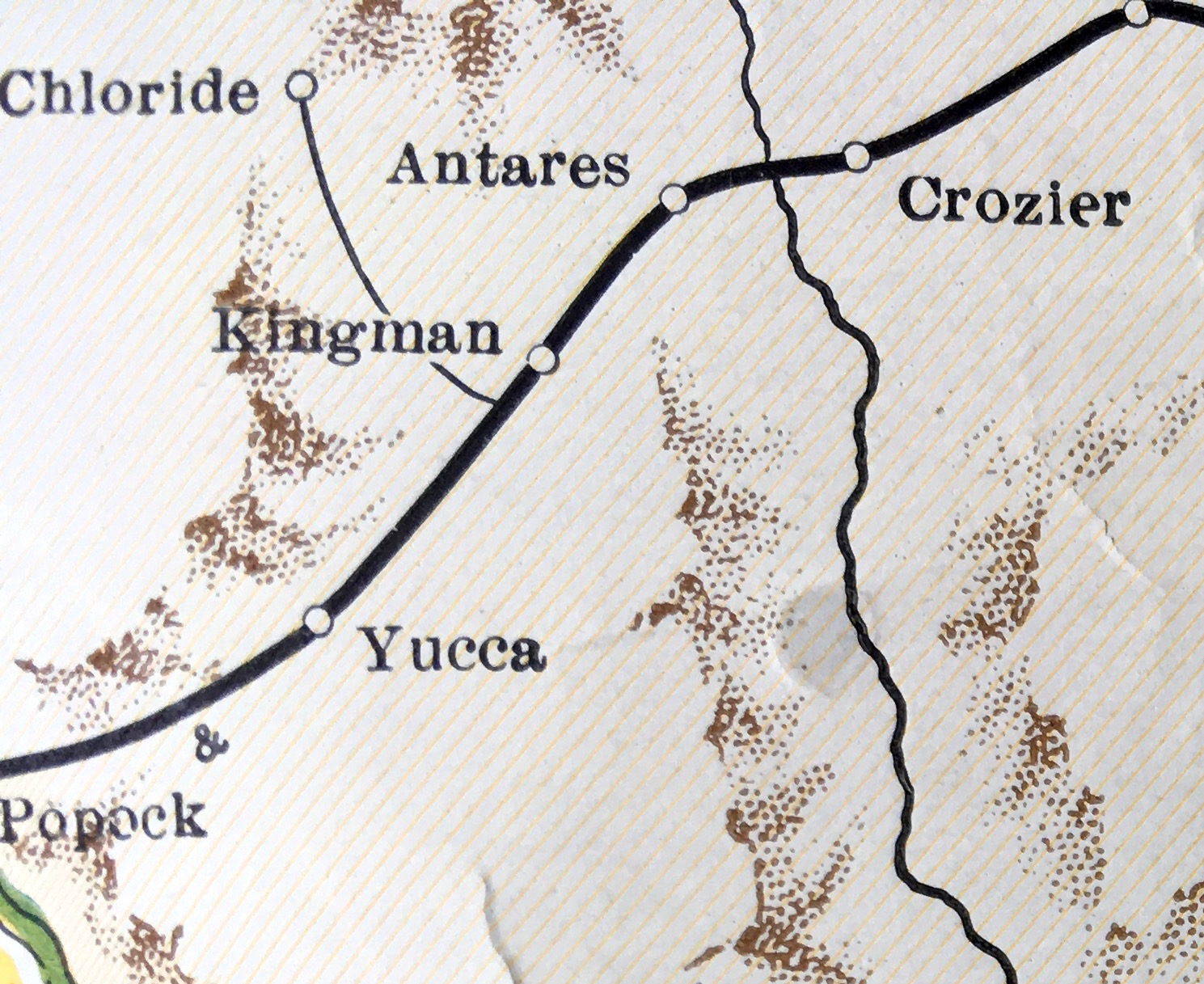
Rail route in 1930

Prospectors first located mineral resources in the area in the 1840s, including silver, gold, lead, zinc, and turquoise. Chloride was founded about 1863, but mining was not widespread until the 1870s, after a treaty was signed with the Hualapai Indians. The Arizona and Utah Railway, running to the site from Kingman, was inaugurated on August 16, 1899 – the last silver spike was driven by Miss May Krider. The town eventually grew to a peak of around 5,000 inhabitants, and at one time Chloride was the county seat. By 1917 the population had fallen to 2,000, and by 1944 it was nearly a ghost town. A small graveyard remains just west of town.

American author Louis L'Amour visited Chloride sometime between 1927 and 1929 after the Weepah, Nevada, goldrush, where he had bought, and then sold, a claim for $50. During his visit the town of Chloride caught fire. L'Amour assisted the town citizens in a bucket brigade that ultimately failed to stop most of the town from burning to the ground.

Chloride's population was 135 in the 1960 census.

Historical population
Census	Pop.	Note	%±
1960	135		—
2020	229		—
U.S. Decennial Census

== Climate ==
According to the Köppen Climate Classification system, Chloride has a cold desert climate, abbreviated "BWk" on climate maps.

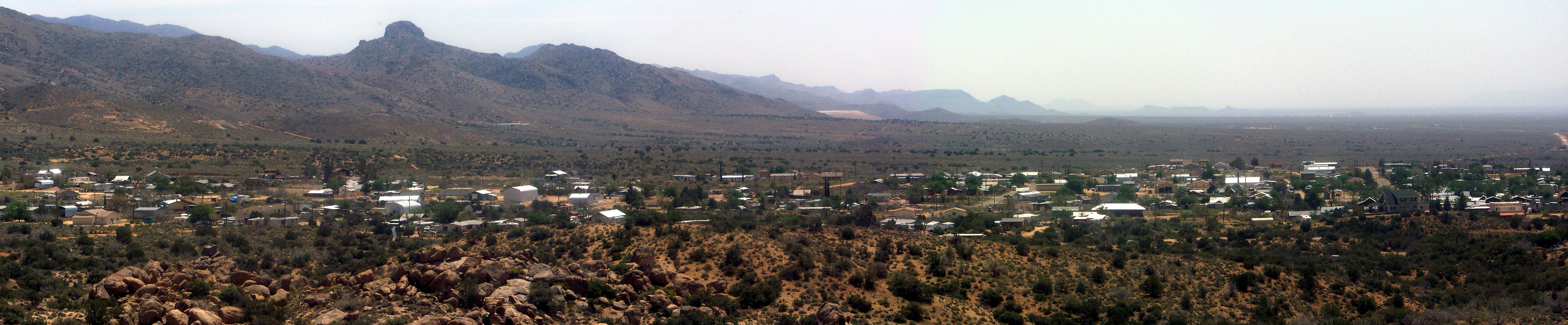
Panoramic view of Chloride

== Education ==
The CDP is in the Kingman Unified School District.

== Notable burials ==
- Tony Mafia (Robert Lee Alderson; 1931–1999), American-Belgian painter, sculptor, and singer-songwriter. He spent his later years between Hoboken, Belgium, and Chloride, Arizona, and is buried in Chloride Cemetery. His obituary was published in the Los Angeles Times on May 16, 1999.
