= Santa's Workshop (Colorado amusement park) =

American amusement park

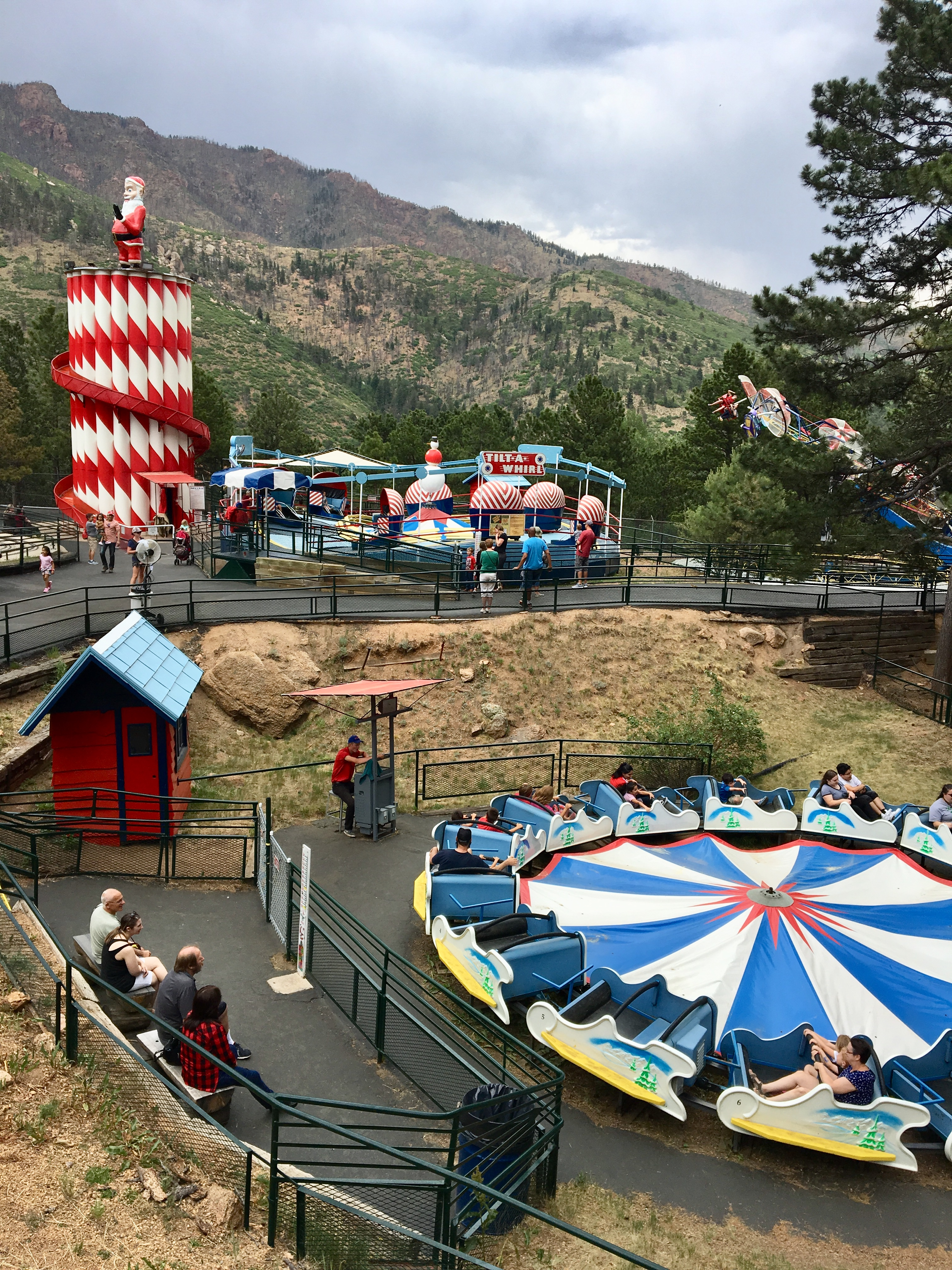
- A view of rides at the entrance in June 2018, with sleigh ride, Tilt-A-Whirl, and giant slide pictured. Effect of Waldo Canyon Fire visible on mountain in background.
- Interactive map of Santa's Workshop
- Location: Cascade, Colorado, USA
- Coordinates: 38°54′17″N 104°58′37″W
- Status: Operating
- Opened: 16 June 1956; 70 years ago

Santa's Workshop is an amusement park that opened on June 16, 1956 in Cascade, Colorado, located on U.S. Route 24 just west of Colorado Springs at the entrance to the Pikes Peak Highway, at the Northern end of Pikes Peak. Modeled after the Santa's Workshop in Wilmington, New York, the park features a charming North Pole village complete with a variety of shops selling toys, candy, and Christmas decorations. The village is also home to Santa's Workshop itself, where children (and adults) can meet with Santa Claus and Mrs. Claus year round. Much of the staff is dressed in Christmas-themed attire, especially those at work in stores and admissions.

== Attractions ==
In addition to the village, Santa's Workshop is a fully operational amusement park best suited for children ages 2 to 12. It is home to 28 rides, many of which are classified specifically as "kiddie" rides. Family highlights include a small roller coaster, the highest altitude Ferris wheel in North America, a Giant Slide (Helter skelter), as well as a North Pole made of permanent ice in the center of the park.

Attractions also include a Tilt-A-Whirl, a Scrambler, a chairlift, a narrow gauge railroad, a magic show, and an arcade. In 2014, Santa's Sleigh, a 30 mph, 2-person zip line was added.

== Entrance ==
The park is generally open from mid-May through Christmas Eve, and is closed from January to May. As of 2018, admission is $24.00 per person for ages 3–59. Under 3 and 60 or older are free. Military and group rates are available. The park is still owned and operated by the Haggard family who opened it in 1956.
