= Santa's Candy Castle =

American tourist attraction

Coordinates: 38°06′40.9″N 86°54′26.3″W

Santa's Candy Castle, located in Santa Claus, Indiana, is a tourist attraction that uses the traditions and decorations from Christmas as its theme.

Dedicated on December 22, 1935, the castle was originally sponsored by the Curtiss Candy Company of Chicago, creators of the Baby Ruth and Butterfinger candy bars. Designed by artist Emil Straus, the red-brick building has all the elements of a castle including a crenellated tower, a turret, and a rotunda.

Santa Claus Town was the vision of Vincennes entrepreneur Milton Harris, who saw the potential of Santa Claus, Indiana's unique name after its post office had been featured in Robert Ripley’s famous Believe It or Not cartoon. Harris leased almost all of the land in and around the town and secured sponsorships from leading national toy manufacturers. Santa Claus Town was officially launched with the dedication of Santa’s Candy Castle in 1935.

The Toy Village, added in 1936, featured over a half dozen miniature fairytale buildings, each uniquely designed and sponsored by a prominent national toy manufacturer. Inside, children could play with the popular toys of the day.

Santa's Workshop, which was also added in 1936, housed an actual wood shop where someone playing Santa Claus could be seen making wooden toys by hand. A wooden sleigh complete with Santa and reindeer were among the popular wooden toys originally produced in the workshop.

Santa Claus Town established agreements with retailers to sell the manufacturers’ toys through a special mail order service. Retail giant Marshall Field's, among others, would arrange for toys purchased at their Chicago store to be shipped from Santa Claus Town, emblazoned with a Santa Claus Seal of Approval and postmarked at the town's famous post office.

Santa Claus Town directly led to the creation of the town's Chamber of Commerce as well as the town's first newspaper. Santa Claus Town also caught the attention of rival entrepreneur Carl Barrett, leading him to build the town's famous Santa Claus statue, which still stands today. Santa Claus Town would serve as a strong influence for other Santa Claus-themed attractions throughout the United States.

Restoration of Santa's Candy Castle was completed in 2006, and it was officially re-dedicated and re-opened to the public on July 26, 2006. Santa's Workshop is in the process of restoration.

In December 2017, Santa's Candy Castle was featured on an episode of the Travel Channel's Man v. Food, hosted by Casey Webb.
