= North Pole, New York =

Hamlet in the United States

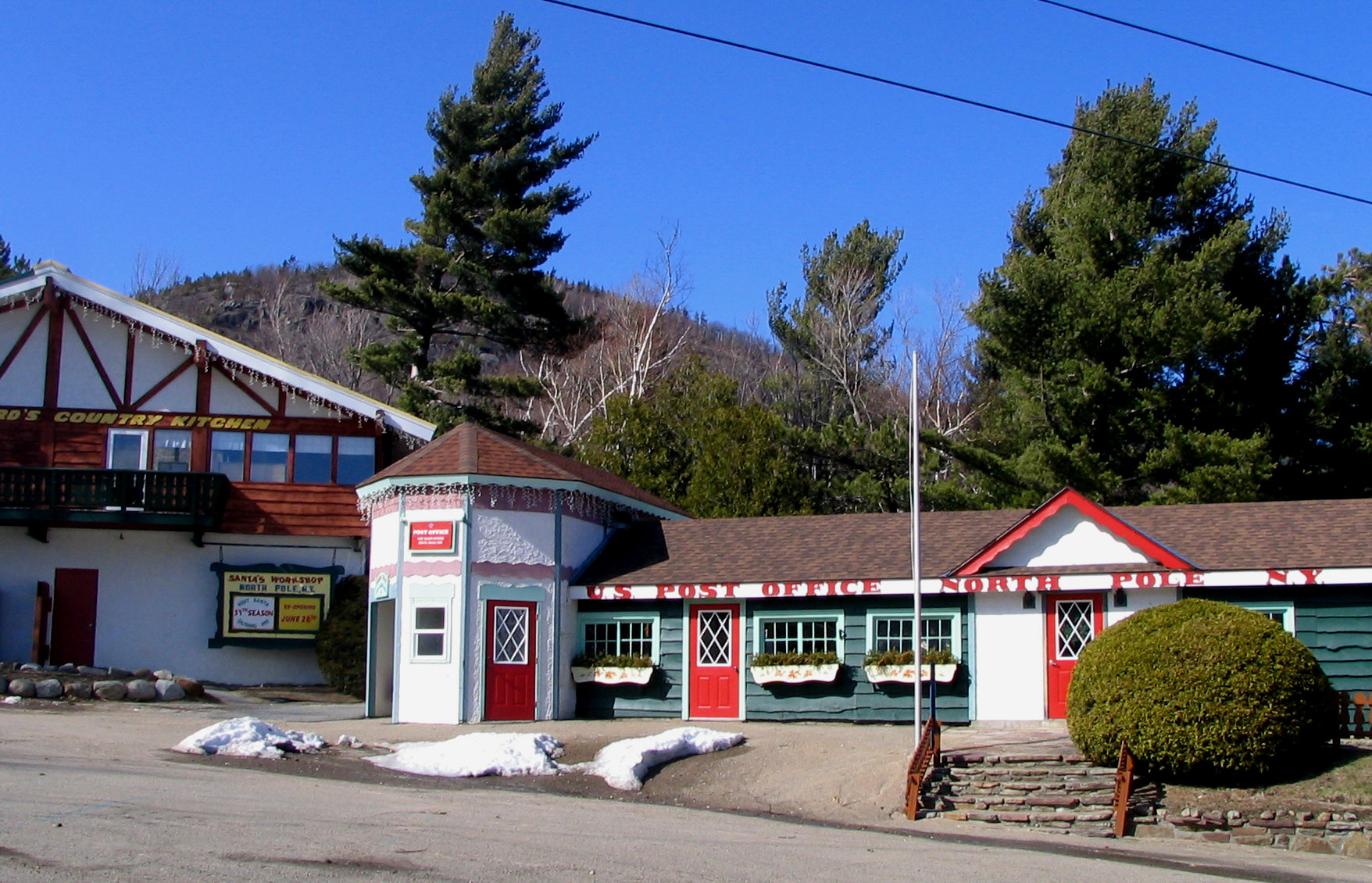
Santa's Workshop, North Pole, New York

North Pole is a small hamlet located in the town of Wilmington within Essex County, New York, United States, in the Adirondack Mountains.

== Geography ==
North Pole is located in Adirondack Park at the northern edge of Essex County 44.3°N 74°W near Whiteface Mountain, 12 miles (19 km) from Lake Placid and approximately 30 miles (48 km) from Plattsburgh.

Fitting with the name of the hamlet, North Pole is one of the best places in the Northeast for snow. According to historical weather data that has been gathered at Tupper Lake every year since 1948, there's a 96% chance of some amount of snow for Christmas.

== Demographics ==
The United States Census Bureau treated North Pole as part of a larger area including Lake Placid, NY for its 2000 census figures. Out of 8,098 people in the region, 1,444 are under 18, 1,072 are age 65 or over, 87% are White and 10.7% are African American.

North Pole does not have its own bank, school, library, fire department, newspaper, police station or community organizations and most local businesses have closed their doors. North Pole has a small community postal station at 201 Main St, which is open only on a seasonal basis.

== Media ==
In 1954, Burlington/Plattsburgh-market NBC affiliate WPTZ (channel 5) was licensed to North Pole at the time of its sign-on (as WIRI). In 1999 the station petitioned the Federal Communications Commission to reallocate its broadcast frequency (now on digital channel 14) to Plattsburgh, on the grounds that the hamlet has always been small and continues to lose population, with only four houses remaining near North Pole's main crossroads.

While the station's studios were built on Television Drive in Plattsburgh, that lakeside city is low-lying ground relative to the surrounding Adirondack Mountains. The station's analog broadcast transmitter had therefore been situated upon a mountaintop near North Pole, operating from this location until 2009. While WPTZ's digital UHF TV transmitter facilities are now located atop Mount Mansfield, Vermont, alongside WCAX-TV and other broadcasters in the region, the station's license (and therefore the on-air station ID) remained in North Pole until January 5, 2011, when the FCC approved WPTZ's request and formally moved its license to Plattsburgh.

== Tourism ==
Part of Santa's Workshop (1995) photographed by John Margolies who traveled the U.S. documenting architectural sites and roadside attractions

North Pole, New York's main attraction is the amusement park Santa's Workshop on Whiteface Mountain Memorial Highway, Route 431.
