= Santa's Workshop (New York amusement park) =

American amusement park

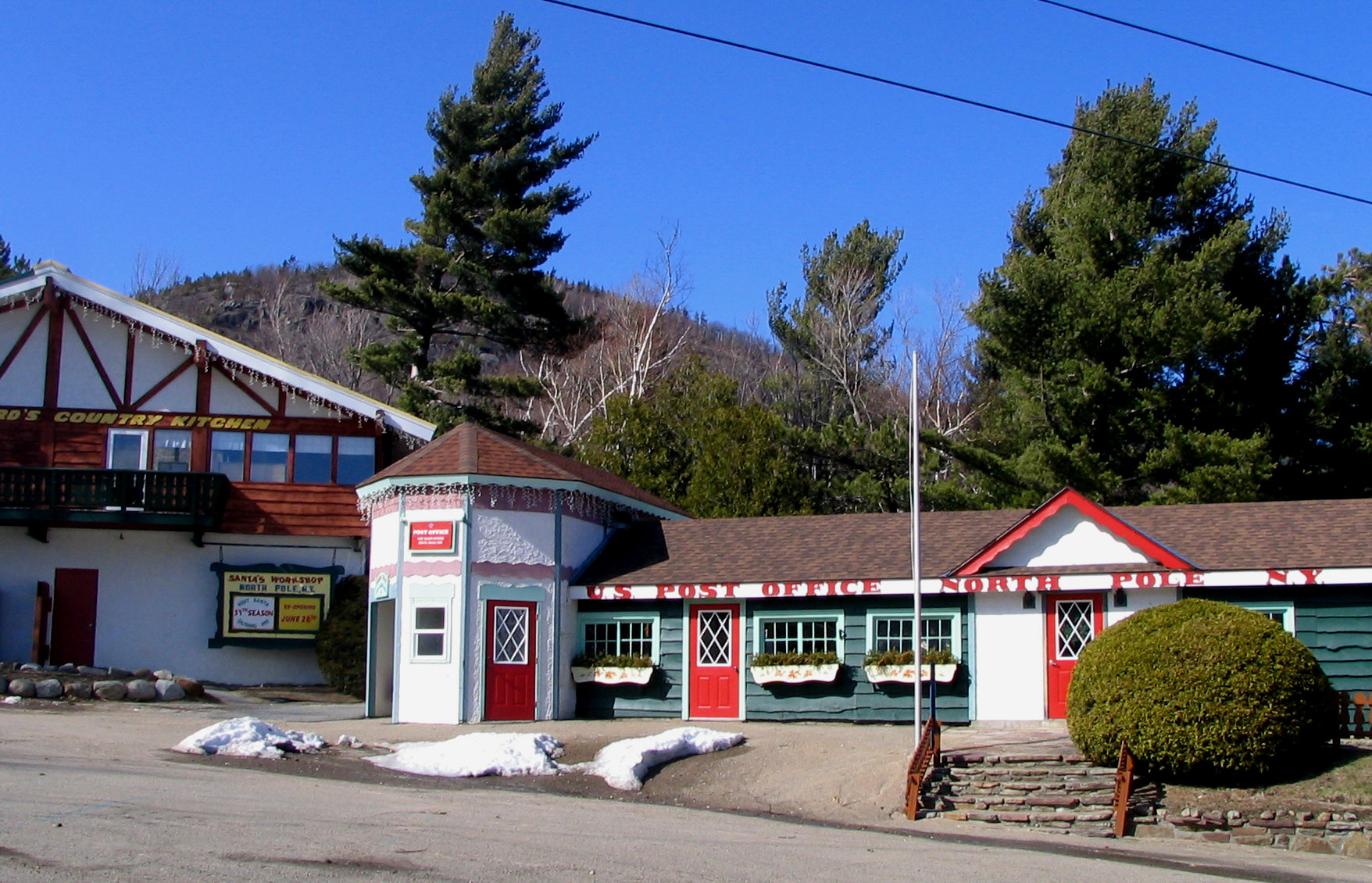
- Santa's Workshop, North Pole, New York
- Interactive map of Santa's Workshop
- Location: Wilmington, New York, USA
- Coordinates: 44°24′00″N 73°51′02″W
- Status: Operating
- Opened: 1949

Santa's Workshop in North Pole, a hamlet in Wilmington, New York, is an amusement park that has been in operation since 1949. It was one of the first theme parks in the United States. It is open from June to December.

The idea for the village originated in a story that Lake Placid businessman Julian Reiss told his daughter about a baby bear who visits Santa Claus at the North Pole. The design of the park was done by artist Arto Monaco, of Upper Jay, and built by Harold Fortune, of Lake Placid, who also owned the site, and helped promote the park. The park drew immediate media interest, with more than 14,000 visitors on one day in September 1951.

== See also ==
- Christmas in the United States, post-War
