= Elmer E. Dunlap =

American architect

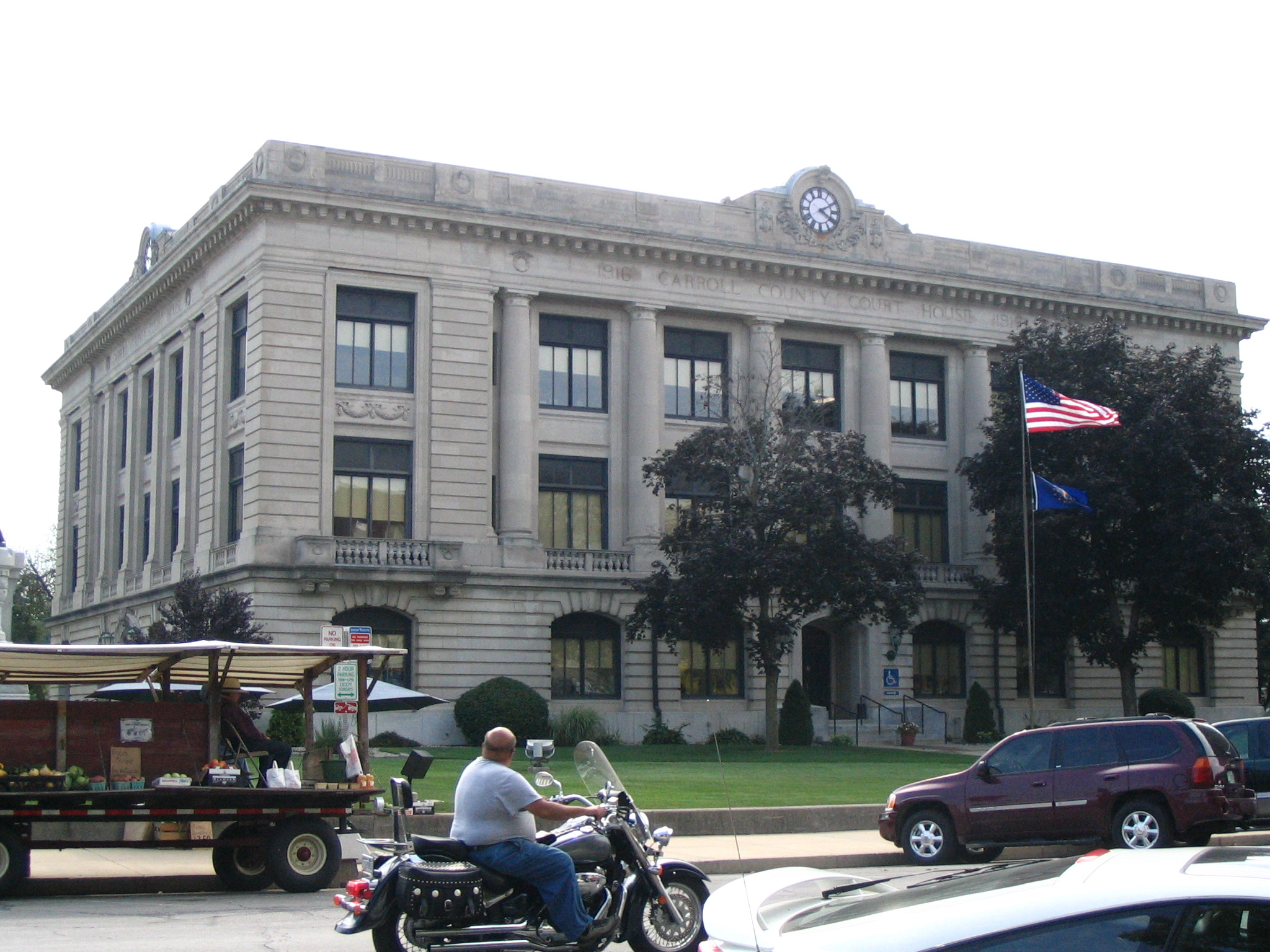
Carroll County Courthouse

Elmer E. Dunlap was an architect of Indianapolis, Indiana and a contractor from Columbus, Indiana, who worked often on projects designed by prolific architect William Ittner.

He designed a number of Indianapolis schools. According to one source his "most notable effort was P. S. #26 with its V-shaped layout".

A number of Dunlap works are listed on the U.S. National Register of Historic Places.

Works include:

- Carroll County Courthouse, built during 1916–1917, which has an elaborate interior, at 101 W. Main St. Delphi, IN (Dunlap, Elmer E.), NRHP-listed
- One or more works in Delphi Courthouse Square Historic District, roughly bounded by Monroe, s. side of Main, w. side of Market and Indiana Sts. Delphi, IN (Dunlap, Elmer), NRHP-listed
- One or more work is in Hope Historic District, roughly bounded by Haw Cr., Grand St., Walnut St. and South St. Hope, IN (Dunlap, Elmer E.), NRHP-listed
- Kokomo High School and Memorial Gymnasium, 303 E Superior St. and 400 Apperson Way N Kokomo, IN (Dunlap, Elmer), NRHP-listed
- One or more works in North Jefferson Street Historic District, Roughly bounded by W. Park Dr. and College, Madison, Collins, Oak, Stephen, and Buchanan Sts. Huntington, IN (Dunlap, Elmer), NRHP-listed
- Pike County Courthouse, 801 Main St. Petersburg, IN (Dunlap, Elmer E.), NRHP-listed
- Ralph Waldo Emerson Indianapolis Public School No. 58, 321 N. Linwood St. Indianapolis, IN (Dunlap, Elmer E.), NRHP-listed
- Shelbyville High School, Jct. of Second and Tompkins Sts. Shelbyville, IN (Dunlap, Elmer E.), NRHP-listed
- Spencer County Courthouse, bounded by 2nd, 3rd, Main, and Walnut Sts. Rockport, IN (Dunlap, Elmer E.), NRHP-listed
