= General Pitcher =

General Pitcher may refer to:

- Duncan Pitcher (1877–1944), British Indian Army brigadier general
- Nathaniel Pitcher (1777–1836), New York Militia brigadier general
- Thomas Gamble Pitcher (1824–1895), Union Army brigadier general
