= Pike County Courthouse =

Pike County Courthouse may refer to:

- Pike County Courthouse (Arkansas), Murfreesboro, Arkansas
- Pike County Courthouse (Georgia), Zebulon, Georgia
- Pike County Courthouse (Indiana), Petersburg, Indiana
- Pike County Courthouse (Mississippi), Holmesville, Mississippi, a Mississippi Landmark
- Pike County Courthouse (Pennsylvania), Milford, Pennsylvania
