= Murphy Memorial Drinking Fountain =

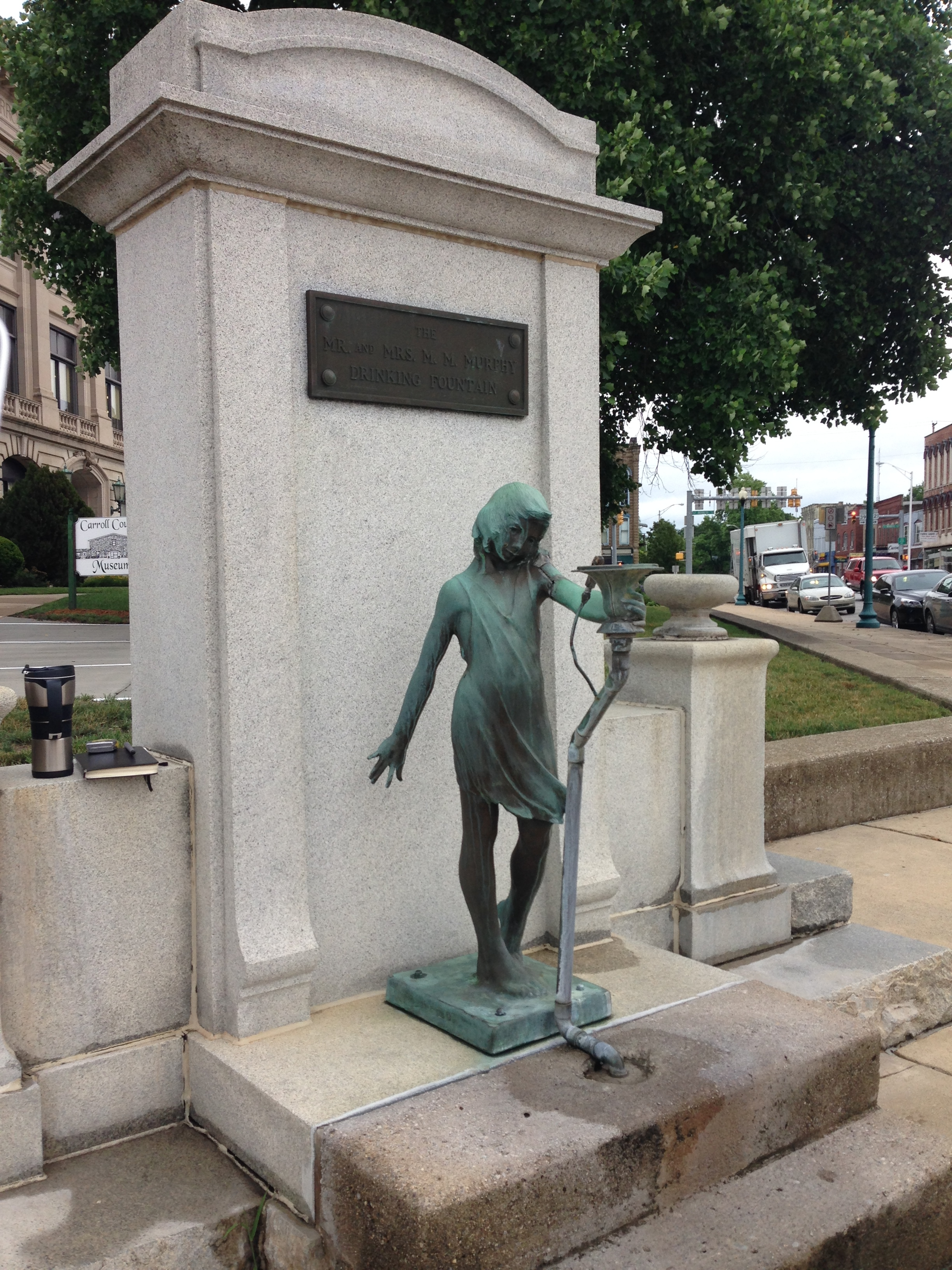
- Artist: Blakley Granite, Marble and Tile Company, Myra Reynolds Richards,
- Year: 1918
- Type: Bronze, Barre Granite
- Location: Delphi, Indiana, United States; 40°35′09″N 86°40′30″W
- Owner: City of Delphi

The Murphy Memorial Drinking Fountain is located in Delphi, Indiana on the southwest corner of the Carroll County Courthouse at Main and Market Streets and owned by the City of Delphi. The fountain was created in 1918 by Indianapolis-based Blakley Granite, Marble and Tile Company in collaboration with the artist Myra Reynolds Richards. Blakley created the architectural elements and Richards created the figural sculpture of the young girl located in the center. Originally there were two drinking fountains contained within the granite chalices on either side while the sculpture had a minor feature that may have bubbled water out of the chalice that the child holds with her right hand.

== Description ==
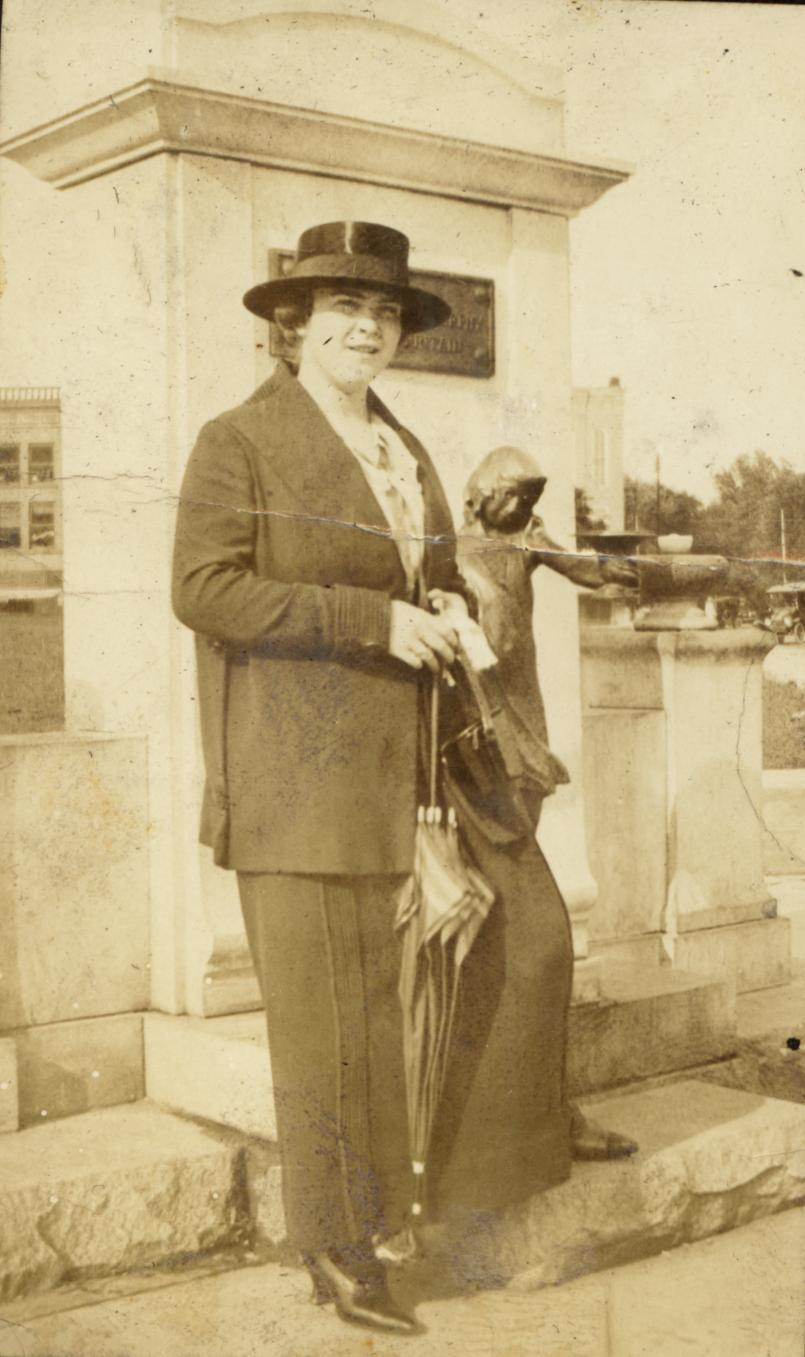
The sculptor Myra Reynolds Richards stands in front of the bronze sculpture she made in 1918 for the Murphy Memorial Drinking Fountain in Delphi, Indiana.

The Murphy Memorial Drinking Fountain is a structure made of Barre Granite, the same stone utilized in the Sailors and Soldiers Monument, which was created in 1888 and stands on the southeast corner of the courthouse square in Delphi, Indiana. The precise date that the fountain was finished is not known, but it appears installed and operational in a photo taken by Andrew W. Wolever on Labor Day in 1919.

The sculpture by Reynolds depicts a young girl wearing a short one piece dress. She holds her left hand out before her with a chalice, which currently contains a drinking fountain. Her right hand is stretched behind her.

A bronze tablet is mounted above the sculpture that reads "The Mr. and Mrs. M. M. Murphy Drinking Fountain". The sculpture was donated by Clara G. Murphy, on behalf of her deceased husband, and herself. The couple owned Murphy's Drugstore from 1875 to 1910, which was located across the street from the fountain at 112 West Main Street.

=== Model for sculpture ===
Lewis Shaffer McGiffin stated in 1963 that she was the model that the sculptor used to create the little girl. Instead of posing for the sculptor in person, a photograph of McGriffin was used. Because the girl is shoeless, wears a short dress, with unadorned hair, McGriffin stated that she was "terribly afraid my schoolmates may discover my identity and wonder why I was in the town square" dressed in such a way. She only admitted later in life to having been the model.

== Historical information ==
The location for the fountain is based on a long-standing community water source on the southwest corner of the courthouse square.

=== 1960s restoration ===
In 1963 the sculpture suffered damage and was no longer dispensing water. The left arm of the sculpture was damaged when the plumbing became clogged, however it was not the clog that broke the arm. Repairmen accidentally broke the arm while investigating the leak. With support from the city council and a community fundraising effort, the fountain was repaired.

=== 1990s restoration ===
By the 1990s the fountain and the sculpture had been altered. A set of concrete steps were added at the front and an oversized bubbler was added on top of the chalice that the child holds. While this bubbler returned the drinking function to the fountain, it significantly altered the appearance.

=== 2010s restoration ===
In 2012 the City of Delphi was named one of Indiana's Stellar Communities, which comes with a grants that allow for rehabilitation of certain parts of the community. Plans are underway to restore the fountain to its original appearance.

== Condition ==
It was surveyed as part of the Save Outdoor Sculpture! survey in 1993, and was noted as needing conservation treatment.

=== Gallery of images ===
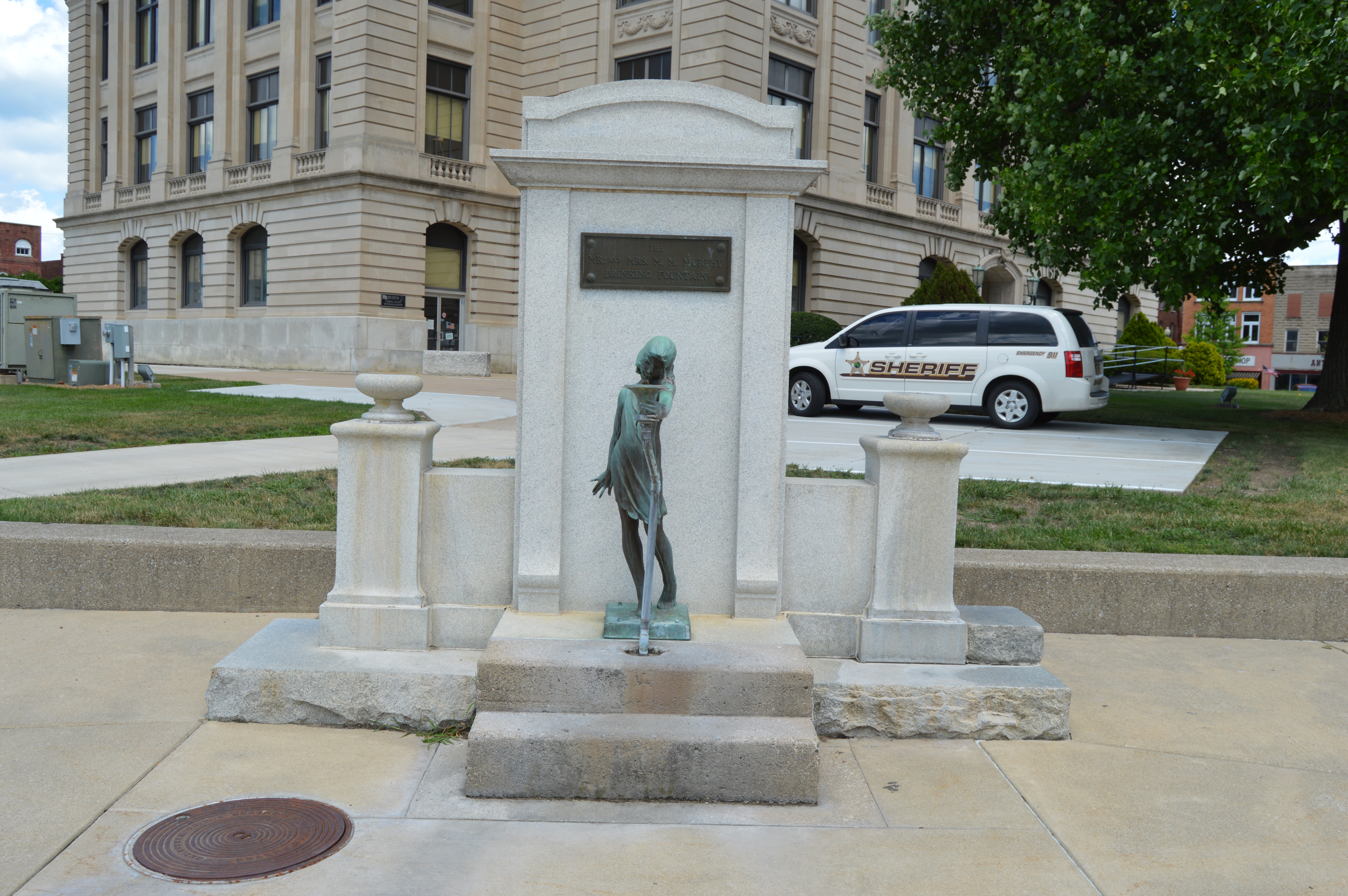
Murphy Memorial Drinking Fountain with courthouse.

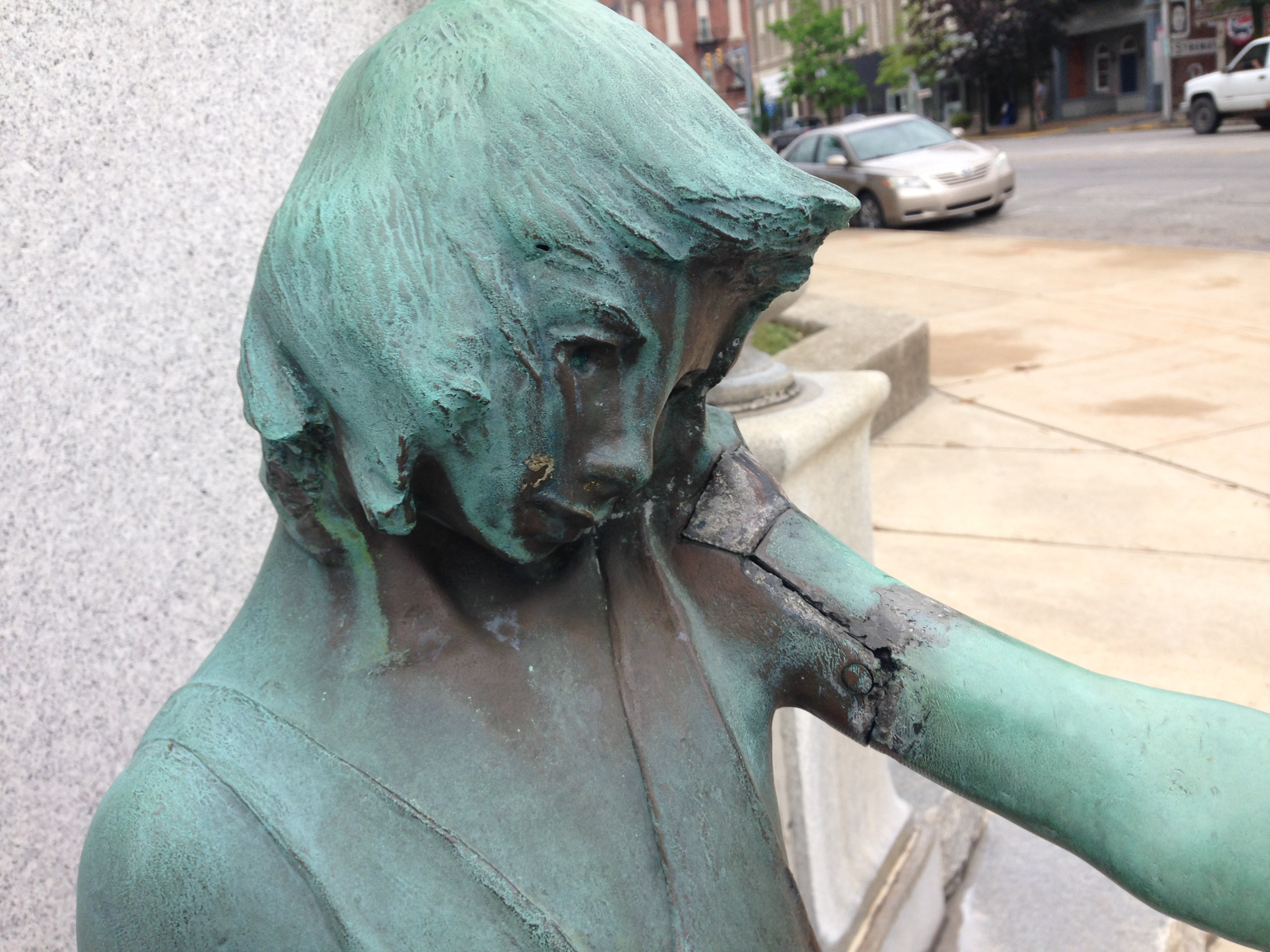
Detail of sculpture in the Murphy Memorial Drinking Fountain showing repaired damaged on the right arm.

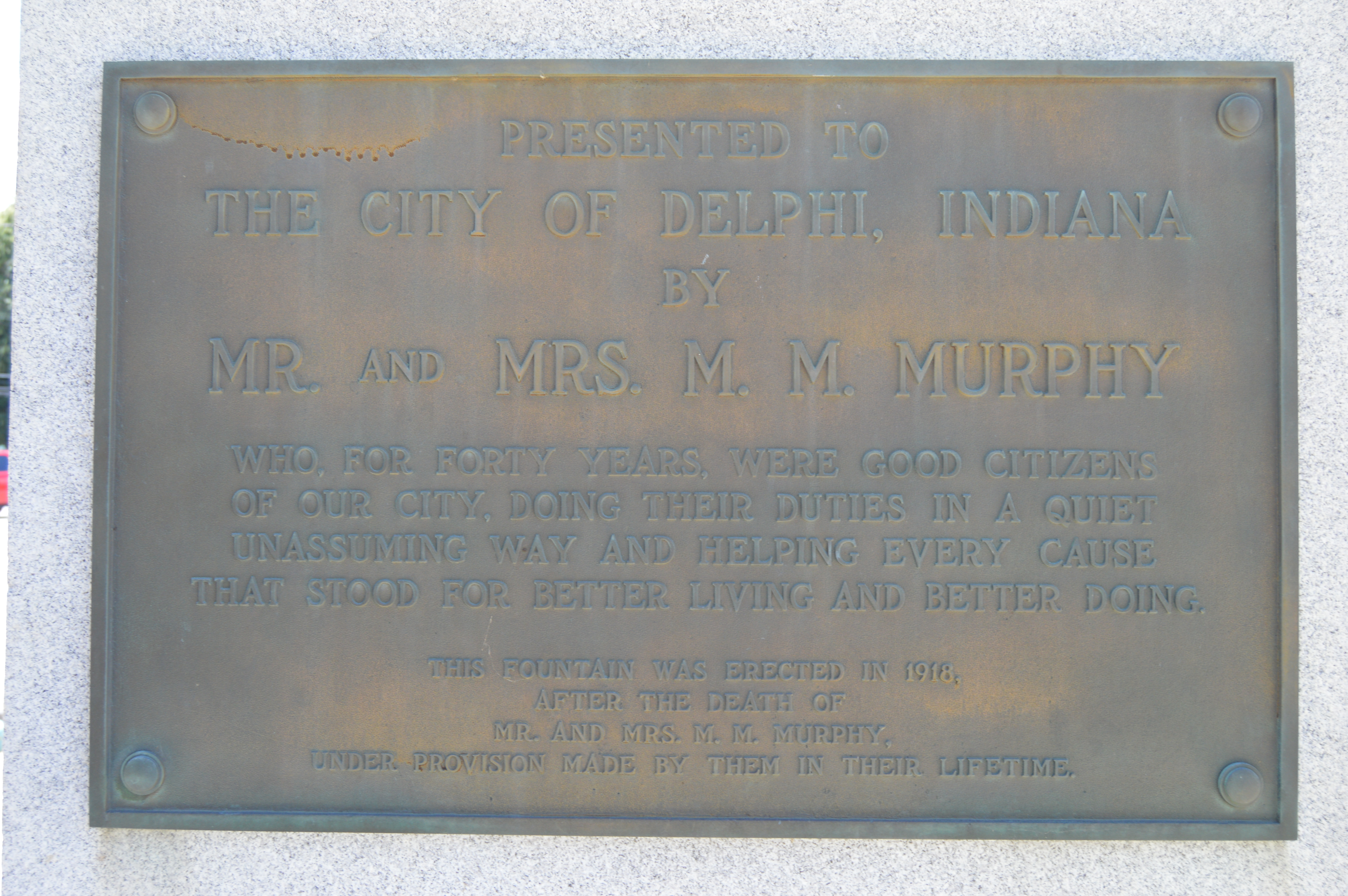
Detail of Plaque on Back of Murphy Memorial Drinking Fountain.

== See also ==
- Drinking fountains in the United States
