= Carroll County Courthouse (Indiana) =

- U.S. National Register of Historic Places
- U.S. Historic district – Contributing property
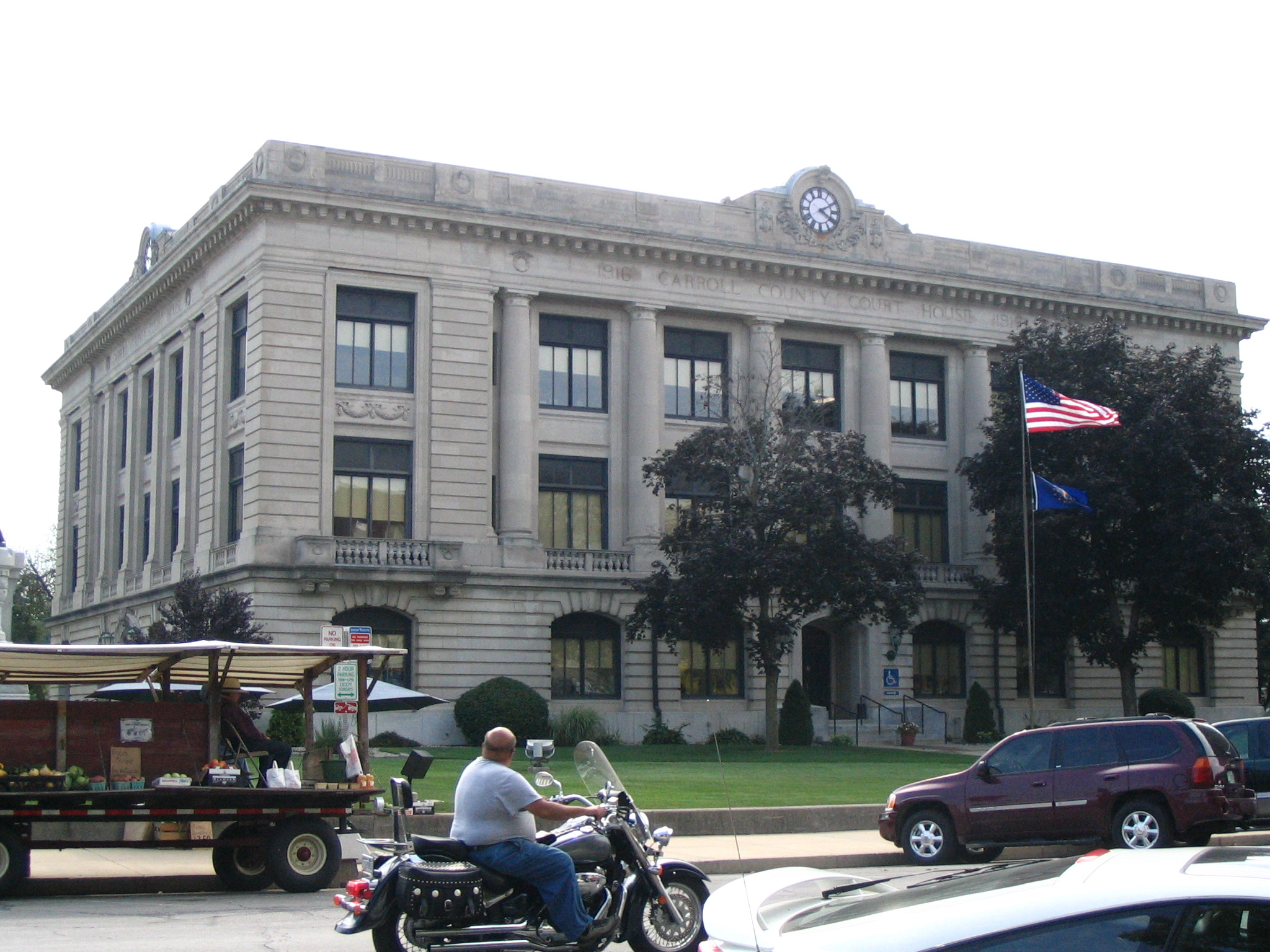

- Location within Carroll County, Indiana Location within Indiana Location within the United States
- Location: 101 W. Main St., Delphi, Indiana
- Coordinates: 40°35′10″N 86°40′29″W
- Area: 1.5 acres (0.61 ha)
- Built: 1888, 1916, 1918
- Architect: Dunlap, Elmer E.; et al.
- Architectural style: Classical Revival
- NRHP reference No.: 03001317
- Added to NRHP: December 23, 2003

The Carroll County Courthouse is a historic courthouse located at 101 W. Main St. in Delphi, Indiana. It was designed by architect Elmer E. Dunlap and built in 1916. It is a three-story Classical Revival style rectangular building of Indiana limestone. It features a three-story projecting pavilion. The Carroll County Courthouse property has two prominent works of public art in its collection: the Murphy Memorial Drinking Fountain (1918) and the Soldiers and Sailors Monument (1888); they are considered contributing objects along with a World War II artillery gun.

It was listed on the National Register of Historic Places in 2003. It is located in the Delphi Courthouse Square Historic District.

== Gallery ==
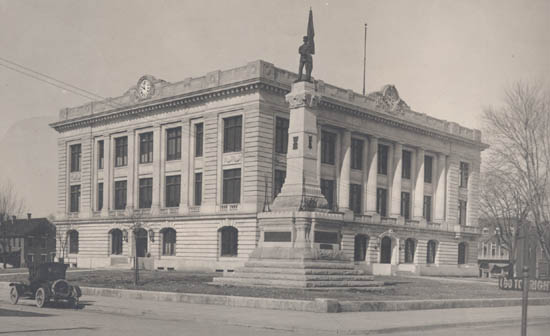
Carroll County Courthouse with Soldiers and Sailors Monument, date unknown
