= Kokomo High School and Memorial Gymnasium =

- U.S. National Register of Historic Places
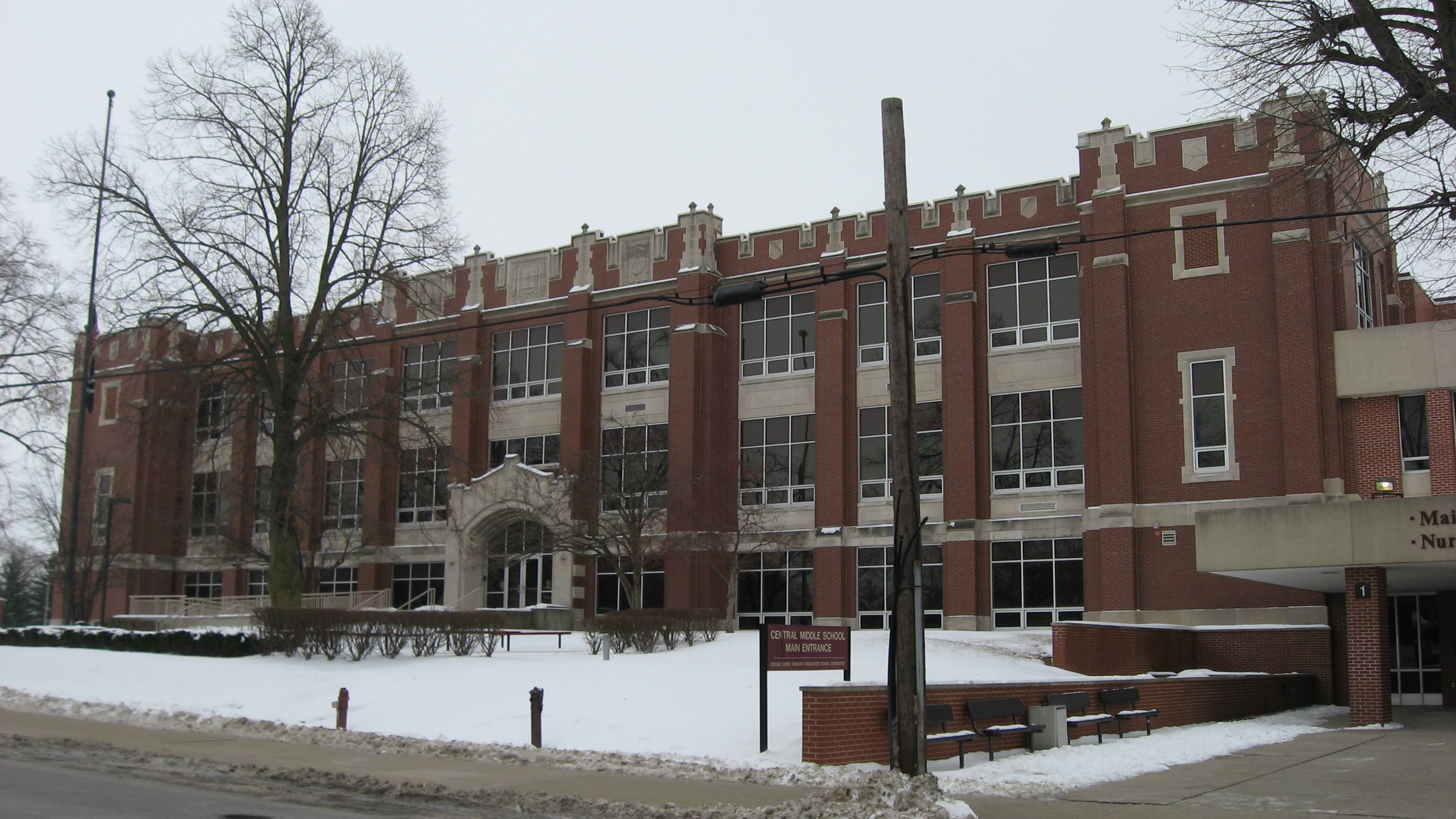
- Front of the school

- Location within Indiana Location within the United States
- Location: 303 E Superior St. and 400 Apperson Way N, Kokomo, Indiana
- Coordinates: 40°29′06″N 86°07′39″W
- Area: 8 acres (3.2 ha)
- Architect: Elmer Dunlap, et al.
- Architectural style: Late Gothic Revival, Moderne
- MPS: Indiana's Public Common and High Schools MPS
- NRHP reference No.: 05000607
- Added to NRHP: June 17, 2005

The Kokomo High School and Memorial Gymnasium is a historic high school and gymnasium located at Kokomo, Indiana, United States. It is a work of architect Elmer Dunlap and others, in Late Gothic Revival and Streamline Moderne architectural styles. It has also been known as the Central Middle School and Memorial Gymnasium. The NRHP listing included three contributing buildings on 8 acres (3.2 ha).

It was listed on the National Register of Historic Places in 2005.

== History ==
The original high school brick building was built in 1914 with sections added on in 1929, 1950, 1973 and 2000. The Gymnasium was completed in 1949 and the boiler building was completed in 1938. Prior to the 1929 addition, the high school had three stories of classrooms and was a total of 29,492 square feet. In 2000 the building became a middle school.

== Memorial Gymnasium ==
In 1923 Haworth Gymnasium was built directly west of the high school. On March 22, 1944, a fire destroyed the gymnasium leading to the creation of Memorial Gymnasium sitting directly east of the school and opening in 1949 at a cost of $800,000. At its opening the gymnasium had 7,200 seats for basketball viewing. Not long after, the capacity was reduced to conform to fire code. Although the high school has since moved about 4 miles away, Memorial Gymnasium is still home to Kokomo high school basketball games.

In 1970, the school added a rear section to the gym, with additional lockers and a swimming pool. In 2019 the gym installed a new center-hanging scoreboard with video screens on all four sides allowing for better viewing at basketball games, wrestling matches, and graduations. Throughout the building there's various kokomo basketball memorabilia along its hallways showing the schools rich history in the sport.

The Gymnasium is a memorial to World War II veterans and includes a room that honors John E. Turner and other Howard County veterans who dies in the war.

The Gymnasium has a basketball seating capacity of 5,224.

In the first season of the Indiana Pacers, the team elected to play a few games around the state to grow the game besides just having games in Indianapolis. Memorial Gym was host to two games that year, with the first being December 5, 1967 versus the New Jersey Americans (which the Pacers won 131–106) while the second was on February 8, 1968, versus the Denver Rockets (which Denver won 98–91).
