= Mathias Sharp House =

Historic house in Indiana, United States

- U.S. National Register of Historic Places
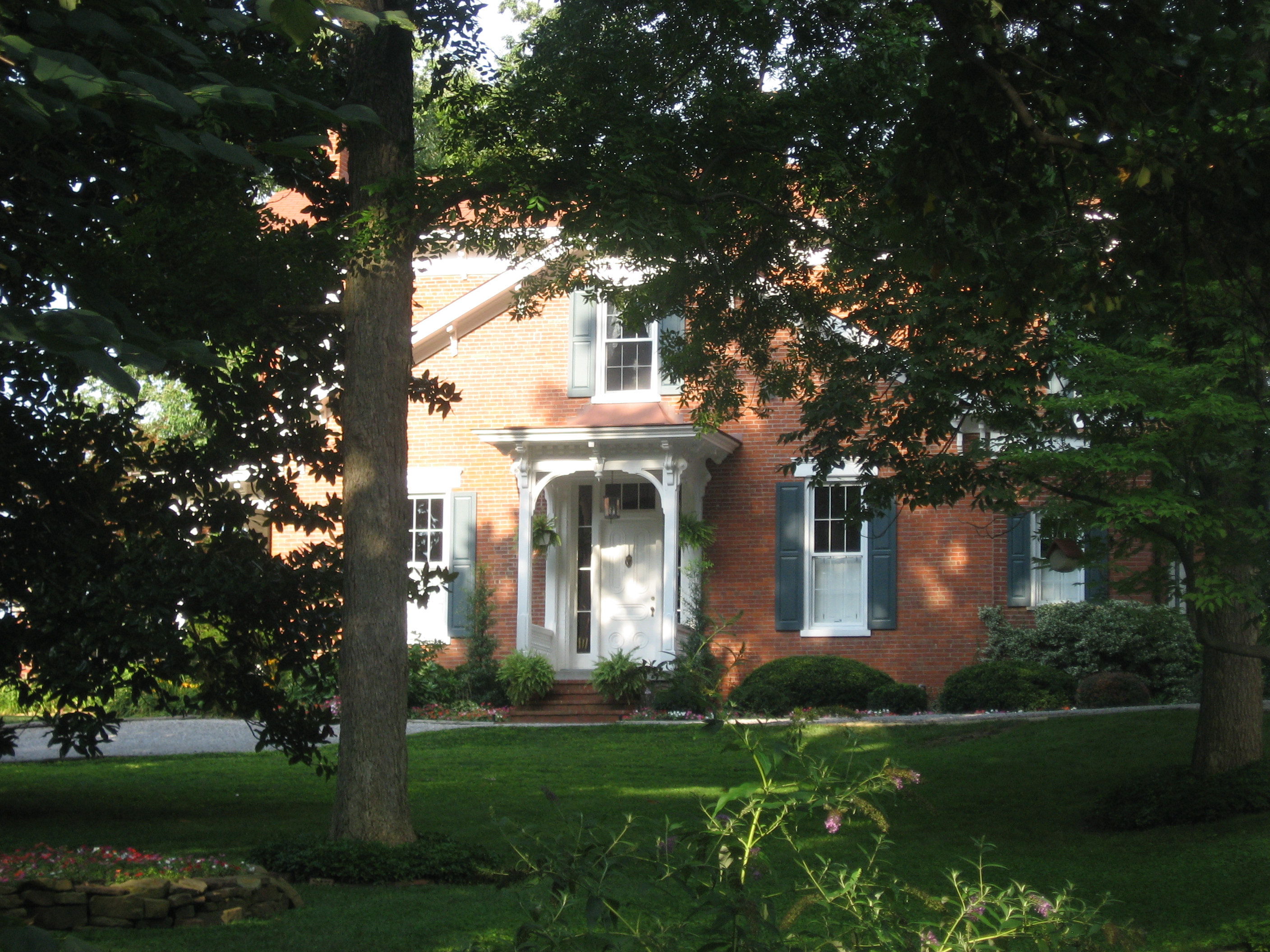
- Western facade of the house

- Location within Indiana Location within the United States
- Location: 319 S. 2nd St., Rockport, Indiana
- Coordinates: 37°52′48″N 87°2′40″W
- Area: Less than 1 acre (0.40 ha)
- Built: 1867
- Architectural style: Italianate
- NRHP reference No.: 83000148
- Added to NRHP: June 16, 1983

The Mathias Sharp House is a historic residence in Rockport, Indiana. Built in the third quarter of the nineteenth century, it was the center of a prominent murder trial not long after its construction, and it has been designated a historic site.

== History ==
Mathias Sharp was one of Spencer County's leading early residents. At an uncertain time after the end of the War of 1812, Sharp moved from his native New Jersey to the vicinity of present-day Rockport, where he purchased wide lands along the Ohio River. Here, he became a prosperous farmer, and a prominent citizen of the county. By the mid-1850s, he had established himself firmly enough to be able to participate in the creation of a local high school, buying 2 of the original 176 shares of stock in a company formed to establish the school.

Sharp's wife Mary died in 1854, and he remarried slightly less than two years later to a much younger woman, Catherine Shumaker. After about a decade of marriage, the couple had the present house constructed; according to family legend, he built it for her, despite the long gap between their marriage and its construction. Mathias did not long enjoy the new property; just two years after the house was built, he died of apparent poisoning. Just one year later, Catherine married a local merchant, who in turn died in early 1871, less than a year after their marriage. Poison was again suspected, and Catherine was quickly arrested and charged with the murder of her two husbands as well as that of Mary Sharp. The press likened her to Lucrezia Borgia, and a widely publicized trial resulted; it was more sensational than all other contemporary trials in the region, despite being moved to the courthouse at Cannelton in Perry County at Catherine's request. Unable to pay for her defense, she gained the help of German-born Rockport businessman John Eigenmann. After she was acquitted of murder, he took possession of the house in exchange for his aid, and his family owned the property until 1913. In that year, it was purchased by Francis Posey, whose family owned it into the late twentieth century.

== Architecture ==
The Sharp House is a brick building constructed in the plan of a cross; except for the western (rear) arm, it is a two-story structure. The primary entrance is through a door on the western arm; it is accessed by means of a decorated porch and flanked by a transom and sidelights. Numerous windows pierce the walls of the western wing.

Despite the westward orientation of the main entrance, the house primarily looks to the east, due to its location atop a bluff on the western bank of the Ohio River. Massive elements, such as a bay window and a large pavilion, contribute to the elaborate appearance of the eastern facade. Other elements present on various sides of the house include decorative porches, stone windowsills, a detailed cornice, and entablatures above many windows. The interior features a grand entrance with a walnut stairway, a cathedral ceiling, eight fireplaces with iron or wooden mantels, oak fretwork, and extensive use of poplar.

== Preservation ==
Despite its construction in the third quarter of the nineteenth century, the Mathias Sharp House was preserved unusually well by its owners into its second century. Its Italianate style and its location atop a river bluff have made it one of the city's leading buildings. In 1983, the house was listed on the National Register of Historic Places, qualifying because of its historically important architecture.
