= Kate Milner Rabb =

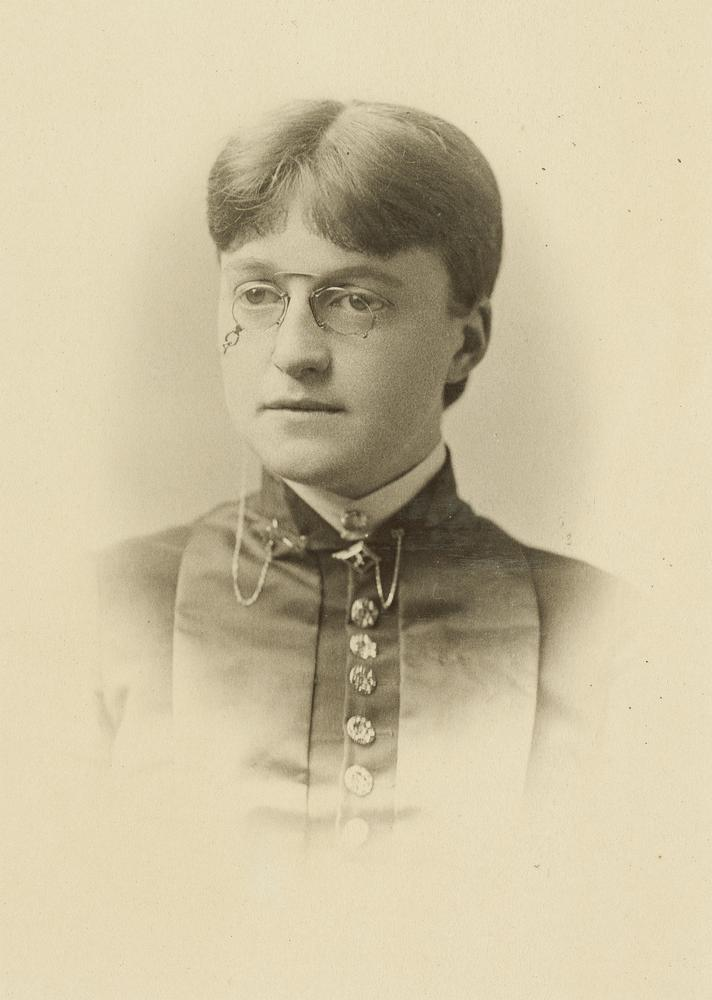
- Kate Milner Rabb circa 1886
- Born: August 9, 1866; Rockport, Indiana, U.S.
- Died: July 3, 1937 (aged 70); Indianapolis, Indiana
- Resting place: Mount Hope Cemetery, Covington, Fountain County, Indiana
- Education: Master's degree in Journalism, Indiana University, Bloomington
- Occupations: Author; Journalist; Historian
- Employer: The Indianapolis Star
- Spouse: Albert L. Rabb (1891–1863)
- Children: Albert Livingston and Martha Charlotte

Kate Milner Rabb (August 9, 1866–July 3, 1937), born in Rockport, Indiana, was an American columnist, editor, historian, and author. She has been described as a '"pioneer in the field of journalism,"' who influenced '"the destiny of women in journalism today."' In 1896, her first book was published, titled, "National Epics," a collection of epic stories including, the Iliad, and the Odyssey.

Rabb edited Indiana Women, a weekly magazine, and wrote a number of articles and stories for publications, including St. Nicholas magazine, and Youth's Companion. She edited and authored a number books and pamphlets, and columns, but was best known for her daily column, "A Hoosier Listening Post," for The Indianapolis Star. She was inducted into the Indiana Journalism Hall of Fame in 2012.

== Background and education ==
Rabb was born to parents Dr. Isaac Livingston and Martha (Parsons) Milner, in Rockport, Spencer County, Indiana. She attended Rockport High School, (class of 1882) before enrolling at Indiana University, at the age of 15. Rabb, a member of the Kappa Alpha Theta sorority, graduated with her bachelor's degree in 1886, and received her master's degree in 1888. She taught at Rockport High School, and in Jefferson, after graduation until she married, Albert L. Rabb, on October 7, 1891, and moved to Indianapolis. They had two children, Albert Livingston (1893–1939) and Martha Charlotte (1899–1951).

== Career ==
Rabb's husband was a prominent attorney, and she was active in the community, believing that women should engage in activities apart from those of their husband's. In the 1890s, she edited Indiana Women, a weekly magazine, and wrote a number of articles and stories for St. Nicholas magazine, and Youth's Companion. In 1896, her first book was published, titled, "National Epics," a collection of epic stories including, the Iliad, and the Odyssey.

She translated the book, "Boer Boy of the Transvaal; from the German of August Miemann," published in 1900. The book, originally written in German, is a fictional account of a 10-year-old boy in Transvaal, a province of South Africa detailing his experiences during the Anglo-Boer war. Rabb also edited the book, "The Wit and Humor of America," published in 1907.

Rabb wrote a column, "The Old Town," focused on Indianapolis history, which was published three times a week. Described as "an admirable series of articles," in an issue of Indiana University's Alumni Quarterly, the articles were "designed to arouse interest in the forthcoming centennial of Indianapolis. In July, 1916, she wrote the pamphlet, "The Pageant of Spencer County," in honor of Indiana's 100th anniversary. She continued writing "The Old Town," series, through 1927.

After the death of her husband in 1918, Rabb became more active in her writing career, adding a new weekly column to her work for the Indianapolis Star. The column was based on the travels of a fictional character named John Parsons; Parsons journeys took him throughout Indiana during its early years. Later, in 1920, she published a historical novel, based on the fictional stories published in her weekly column. The book, titled, "A Tour Through Indiana in 1840," was written as a diary, documenting his travels.

Rabb wrote a daily column, titled, "A Hoosier Listening Post." The column was first published in 1920, and was published daily, until her death in 1937. Julie Slaymaker, of the Woman's Press Club of Indiana, (WPCI) wrote Rabb's biography, upon her induction into the 2012 Indiana Journalism Hall of Fame. Slaymaker noted that Rabb was elected as president of WPCI, serving in the position for three years. Slaymaker noted that an earlier club member recalled how '"Mrs. Rabb's interest in her native state formed the basis of her books and her daily column, 'A Hoosier Listening Post,' through which she was known throughout the state."' In the closing paragraph of Rabb's biography, Slaymaker quoted a joint statement by two members of the Society of Indiana Pioneers and Woman's Press Club of Indiana:

"Not only was Kate Milner Rabb a descendant of Indiana pioneers, but a pioneer in the field of journalism when few women had the time, means and ability to write for publication and influence the destiny of women in journalism today."

— Julie Slaymaker, quoting Joan Bey and Jinsie Bingham, Kate Milner Rabb • 2012, Indiana Journalism Hall of Fame

== Death ==
Kate Milner Rabb, died on July 3, 1937, at the age of 70. Her obituary noted that her death came, following a short illness, shocking "a wide circle of friends." She was buried next to her husband, at Mount Hope Cemetery, in Covington, Fountain County, Indiana.

== Honors and recognition ==
On May 7, 1961, the president of Indiana University, Herman B. Wells, presided over the ceremony in dedication of the Kate Milner Rabb Hall, at the student residence building, Teter Quadrangle.

In 2012, Rabb was inducted into the Indiana Journalism Hall of Fame.

== Activities ==
Rabb was an active member in her community, and a member of historical, social, and cultural clubs and organizations. Some are listed below.

- The Indiana Historical Commission, appointed in 1923 in recognition of her authority on Indiana history.
- The Indiana Historical Society.
- The Woman's Press Club of Indiana.
- The Society of Indiana Pioneers.

She was also a member of Woman's Rotary, Indiana Artists, and the Nature Study clubs.

== Selected works ==
Indiana State Library maintains a collection of clips of Rabb's columns, and The Floyd County Library maintains a collection of her works.

- National Epics, A.C. McClurg and Company, 1915 (originally published in 1896)
- The Boer Boy of the Transvaal, Penn Publishing Company, 1900
- A Tour Through Indiana in 1840: the Diary of John Parsons of Petersburg, Virginia, McBride, 1920
- Indiana Coverlets and Coverlet Weavers, Indiana Historical Society publications, V. 8. No. 8, 1928
