= Ralph Waldo Emerson Indianapolis Public School No. 58 =

- Ralph Waldo Emerson Indianapolis Public School #58
- U.S. National Register of Historic Places
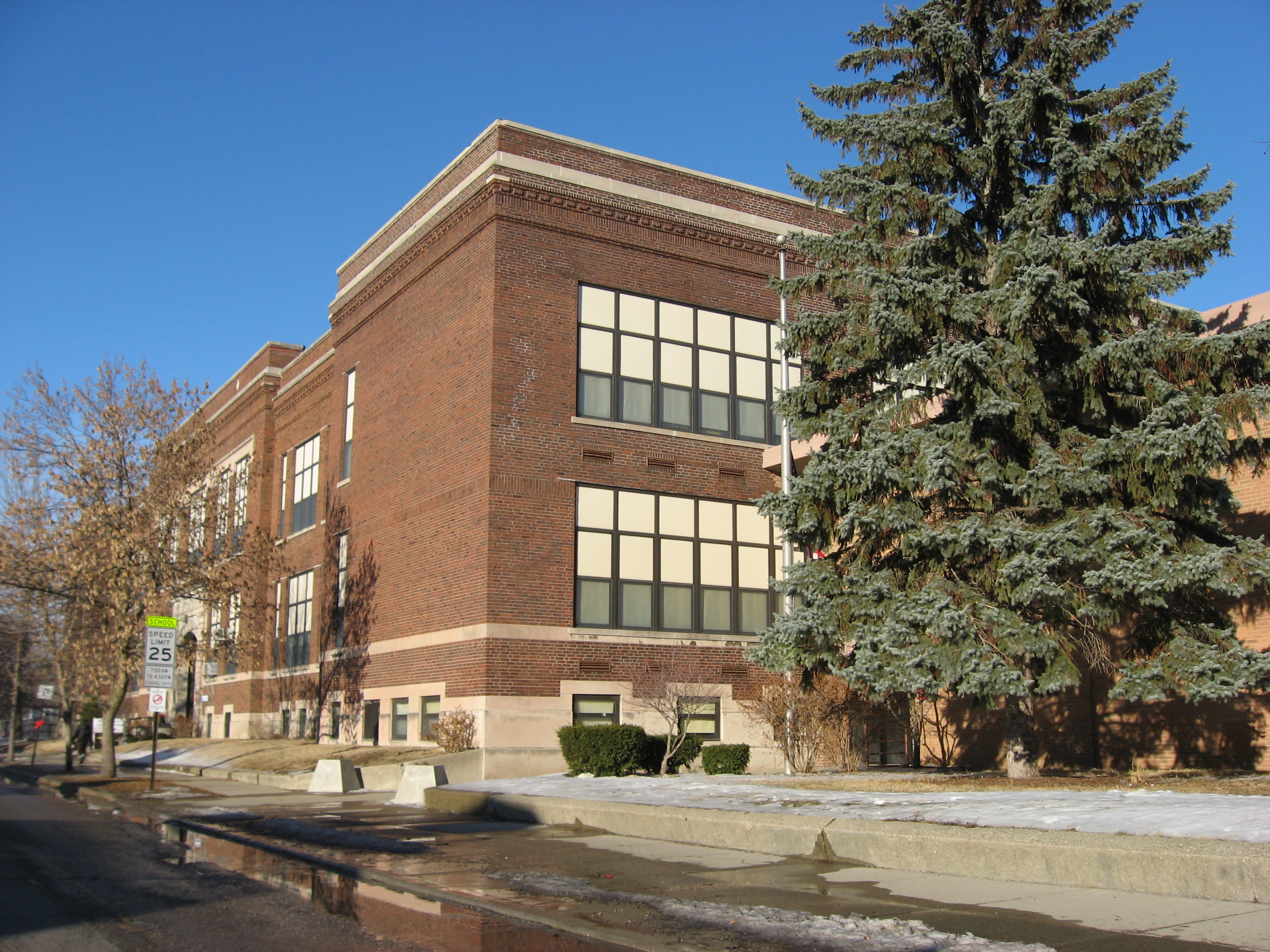
- Front of the school

- Location within Indianapolis Location within Indiana Location within the United States
- Location: 321 N. Linwood St., Indianapolis, Indiana
- Coordinates: 39°46′29″N 86°5′32″W
- Area: Less than 1 acre (0.40 ha)
- Built: 1907, 1917, 1921, 1967
- Architect: R.P. Daggett and Co.; Elmer E. Dunlap
- Architectural style: Late 19th and 20th Century Revivals
- MPS: Public School Buildings in Indianapolis Built Before 1940 MPS
- NRHP reference No.: 04001309
- Added to NRHP: December 6, 2004

The Ralph Waldo Emerson Indianapolis Public School #58 is a historic school building located on N. Linwood St. in Indianapolis, Indiana, United States. It was built in 1907 according to a design by R.P. Daggett and Co. It is a two-story, rectangular brick building on a raised basement in a simplified Classical Revival style. Additions were made to the building in 1917, 1921 (by Elmer E. Dunlap), and 1967.

It was listed on the National Register of Historic Places in 2004.

== See also ==
- Indianapolis Public Schools
- National Register of Historic Places listings in Center Township, Marion County, Indiana
