= Spencer County Courthouse (Indiana) =

- U.S. National Register of Historic Places
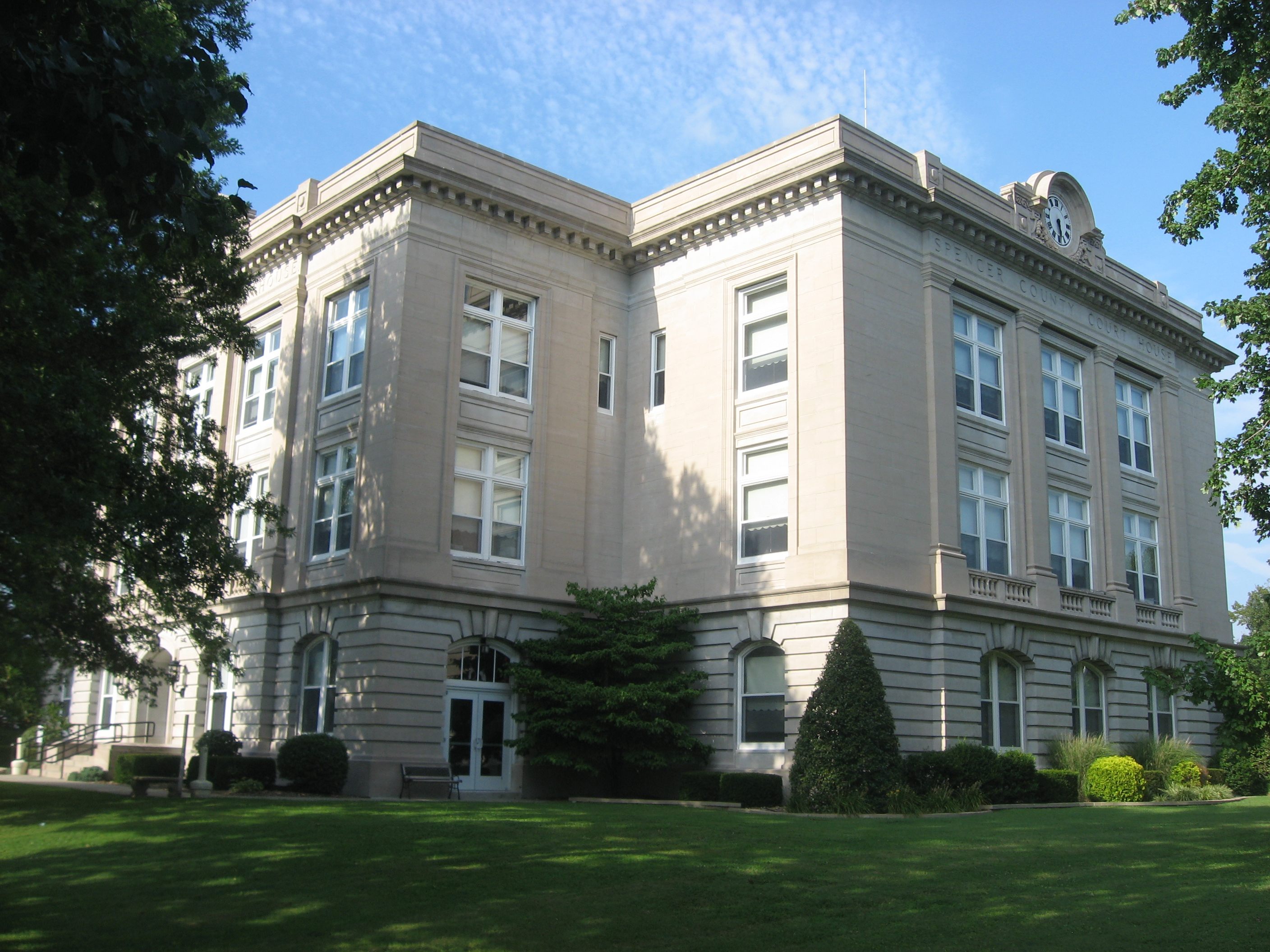
- Spencer County Courthouse, July 2012

- Location within Indiana Location within the United States
- Interactive map showing the location for Spencer County Courthouse
- Location: Bounded by 2nd, 3rd, Main, and Walnut Sts., Rockport, Indiana
- Coordinates: 37°52′57″N 87°2′47″W
- Area: 1.4 acres (0.57 ha)
- Built: 1921
- Architect: Elmer E. Dunlap
- Architectural style: Neoclassical
- NRHP reference No.: 99000304
- Added to NRHP: March 12, 1999

The Spencer County Courthouse is a historic courthouse located at Rockport, Indiana. It was designed by architect Elmer E. Dunlap and built in 1921. It is a three-story, rectangular, seven bay by five bay, Neoclassical style limestone building. The main facade features a projecting five bay central section with engaged Roman Doric ordercolumns. The interior is organized around a central rotunda topped by a shallow stained glass dome.

It was listed on the National Register of Historic Places in 1999.
