= Hope Historic District (Hope, Indiana) =

Historic district in Indiana, United States

- U.S. National Register of Historic Places
- U.S. Historic district
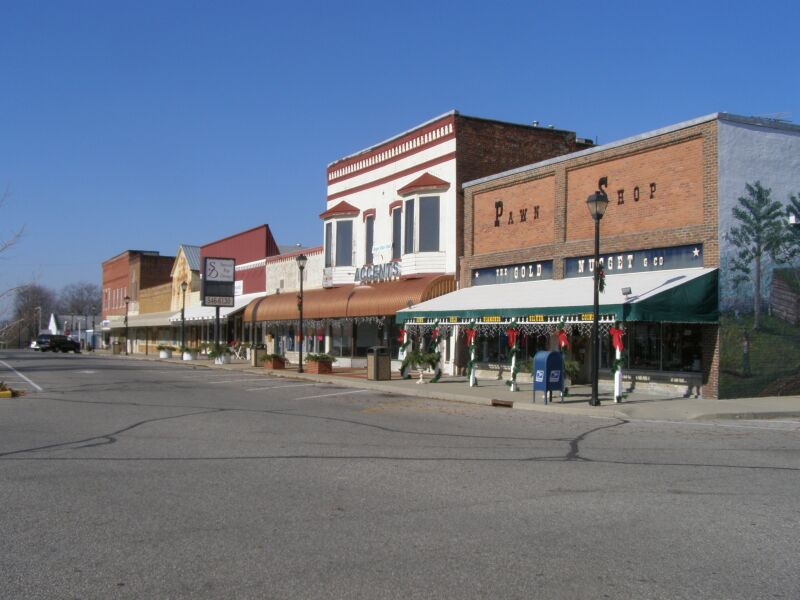

- Location within Bartholomew County, Indiana Location within Indiana Location within the United States
- Location: Roughly bounded by Haw Cr., Grand St., Walnut St. and South St., Hope, Indiana
- Coordinates: 39°18′04″N 85°46′13″W
- Area: 114 acres (46 ha)
- Architect: Dunlap, Elmer E.; Weisner, L.W.
- Architectural style: Greek Revival, Italianate, Hall and parlor
- NRHP reference No.: 91001864
- Added to NRHP: December 19, 1991

Hope Historic District is a 114-acre (46 ha) national historic district located at Hope, Indiana. It encompasses 205 contributing buildings, four contributing sites and two contributing objects in the central business district and surrounding residential areas of Hope. It was developed between about 1840 and 1940, includes works by architect Elmer E. Dunlap and by L.W. Weisner, and notable examples of Greek Revival, Italianate, Hall and parlor, and other architecture. Notable buildings include the Moravian Church (1875) and old parsonage (1875), City School (1906), Baptist Church, Methodist Episcopal Church (1887), Alfred Sanford Rominger House (c. 1840), Frank Stapp House (c. 1890), Masonic Temple (1910), and E.B. Spaugh Building (1915).

It was listed on the National Register of Historic Places in 1991.

== See also ==
- National Register of Historic Places listings in Bartholomew County, Indiana
