= Pike County Courthouse (Indiana) =

- U.S. National Register of Historic Places
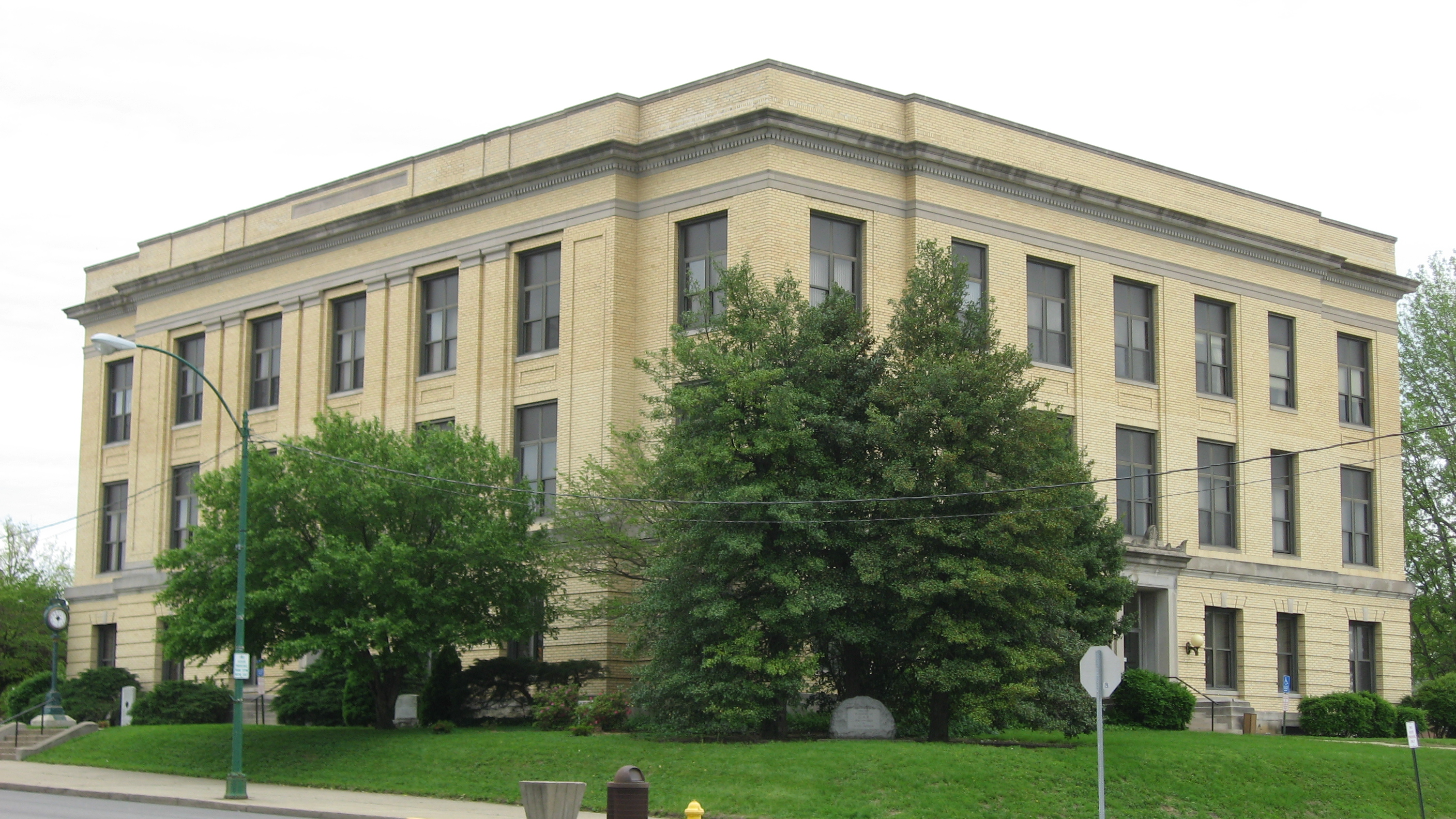
- View from the west

- Location within Indiana Location within the United States
- Location: 801 Main St., Petersburg, Indiana
- Coordinates: 38°29′29″N 87°16′43″W
- Area: Less than 1 acre (0.40 ha)
- Built: 1922
- Architect: Elmer E. Dunlap, Jasper N. Good
- Architectural style: Neoclassical
- NRHP reference No.: 08000913
- Added to NRHP: September 17, 2008

The Pike County Courthouse is a historic courthouse located at 801 Main St. in Petersburg, Indiana. It was designed by architects Elmer E. Dunlap and of Jasper N. Good and built in 1922. It is a three-story, Neoclassical style, nearly square, concrete and buff brick building with slightly projecting pavilions on three sides. It measures 114 feet by 109 feet. Also on the property are five contributing objects: a GAR memorial, veterans' memorial, and three metal street lamps.

It was listed on the National Register of Historic Places in 2008.
