= Soldiers and Sailors Monument (Delphi, Indiana) =

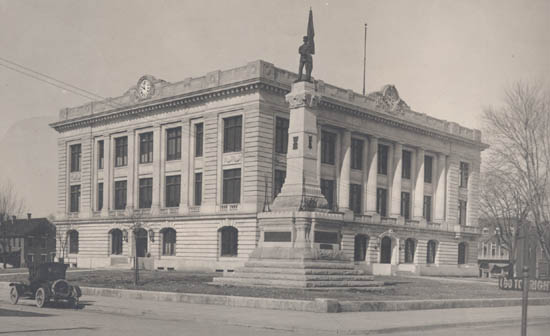
- Artist: Rudolf Schwarz; Bruno Schmitz
- Year: 1882-1888
- Type: Bronze; Granite
- Dimensions: 300 cm × 91 cm × 91 cm (120 in × 36 in × 36 in)
- Location: Carroll County Courthouse, Delphi, Indiana, United States; 40°35′10.52″N 86°40′27.74″W
- Owner: Carroll County Commissioners

The Soldiers and Sailors Monument is a work of public art in Delphi, Indiana in the United States. It is located at the Carroll County Courthouse, and comprises the collection on the National Register of Historic Places listing making up the courthouse and the square.

== Description ==
The memorial is made of bronze and has a base made of granite. On the top of a tall shaft is a color bearer from the American Civil War. The color bearer holds a staff with a furled flag in both hands. It is held to his proper left side. The shaft the figure is standing on has two pieces of bunting decorating it, along with eagles, military medals, and a row of mortar shells and round shot. The tower is resting on a battlement style design. Each corner of the battlement design has a musket made of bronze. There are four in total.

There is a bronze relief panel on each side of the base. They depict:

1. Six infantrymen fighting eight artillerymen, representing the Battle of Shiloh and Battle of Stones River
2. Soldiers going off into battle and saying goodbye to their families to fight at the Battle of the Wilderness and Battle of Cedar Creek
3. Soldiers returning from battle from the Siege of Vicksburg and Battle of Champion Hill, titled The Return Home
4. Cavalrymen fighting infantrymen at the Battle of Antietam and Battle of Gettysburg

One of the panels is titled "The Dying Soldier," but it is unclear what one. The base also has cut stone decorating it.

A plaque, made of bronze, on the east side of the base says:

ERECTED BY CARROLL COUNTY INDIANA
IN MEMORY OF HER SOLDIERS AND SAILORS

== Acquisition ==
The county held an international competition for the creation of the monument. It was held in 1887. Architect Bruno Schmitz was awarded the commission, and he hired Rudolf Schwarz as the sculptor. The exact date of the installation of the piece has yet to be determined. Documentation states that it was installed in either 1882, 1886 or 1888.

== Other information ==
The piece has been described as being a combination of an "Egyptian obelisk form with Romantic classical elements" by historians. Sculptor Rudolf Schwarz also worked on the Soldiers' and Sailors' Monument in Indianapolis, therefore the Delphi piece has some of that influence in it.

== Condition ==
The sculpture was examined by a Save Outdoor Sculpture! surveyor in 1993. It was described as being "well maintained."

== Controversy ==
Author and director of Indiana's Save Outdoor Sculpture! initiative Glory-Jume Grieff states, "This pieces sometimes mistakenly attributed to Austrian-born sculptor Rudolpph Schwarz (1866-1912) but it was completed fifteen years before Schwarz arrived in Indiana." The same is true for architect Schmitz.
