= Thomas Gamble Pitcher =

Superintendent of the US Military Academy 1866–1870

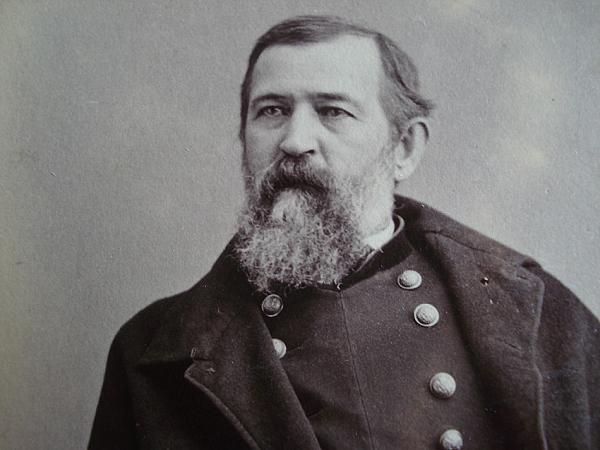
- Born: October 23, 1824; Rockport, Indiana, U.S.
- Died: October 21, 1895 (aged 70); Fort Bayard, New Mexico, U.S.
- Burial place: Arlington National Cemetery
- Military career
- Allegiance: United States of America; Union
- Branch: United States Army; Union Army
- Service years: 1845–1878
- Rank: Brigadier General
- Commands: Superintendent of the United States Military Academy
- Conflicts: Mexican–American War; American Civil War

Thomas Gamble Pitcher (October 23, 1824 – October 21, 1895) was an American army officer who served as Superintendent of the United States Military Academy from 1866 until 1870.

== Early life and education ==
Pitcher was born on October 23, 1824, in Rockport, Indiana, son of Judge John Pitcher, who loaned his law books to young Abraham Lincoln. He graduated from United States Military Academy at West Point in 1845 as 40th out of a class of 41.

== Career ==
Pitcher was commissioned into the 5th U.S. Infantry Regiment. A year later, he transferred to the 8th U.S. Infantry Regiment. He fought in the Mexican–American War and received the brevet rank of first lieutenant for his services in the battles of Contreras and Churubusco. He spent most of the following decade as Adjutant and then Quartermaster of his regiment; and was promoted to captain in 1858.

During the Civil War, Pitcher led a provisional battalion in the defense of Harpers Ferry in June 1862, where he and his men were among the thousands of Union soldiers who surrendered to Stonewall Jackson. After being released and exchanged, he served in the Virginia campaign until the battle of Cedar Mountain (August 9, 1862), where he was severely wounded. He was then brevetted major in the regular army, and three months later was commissioned brigadier general of United States Volunteers. For the remainder of the war he served as Provost Marshal General, first for Vermont and then for Indiana. On March 13, 1865, he was brevetted lieutenant colonel, colonel, and brigadier general in the regular army.

On July 28, 1866, Pitcher was commissioned as the colonel of the 44th U.S. Infantry Regiment. From 1866 to 1870 he was superintendent of the United States Military Academy, and from 1870 until 1877 was superintendent of the New York Soldiers and Sailors Home.

== Death ==
He died of tuberculosis, on October 21, 1895, in the Fort Bayard Historic District in New Mexico, and was interred in Arlington National Cemetery, along with his sons, Lt. Col. John Pitcher, also a West Point graduate, class of 1876, and Col. William L. Pitcher.

== See also ==
- List of American Civil War generals (Union)

Military offices
Preceded by George Washington Cullum	Superintendents of the U.S. Military Academy; 1866–1870	Succeeded by Thomas Howard Ruger
