= Hope, Indiana =

- Town
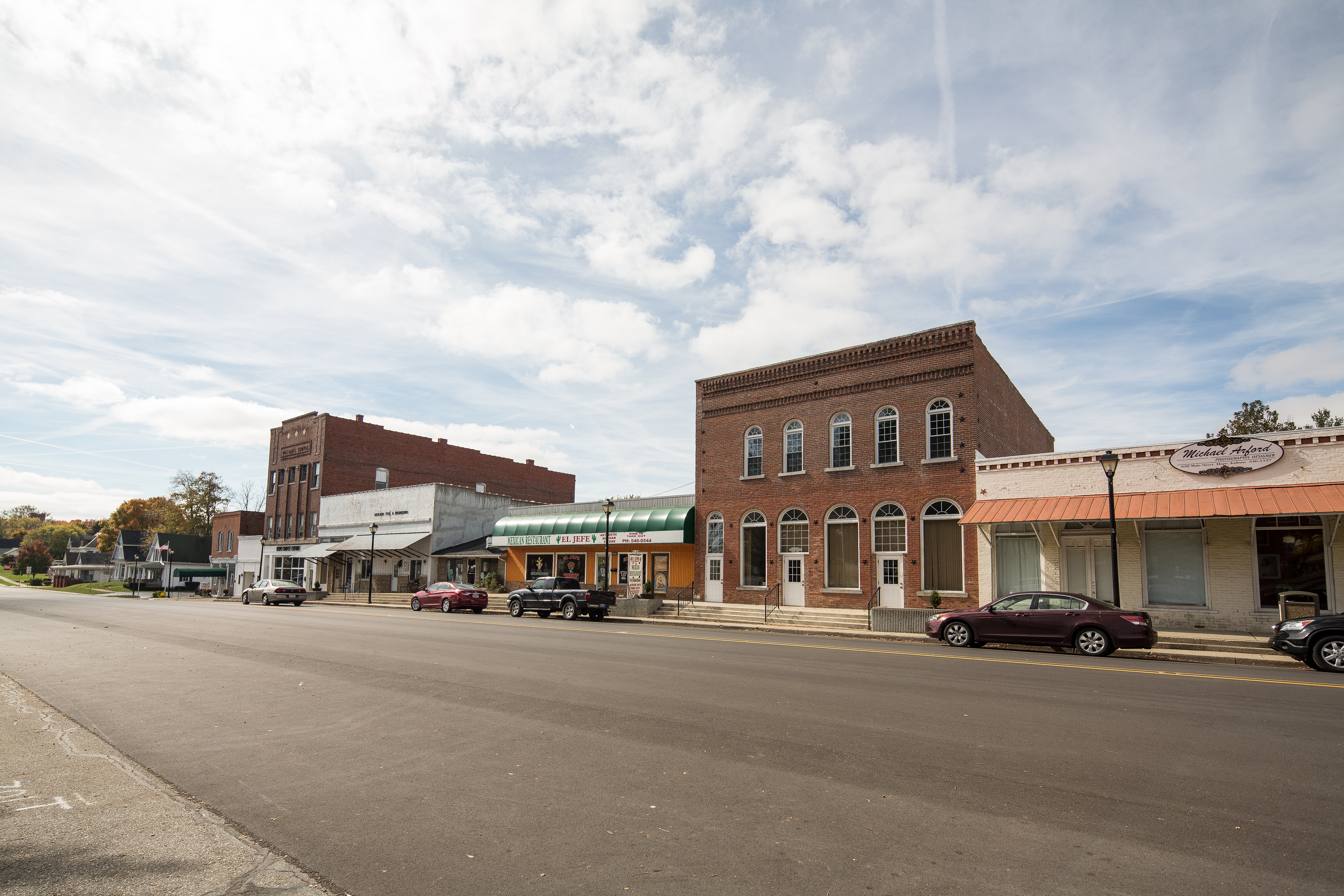

- Flag Logo

- Location of Hope in Bartholomew County, Indiana.
- Coordinates: 39°17′57″N 85°45′58″W
- Country: United States
- State: Indiana
- County: Bartholomew
- Township: Haw Creek
- Established: 1830

Area
  - Total: 0.95 sq mi (2.47 km^{2})
  - Land: 0.95 sq mi (2.47 km^{2})
  - Water: 0 sq mi (0.00 km^{2})
- Elevation: 735 ft (224 m)

Population (2020)
  - Total: 2,099
  - Density: 2,200/sq mi (851/km^{2})
- Time zone: UTC-5 (EST)
  - Summer (DST): UTC-5 (EST)
- ZIP code: 47246
- Area code: 812
- FIPS code: 18-34744
- GNIS feature ID: 2397000
- Website: townofhope.org

Hope is a town in Haw Creek Township, Bartholomew County, Indiana, United States, known for its historic character. The population was 2,099 at the 2020 census. It is part of the Columbus, Indiana, metropolitan statistical area.

== History ==
Historically the Delaware tribe lived in what is now Bartholomew County, Indiana, including the region of Hope. After the Battle of Fallen Timbers in 1794 in Ohio, the Miami tribe moved west and into much of the area inhabited by the Delaware. In turn the Miami were driven out by war with the U.S., and in particular by forces led by John Tipton and Joseph Bartholomew. Tipton and Bartholomew were among the men who fought at the Battle of Tippecanoe in 1811, forcing the Native Americans to cede more territory to the U.S. government. Later Tipton and Bartholomew came through what is now Bartholomew County, on instructions from the government to "rid the area of Indians." Many of the Miami were removed to Oklahoma, though a group of Miami remain in Indiana without federal recognition. Indiana was admitted to the union in 1816, and in October 1818, under pressure from the U.S. government, the Miami, Potawatomi, Wea, and Delaware tribes signed treaties with the U.S. exchanging millions of acres of their land in central Indiana for annuities and goods, opening this forest region to settlers looking for lands to farm.

The first settlement at Hope was made in 1830 by a colony of Moravians (people of the Protestant Moravian denomination) from Salem, North Carolina (now Winston-Salem), led by the Rev. Martin Hauser, after whom the town high school is named. Although a 1905 source claimed that the town was named for the optimistic spirit of its Moravian pioneer settlers, "Hope" is a common name for religious settlements, denoting hope in God's favor and the resurrection. The town was originally named Goshen, after the Biblical Goshen, but upon the establishment of a post office in 1834 the name was changed to Hope, as Indiana already had a town named Goshen. The town was founded to be a communal settlement like that of the two prominent Moravian settlements in the United States, Salem, North Carolina and Bethlehem, Pennsylvania. The model for these did not work for a farming community like Hope, and early on the decision was made to end community property and allow residents to own their own land. Soon thereafter the town was also opened to non-Moravians.

In the middle of the nineteenth century a Moravian day school was opened in Hope, and soon thereafter it was decided that the school should be transformed into a boarding school for young women, under the auspices of the Moravian Church. Guidance and funds were provided from the Moravian Church in Bethlehem, Pennsylvania, and the Hope Moravian Seminary for Young Ladies opened in 1866. A building, a house for the principal and his family, and extensive grounds were situated on what is now Seminary Street. The school was run for thirteen years by the Rev. Francis R. Holland and his wife Augusta Holland, with a number of teachers, and offered a wide program of study, including Latin, English, French, German, music, drawing, mathematics, geography, history, and natural history. Students came from a number of midwestern states. With so many teachers, the school had trouble making ends meet, and in 1879 the Bethlehem elders sent a second principal, the Rev. Jesse Blickensdorfer, to replace the first, in the hope that he could make the school profitable. He reduced the number of teachers to two, but this effort also failed and the seminary was closed in 1881. In later years the buildings were used for a normal school, and then finally torn down. All that remains of the school are elaborate iron gates on the western side of Main Street, given by alumnae of the school in memory of the nature walks led by the Rev. Holland in the Spring Woods, entered where the gates stand, and the name "Seminary Street."

Hope retains many other signs of its past, and the entire downtown district is on the National Register of Historic Places, known as the Hope Historic District. The history of the town can also be traced in the town's Yellow Trail Museum, which contains two floors of historical artifacts donated by the townspeople. The town is also home to the Rural Letter Carriers' Museum (currently undergoing removal and restoration), in honor of the fact that Hope has the oldest continuously running rural mail delivery in the nation, begun in 1896.

Hope's historic past is honored in Hope Heritage Days, held every year on the last full weekend in September.

Hope was one of Indiana's smallest communities to still have its own newspaper, established in 1912 when two competing newspapers merged to create one weekly publication—the Hope Star-Journal. Upon the death of the editor in 2014, the Star-Journal converted to an online publication, at Home - HSJ Online.

Hope is home to three buildings designed by acclaimed architects: Hope Elementary (Taft Associates), Hope Branch Library (Deborah Berke), and Hope Star-Journal (Harry Weese). The latter was built as a branch of Irwin Union Bank.

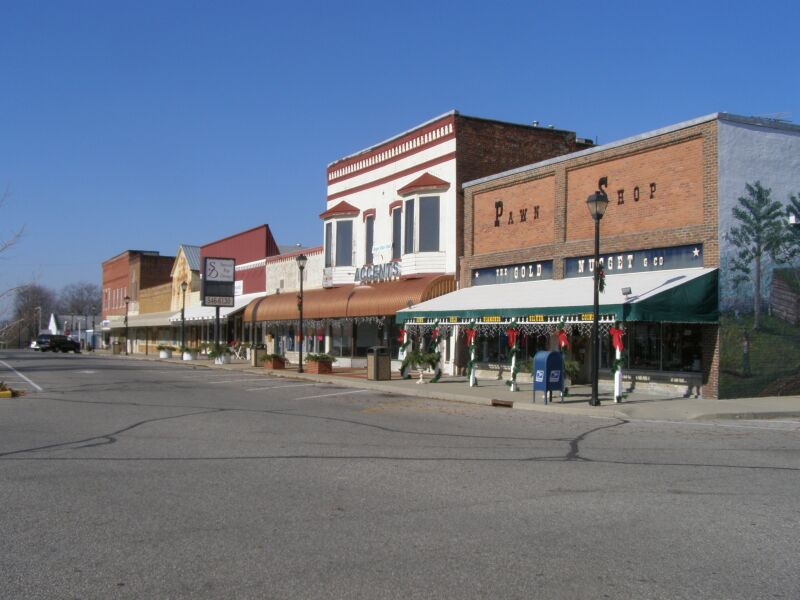
Northside of public square

== Geography ==
According to the 2010 census, Hope has a total area of 0.95 square miles (2.46 km^{2}), all land.

== Education and athletics ==
Hope is home to Hauser Junior-Senior High School (grades 7–12). It is part of the Flatrock-Hawcreek School Corporation. The school mascot is the Jets, and school colors are black and white.

The school's athletic teams have been very successful in recent years. In 2005, the boys' basketball team, coached by Bob Nobbe, were the Class A semi-state runners-up. In 2006, the boys' basketball team defeated Tri-Central to capture the Class A state championship. In 2005, the boys' baseball team were Class A state runners-up. The coach was Gerald Schoen. In 2015 the Lady Jets Softball team captured the Class A State Championship after defeating Carroll (Flora, Indiana) for the schools' first girls state championship. They were coached by Craig Sims.

Hope has a public library, a branch of the Bartholomew County Public Library.

== Demographics ==
Historical population
Census	Pop.	Note	%±
1860	527		—
1870	765		45.2%
1880	835		9.2%
1890	1,009		20.8%
1900	1,088		7.8%
1910	1,223		12.4%
1920	1,183		−3.3%
1930	1,085		−8.3%
1940	1,046		−3.6%
1950	1,215		16.2%
1960	1,489		22.6%
1970	1,603		7.7%
1980	2,185		36.3%
1990	2,171		−0.6%
2000	2,140		−1.4%
2010	2,102		−1.8%
2020	2,099		−0.1%
U.S. Decennial Census

=== 2020 census ===
As of the 2020 census, Hope had a population of 2,099. The median age was 33.7 years. 28.3% of residents were under the age of 18 and 13.2% of residents were 65 years of age or older. For every 100 females there were 98.0 males, and for every 100 females age 18 and over there were 93.9 males age 18 and over.

0.0% of residents lived in urban areas, while 100.0% lived in rural areas.

There were 811 households in Hope, of which 35.8% had children under the age of 18 living in them. Of all households, 45.4% were married-couple households, 18.7% were households with a male householder and no spouse or partner present, and 26.9% were households with a female householder and no spouse or partner present. About 27.2% of all households were made up of individuals and 11.2% had someone living alone who was 65 years of age or older.

There were 889 housing units, of which 8.8% were vacant. The homeowner vacancy rate was 1.6% and the rental vacancy rate was 13.6%.

Racial composition as of the 2020 census
Race	Number	Percent
White	1,936	92.2%
Black or African American	4	0.2%
American Indian and Alaska Native	3	0.1%
Asian	7	0.3%
Native Hawaiian and Other Pacific Islander	0	0.0%
Some other race	32	1.5%
Two or more races	117	5.6%
Hispanic or Latino (of any race)	56	2.7%

=== 2010 census ===
As of the census of 2010, there were 2,102 people, 787 households, and 561 families residing in the town. The population density was 2,212.6 inhabitants per square mile (854.3/km^{2}). There were 859 housing units at an average density of 904.2 per square mile (349.1/km^{2}). The racial makeup of the town was 97.1% White, 0.6% African American, 0.1% Native American, 0.4% Asian, 0.5% from other races, and 1.3% from two or more races. Hispanic or Latino of any race were 1.8% of the population.

There were 787 households, of which 37.2% had children under the age of 18 living with them, 52.0% were married couples living together, 13.9% had a female householder with no husband present, 5.5% had a male householder with no wife present, and 28.7% were non-families. 23.6% of all households were made up of individuals, and 9% had someone living alone who was 65 years of age or older. The average household size was 2.64 and the average family size was 3.07.

The median age in the town was 35.6 years. 25.7% of residents were under the age of 18; 11.6% were between the ages of 18 and 24; 26.2% were from 25 to 44; 25.2% were from 45 to 64; and 11.2% were 65 years of age or older. The gender makeup of the town was 49.9% male and 50.1% female.

=== 2000 census ===
As of the census of 2000, there were 2,140 people, 788 households, and 594 families residing in the town. The population density was 2,242.3 inhabitants per square mile (865.8/km^{2}). There were 849 housing units at an average density of 889.6 per square mile (343.5/km^{2}). The racial makeup of the town was 98.50% White, 0.51% African American, 0.19% from other races, and 0.79% from two or more races. Hispanic or Latino of any race were 1.40% of the population.

There were 788 households, out of which 40.5% had children under the age of 18 living with them, 57.6% were married couples living together, 11.9% had a female householder with no husband present, and 24.5% were non-families. 20.9% of all households were made up of individuals, and 11.2% had someone living alone who was 65 years of age or older. The average household size was 2.72 and the average family size was 3.13.

In the town, the population was spread out, with 30.8% under the age of 18, 9.1% from 18 to 24, 30.8% from 25 to 44, 18.4% from 45 to 64, and 10.9% who were 65 years of age or older. The median age was 32 years. For every 100 females, there were 99.3 males. For every 100 females age 18 and over, there were 90.6 males.

The median income for a household in the town was $33,347, and the median income for a family was $38,875. Males had a median income of $30,690 versus $21,681 for females. The per capita income for the town was $14,099. About 10.2% of families and 11.0% of the population were below the poverty line, including 14.2% of those under age 18 and 12.4% of those age 65 or over.

== Culture ==
The town of Hope has a strong sense of history, as reflected in its Yellow Trail Museum, its location as the site of the Haw Creek branch of the Bartholomew County Historical Society, its annual Heritage Days and Old-Fashioned Fourth of July, and a number of other traditional celebrations. The downtown Hope Historic District encompasses many nineteenth-century brick buildings and old houses, as well as one of Hope's original log cabins. Adjacent to the current school is the historic Simmons School, a one-room schoolhouse in use from 1879 to 1907, where events and reenactments are now held.

The town has an Art Guild, a non-profit foundation housed at 645 Harrison Street, which promotes local art and artists. The town has also joined in the movement to display "barn quilts," paintings of quilt squares on the sides of buildings, based originally on the hex squares, a type of Pennsylvania Dutch folk art traditionally painted to bring luck.

Hope has the only remaining Moravian church in the state of Indiana, and many of the traditional Moravian practices are also preserved, such as the display of the "putz," or elaborate Christmas scene in miniature, in the church at Christmastime, the tradition of hanging Moravian stars, and the making of Moravian sugar cakes, a type of sweet raised coffee cake widely sold at local festivals.

A more recent Mennonite presence in Hope has brought traditional Mennonite foods to local stores. Combined with the area's fresh produce and the Simmons Winery, an effort is being made to promote Hope as a center of good food traditions. A farmer's market currently runs on the town square on Friday late afternoons, from June to September. In addition a variety of fresh produce is sold from yards, farm stands, or trucks, in true rural style.

Hope is also the center of the annual Hope Ride, a bicycling event that raises funds for charity. The Hope Ride takes place each year in September, when hundreds of cyclists converge on Hope to ride short or long country loops that take in a variety of scenic features such as historic barns, churches, bridges, monuments, and a local winery.

Hope also has a dinner theater, the Actors Studio of Hope, which puts on several productions per year in the Willow Leaves venue on the town square.

Groundhog Day (February 2) is celebrated in Hope on the town square with local dignitaries in costume viewing the prediction of a local groundhog, currently Hope the Groundhog, or her brother Frank, from the local Utopia Wildlife Rehabilitators.

Hope's supporters and organizations such as Main Street of Hope have been vigorous in attracting business to the town, despite its small size. In addition to the usual amenities, town businesses include a pizza place, a Mexican restaurant, a cafe, an antique shop with a lunchroom, which also hosts the dinner theater, a salon, a funeral home, a dental office, a library, two parks, a bank, a pharmacy, a hardware store and gas stations with convenience stores.

Author Philip Gulley has a series of novels, beginning with A Place Called Hope, set in Hope, Indiana, concerning a pastor who moves to Hope to take over a Quaker congregation. Although the town in the books is called Hope, Indiana, it does not greatly resemble the real Hope and there is no Quaker congregation in the real Hope.

== Cemeteries ==
=== Moravian Cemetery ===
The Moravian Cemetery has a historic section with 1,070 graves that were organized by the choir system, separating the graves by gender and marital status. This tradition follows the custom in Herrnhut, Germany, where Moravians found sanctuary from religious persecution. The grave markers are often flat slabs because Moravians believe in equality after death. Some graves have a flat slab and a footer area for flowers, a mixture between a box tomb and a cradle, that is unique to this cemetery.

== Notable people ==
- Earl Hogan (1920–2007), U.S. representative from Indiana
