= Rockport, Indiana =

- City
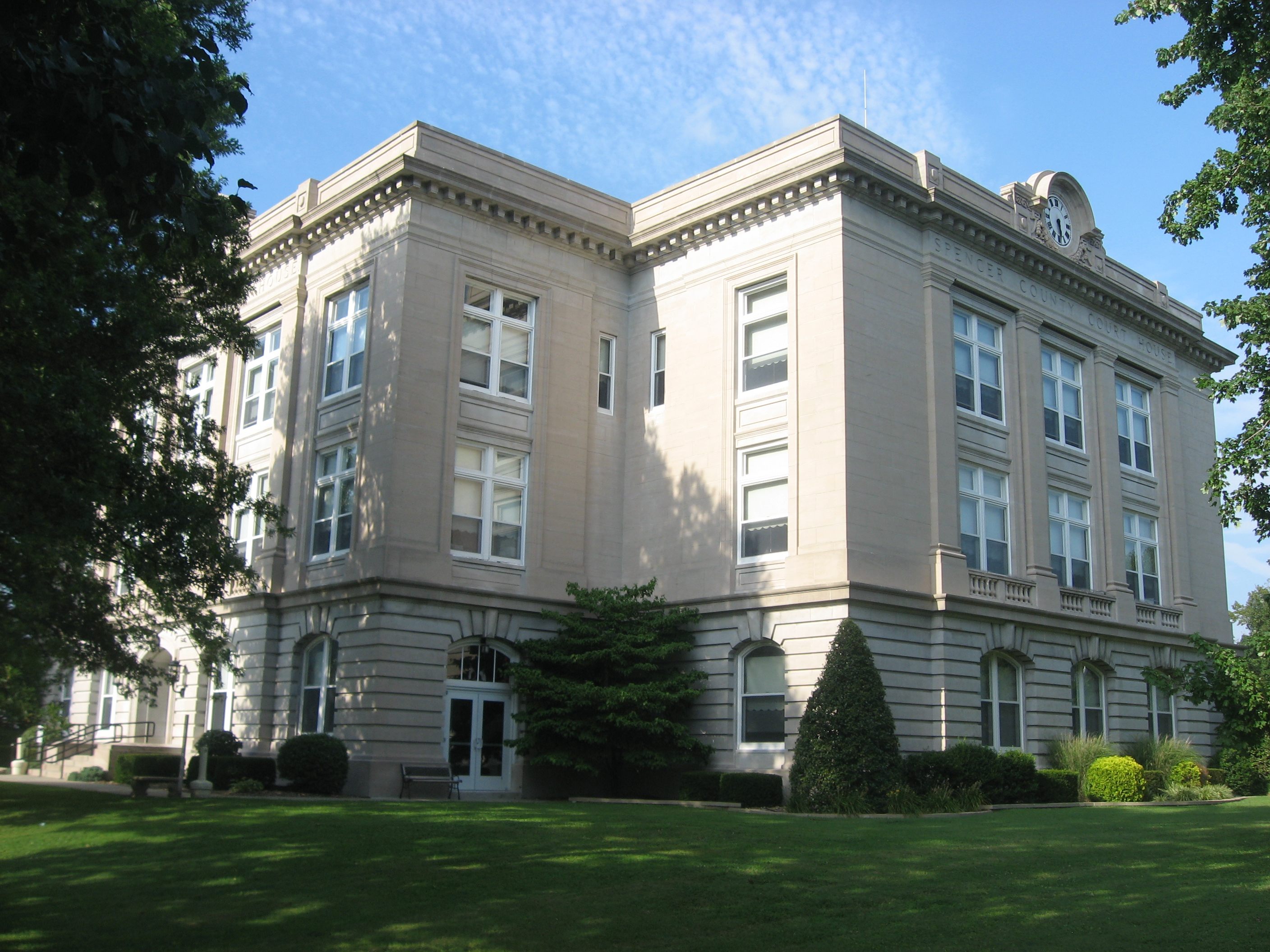
- Spencer County Courthouse

- Flag Logo

- Location of Rockport in Spencer County, Indiana.
- Coordinates: 37°53′22″N 87°03′15″W
- Country: United States
- State: Indiana
- County: Spencer
- Township: Ohio

Government
  - Mayor: Cathy Kirkpatrick (R)

Area
  - Total: 1.69 sq mi (4.37 km^{2})
  - Land: 1.66 sq mi (4.29 km^{2})
  - Water: 0.031 sq mi (0.08 km^{2}) 1.88%
- Elevation: 387 ft (118 m)

Population (2020)
  - Total: 1,984
  - Density: 1,196.8/sq mi (462.07/km^{2})
- Time zone: UTC-6 (CST)
  - Summer (DST): UTC-5 (CDT)
- ZIP code: 47635
- Area code: 812
- FIPS code: 18-65484
- GNIS feature ID: 2396408
- Website: Rockport, Indiana

Rockport is a city in Ohio Township and the county seat of Spencer County, Indiana, along the Ohio River. The population was 1,984 at the 2020 census. Once the largest community in Spencer County, the city has recently been surpassed by the town of Santa Claus. At 37°53'1" north, Rockport is also the southernmost city in the state, located slightly south of Evansville, Cannelton, or Mount Vernon (the westernmost city).

== History ==
Lots were first sold in Rockport in 1818. The town received its name from rock outcroppings on the Ohio River.

Three locations in Rockport are listed on the National Register of Historic Places: the Spencer County Courthouse, the Mathias Sharp House, and the Lincoln Pioneer Village.

The Rockport post office has been in operation since 1823.

Cleveland-Cliffs Rockport Works is located on the Ohio River near Rockport. The facility has an 80” wide galvanizing line which is the widest in the United States. The hot-dip galvanizing and galvannealing line incorporates proprietary technologies like induction transition heating, which provides rapid, accurate annealing temperature control. Rockport Works is one of the largest employers in Spencer County.

In 2013, while under the previous ownership of AK Steel, Rockport Works was reported by the EPA as the source for 70% of the pollution in the Ohio River, the nation's most polluted waterway.

== Geography ==
According to the 2010 census, Rockport has a total area of 1.604 square miles (4.15 km^{2}), of which 1.57 square miles (4.07 km^{2}) (or 97.88%) is land and 0.034 square miles (0.09 km^{2}) (or 2.12%) is water.

Rockport is nestled on the Ohio River across from Owensboro, Kentucky. It is home to the Rockport Generating Station, a coal power plant which is scheduled to close by 2028 due to the pollution it causes. It is connected to Owensboro by the William H. Natcher Bridge via U.S. Route 231.

== Demographics ==
Historical population
Census	Pop.	Note	%±
1850	412		—
1860	834		102.4%
1870	1,720		106.2%
1880	2,382		38.5%
1890	2,314		−2.9%
1900	2,882		24.5%
1910	2,736		−5.1%
1920	2,581		−5.7%
1930	2,396		−7.2%
1940	2,421		1.0%
1950	2,493		3.0%
1960	2,474		−0.8%
1970	2,565		3.7%
1980	2,590		1.0%
1990	2,315		−10.6%
2000	2,160		−6.7%
2010	2,270		5.1%
2020	1,984		−12.6%
U.S. Decennial Census

=== 2020 census ===
As of the 2020 census, Rockport had a population of 1,984. The median age was 40.8 years. 21.5% of residents were under the age of 18 and 19.5% of residents were 65 years of age or older. For every 100 females there were 91.7 males, and for every 100 females age 18 and over there were 89.6 males age 18 and over.

0.0% of residents lived in urban areas, while 100.0% lived in rural areas.

There were 875 households in Rockport, of which 27.3% had children under the age of 18 living in them. Of all households, 36.9% were married-couple households, 21.3% were households with a male householder and no spouse or partner present, and 34.2% were households with a female householder and no spouse or partner present. About 37.4% of all households were made up of individuals and 17.8% had someone living alone who was 65 years of age or older.

There were 987 housing units, of which 11.3% were vacant. The homeowner vacancy rate was 3.7% and the rental vacancy rate was 7.5%.

Racial composition as of the 2020 census
Race	Number	Percent
White	1,821	91.8%
Black or African American	37	1.9%
American Indian and Alaska Native	4	0.2%
Asian	6	0.3%
Native Hawaiian and Other Pacific Islander	0	0.0%
Some other race	22	1.1%
Two or more races	94	4.7%
Hispanic or Latino (of any race)	56	2.8%

=== 2010 census ===
As of the census of 2010, there were 2,270 people, 908 households, and 564 families living in the city. The population density was 1,445.9 inhabitants per square mile (558.3/km^{2}). There were 1,026 housing units at an average density of 653.5 per square mile (252.3/km^{2}). The racial makeup of the city was 95.9% White, 1.8% African American, 0.2% Native American, 0.3% Asian, 0.4% from other races, and 1.4% from two or more races. Hispanic or Latino of any race were 2.6% of the population. There were 908 households, of which 33.0% had children under the age of 18 living with them, 43.1% were married couples living together, 14.6% had a female householder with no husband present, 4.4% had a male householder with no wife present, and 37.9% were non-families. 33.8% of all households were made up of individuals, and 14.9% had someone living alone who was 65 years of age or older. The average household size was 2.37 and the average family size was 3.05.

The median age in the city was 39.1 years. 25.5% of residents were under the age of 18; 7.8% were between the ages of 18 and 24; 23.9% were from 25 to 44; 25.5% were from 45 to 64; and 17.3% were 65 years of age or older. The gender makeup of the city was 48.5% male and 51.5% female.

=== 2000 census ===
As of the census of 2000, there were 2,160 people, 891 households, and 571 families living in the city. The population density was 1,843.6 inhabitants per square mile (711.8/km^{2}). There were 1,057 housing units at an average density of 902.2 per square mile (348.3/km^{2}). The racial makeup of the city was 95.83% White, 2.59% African American, 0.37% Native American, 0.32% Asian, 0.19% from other races, and 0.69% from two or more races. Hispanic or Latino of any race were 1.25% of the population.

There were 891 households, out of which 31.4% had children under the age of 18 living with them, 46.2% were married couples living together, 13.5% had a female householder with no husband present, and 35.9% were non-families. 32.5% of all households were made up of individuals, and 18.7% had someone living alone who was 65 years of age or older. The average household size was 2.36 and the average family size was 2.99.

In the city, the population was spread out, with 25.0% under the age of 18, 8.6% from 18 to 24, 27.4% from 25 to 44, 20.9% from 45 to 64, and 18.1% who were 65 years of age or older. The median age was 38 years. For every 100 females, there were 87.7 males. For every 100 females age 18 and over, there were 88.4 males.

The median income for a household in the city was $27,275, and the median income for a family was $37,554. Males had a median income of $30,278 versus $20,263 for females. The per capita income for the city was $14,298. About 10.2% of families and 14.9% of the population were below the poverty line, including 19.4% of those under age 18 and 12.8% of those age 65 or over.

== Education ==
It is in the South Spencer County School Corporation. Rockport Elementary School is in Rockport.

Prior to 1965, it had its own high school. The school colors were blue and gold, and the mascot was the Zebras. That year, it merged into South Spencer High School.

There is also a Roman Catholic parochial school of the Roman Catholic Diocese of Evansville, St. Bernard Catholic School.

Rockport has a public library, a branch of Spencer County Public Library.

== Arts and culture ==
Lincoln Pioneer Village, listed on the National Register of Historic Places, is located in Rockport City Park. Designed by Indiana sculptor George Honig, the first phase of the Village was completed in 1934, with an addition completed the following year. The project was undertaken through grants from the Federal Emergency Relief Administration and Works Progress Administration, both programs of the "New Deal".

Historically accurate replicas of a number of Spencer County cabins and businesses from Abraham Lincoln's time are the main attraction of the Village, giving visitors the opportunity to see what it was like to live in Indiana during Lincoln's formative years. The Village was so well known throughout the United States in its early years that it was chosen as the setting for portions of the 1955 Burt Lancaster film The Kentuckian.

== Notable people ==
- Parrish Casebier, collegiate & professional basketball player; was raised and attended school in Rockport.
- Florence Henderson, actress, was raised and attended school in Rockport.
- Allen J. Payton (ca. 1861-62 – 1917), farmer and politician
- Thomas G. Pitcher, Union general in the Civil War born in Rockport
- Kate Milner Rabb, Indiana journalist and author; lived in Rockport in 1866. Attended High School in Rockport.
- James C. Veatch, Indiana state legislator and Union general during the Civil War; lived in Rockport at the time of his death.

== See also ==
- List of cities and towns along the Ohio River
