= Derbyshire =

- Non-metropolitan and ceremonial county
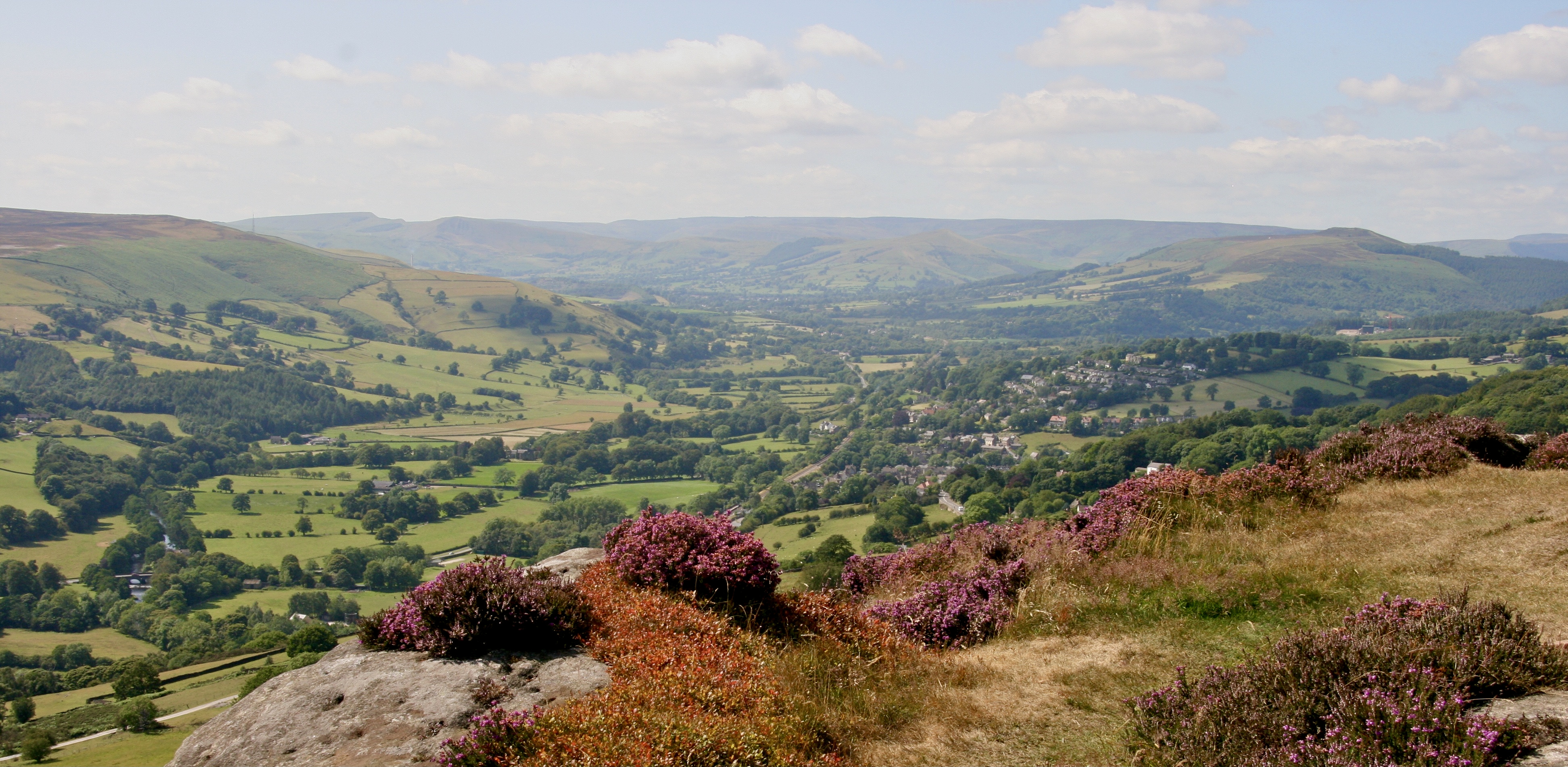
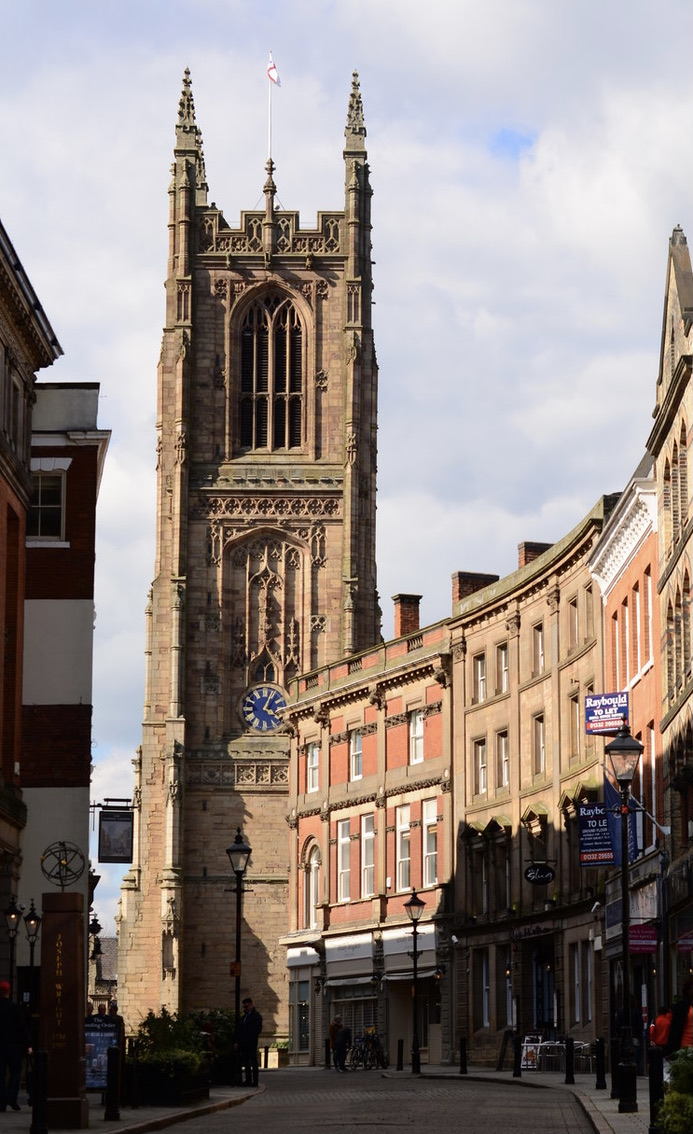
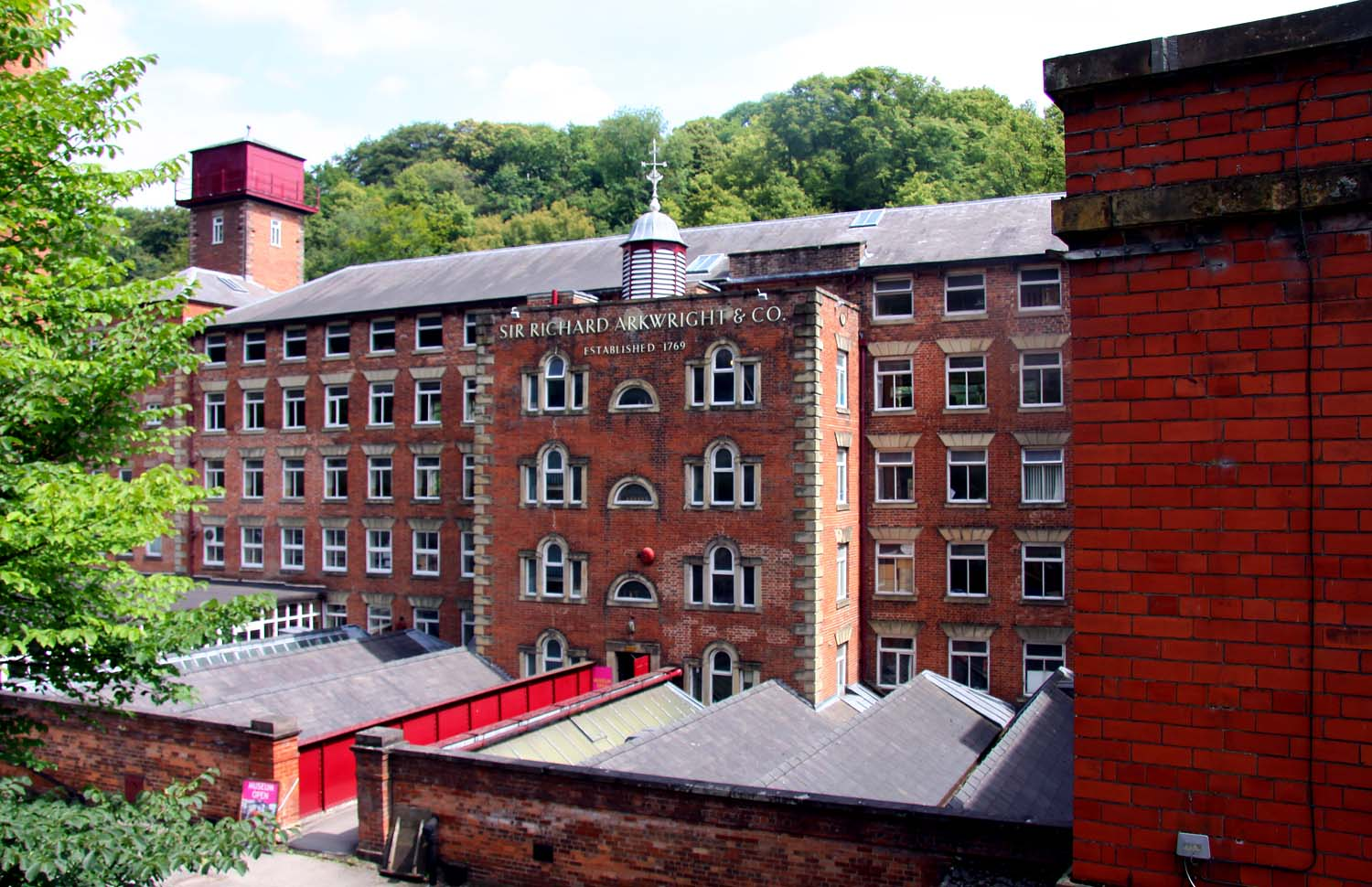
- The Peak District near Hathersage; Derby Cathedral; and Masson Mill, opened by Sir Richard Arkwright

- Ceremonial Derbyshire within England Historic Derbyshire in the British Isles
- Coordinates: 53.18°N 1.61°W
- Sovereign state: United Kingdom
- Constituent country: England
- Region: East Midlands
- Established: Ancient
- Time zone: UTC+0 (GMT)
  - Summer (DST): UTC+1 (BST)
- UK Parliament: List of MPs
- Police: Derbyshire Constabulary
- Ceremonial county
- Lord Lieutenant: Elizabeth Fothergill
- High Sheriff: Syed Yusuf Iftikhar
- Area: 2,625 km^{2} (1,014 sq mi)
  - Rank: 21st of 48
- Population (2024): 1,096,526
  - Rank: 21st of 48
  - Density: 418/km^{2} (1,080/sq mi)
- Non-metropolitan county
- County council: Derbyshire County Council
- Control: Reform UK
- Admin HQ: Matlock
- Area: 2,547 km^{2} (983 sq mi)
  - Rank: 13th of 21
- Population (2025): 827,217
  - Rank: 12th of 21
  - Density: 325/km^{2} (840/sq mi)
- ISO 3166-2: GB-DBY
- GSS code: E10000007
- ITL: UKF12, UKF13
- Website: derbyshire.gov.uk
- Districts
- Districts of Derbyshire; Unitary County council area
- Districts: List: High Peak; Derbyshire Dales; South Derbyshire; Erewash; Amber Valley; North East Derbyshire; Chesterfield; Bolsover; Derby

Derbyshire (/ˈdɑːrbiʃɪər, -ʃər/ DAR-bee-sheer, -shər) is a ceremonial county in the East Midlands of England. It borders Greater Manchester to the north-west, West Yorkshire to the north, South Yorkshire to the north and north-east, Nottinghamshire to the east, Leicestershire to the south-east, Staffordshire to the south and west, and Cheshire to the west. The city of Derby is the largest settlement.

The county has an area of 2,625 km^{2} (1,014 sq mi) and had an estimated population of 1,096,526 in 2024. The eastern half of the county is the more densely populated and contains its largest settlements: Chesterfield in the north-east, Derby in the south-east, and Swadlincote in the south. The spa town of Buxton and Glossop are located in the north-west, and Matlock near the centre. For local government purposes Derbyshire comprises a non-metropolitan county, with eight districts, and the Derby unitary authority area. The East Midlands Combined County Authority includes Derbyshire County Council and Derby City Council.

The north and centre of Derbyshire have uplands containing the majority of the Peak District, which has been designated a national park. They include Kinder Scout, at 636 m (2,087 ft) the highest point in the county. The River Derwent is the longest in the county, at 66 miles (106 km), and flows south until it meets the River Trent just south of Derby. Church Flatts Farm at Coton in the Elms, near Swadlincote, is the furthest point from the sea in the UK.

== History ==
The area that is now Derbyshire was first visited, probably briefly, by humans 200,000 years ago during the Aveley interglacial, as shown by a Middle Paleolithic Acheulean hand axe found near Hopton. Further occupation came with the Upper Paleolithic and Neolithic periods of the Stone Age when Mesolithic hunter-gatherers roamed the hilly tundra. Evidence of these nomadic tribes has been found in limestone caves located on the Nottinghamshire border. Deposits left in the caves date the occupancy at around 12,000 to 7,000 BCE.

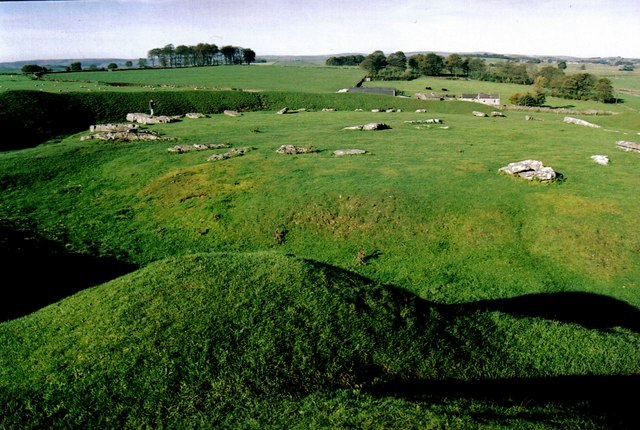
The henge monument at Arbor Low

Burial mounds of Neolithic settlers are also situated throughout the county. These chambered tombs were designed for collective burial and are mostly located in the central Derbyshire region. There are tombs at Minninglow and Five Wells that date back to between 2000 and 2500 BCE. Five kilometres west of Youlgreave lies the Neolithic henge monument of Arbor Low, which has been dated to 2500 BCE. It is not until the Bronze Age that real signs of agriculture and settlement are found in the county. In the moors of the Peak District signs of clearance, arable fields and hut circles were found after archaeological investigation. However this area and another settlement at Swarkestone are all that have been found.

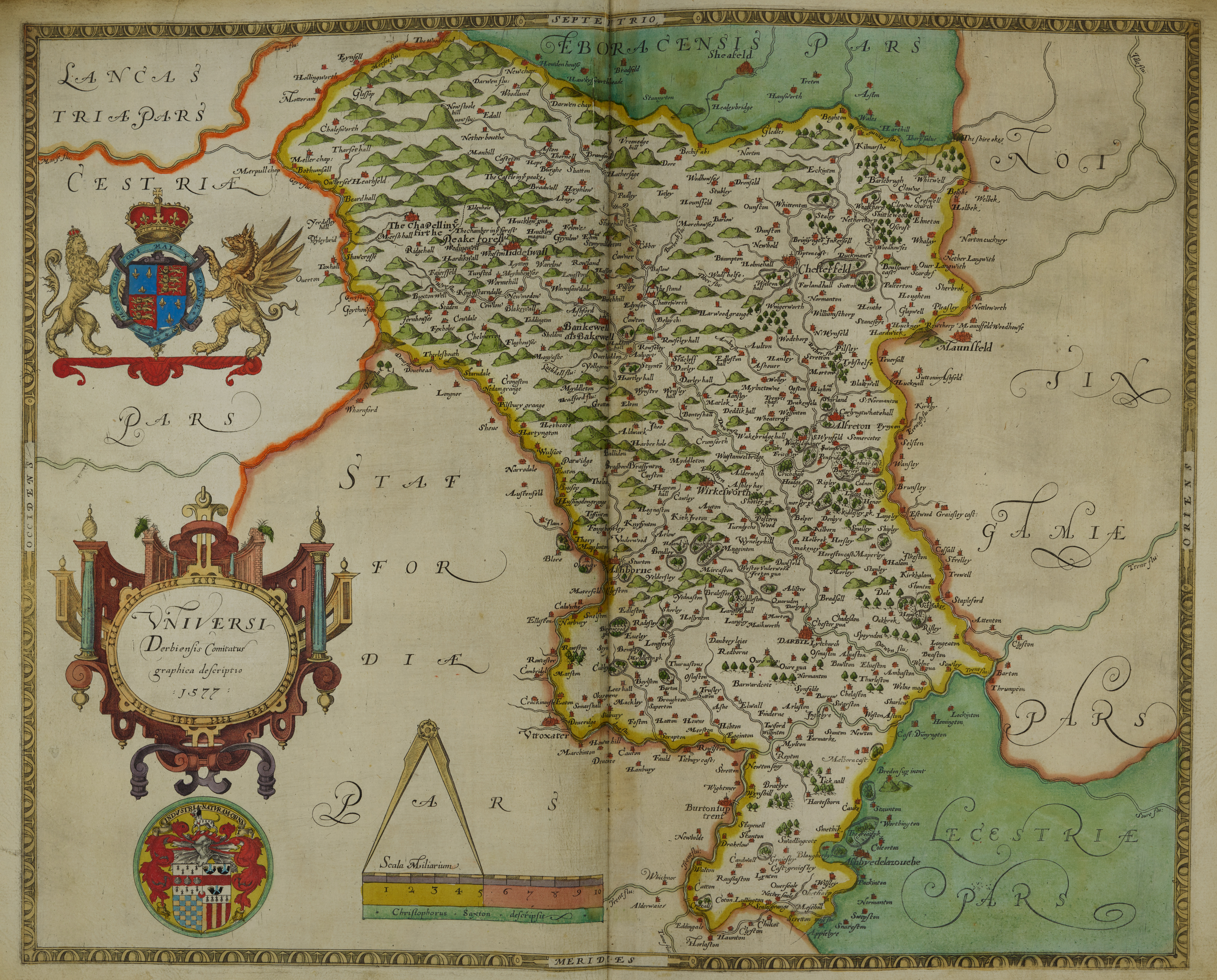
Hand-drawn map of Derbyshire by Christopher Saxton in 1577

During the Roman conquest of Britain, the invaders were attracted to Derbyshire for its lead ore in the limestone hills of the area. They settled throughout the county, with forts built near Brough in the Hope Valley and at Ardotalia near Glossop. Later they settled round Buxton, famed for its warm springs, and set up Derventio Coritanorum fort near modern-day Derby in an area now known as Little Chester.

Several kings of Mercia are buried in the Repton area.

Following the Norman Conquest, much of the county was subject to the forest laws. To the northwest was the Forest of High Peak under the custodianship of William Peverel and his descendants. The rest of the county was bestowed upon Henry de Ferrers, a part of it becoming Duffield Frith. In time the whole area was given to the Duchy of Lancaster. Meanwhile, the Forest of East Derbyshire covered the whole county to the east of the River Derwent from the reign of Henry II to that of Edward I.

== Geography ==
Derbyshire mostly consists of hilly terrain, with uplands to the north and centre of the county, and lowlands to the south and east. The southern foothills and uplands of the Pennines extend from the north of the Trent Valley and into the north of the county. The Peak District National Park covers the majority of this area and Kinder Scout is the county's highest point, at 636 m (2,087 ft). The terrain is relatively low-lying across the lower Dove Valley, from the Trent Valley and southwards, the far south of the Derwent Valley and near its eastern borders with Nottinghamshire and Leicestershire.

The main rivers in the county are the River Derwent and the River Dove which both join the River Trent in the south. The River Derwent is the longest river in the county, at 66 miles (106 km), and rises in the moorland of Bleaklow, flowing throughout the Peak District and county for the majority of its course. The River Dove rises in Axe Edge Moor and forms a boundary between Derbyshire and Staffordshire for most of its length. The county also contains Church Flatts Farm at Coton in the Elms, near Swadlincote, which is the furthest point from the sea in the UK.

=== Landscape character ===
The varied landscapes within Derbyshire have been formed mainly as a consequence of the underlying geology, but also by the way the land has been managed and shaped by human activity. The county contains 11 discrete landscape types, known as National Character Areas, which have been described in detail by Natural England and further refined, mapped and described by Derbyshire County Council and the Peak District National Park.

The 11 National Character Areas found within Derbyshire are:

- Dark Peak
- White Peak
- South West Peak
- Derbyshire Peak Fringe and Lower Derwent
- Nottinghamshire, Derbyshire and Yorkshire Coalfield
- Southern Magnesian Limestone
- Needwood and South Derbyshire Claylands
- Trent Valley Washlands
- Melbourne Parklands
- Leicestershire & South Derbyshire Coalfield
- Mease/Sence Lowlands

=== Geology ===
Derbyshire's solid geology can be split into two very different halves. The oldest rocks occur in the northern, more upland half of the county, and are mostly of Carboniferous age, comprising limestones, gritstones, sandstones and shales. In its north-east corner to the east of Bolsover, there are also Magnesian Limestone rocks of Permian age. In contrast, the southern and more lowland half of Derbyshire contains much softer rocks, mainly mudstones and sandstones of Permo-Triassic age, which create gentler, more rolling landscapes with few rock outcrops. Across both regions can be found drift deposits of Quaternary age – mainly terrace and river gravel deposits and boulder clays. Landslip features are found on unstable layers of sandstones and shales, with Mam Tor and Alport Castles being the best-known. Cemented screes and tufa deposits occur very rarely in the limestone dales and rivers, whilst cave systems have been created naturally in the limestone since Pleistocene times. A recently discovered cave chamber near Castleton, named Titan, is the deepest shaft and biggest chamber of any cave in Britain.

The oldest rocks are Lower Carboniferous limestones of Dinantian age, which form the core of the White Peak within the Peak District National Park. Because northern Derbyshire is effectively an uplifted dome of rock layers that have subsequently eroded to expose older rocks in the centre of the Derbyshire Dome, these are encircled by progressively younger limestone rocks, until they in turn give way on three sides to Upper Carboniferous shales, gritstones and sandstones of Namurian age.

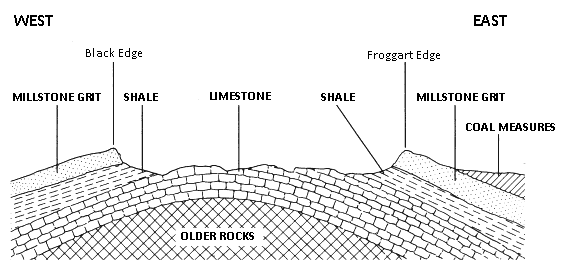
A cross-section of northern Derbyshire, from west to east, showing the approximate structure of an eroded dome, with younger Coal Measure rocks to the east, and older limestone exposed in the centre

Younger still are the sandstones, shales and coal deposits found on the eastern flank of Derbyshire, forming the coal measures, which are of Westphalian age. All these rock layers disappear south of a line drawn between Ashbourne and Derby under layers of clays and sandstones (Mercia Mudstone Group and Sherwood Sandstones) of Permo-Triassic age. Small amounts of carboniferous limestones, gritstones and coal measures reappear in the far south of Derbyshire from Ticknall (limestone) to Swadlincote (coal measures).

Some areas of the White Peak exhibit contemporaneous basalt flows (e.g. Ravens Tor at Millers Dale), as well as subsequent dolerite sill intrusion at a much later stage (e.g. near Tideswell Dale), whilst mineralisation of the carboniferous limestone in a subsequent period created extensive lead and fluorite deposits which have formed a significant part of Derbyshire's economy, as did coal mining. Lead mining has been important here since Roman Times. The more recent river gravels of the Trent valley remain a significant extractive industry today in south Derbyshire, as does the mining of limestone rock in central and northern parts of the county. Coarse sandstones were once extensively quarried both for local building materials and for the production of gritstone grinding wheels for use in mills, and both former industries have left their mark on the Derbyshire landscape.

=== Green belts ===
Green belts in Derbyshire and beyond. Clockwise from top left: North West Green Belt; South and West Yorkshire Green Belt; Nottingham and Derby Green Belt; Burton upon Trent and Swadlincote Green Belt; West Midlands Green Belt; Stoke-on-Trent Green Belt

As well as the protections afforded to the Peak District area under national and local policies, there are several green belts within the county, aimed at preserving the landscape surrounding main urban areas. There are four such areas, the first three being portions of much larger green belts that extend outside the county and surround large conurbations:

Derbyshire green belt area	Part of the larger	Communities contained within	Communities on the outskirts
North West Derbyshire Green Belt	North West Green Belt for Manchester	Glossop, Hadfield, Charlesworth, Furness Vale, New Mills	Hayfield, Chinley, Whaley Bridge
North East Derbyshire Green Belt	South and West Yorkshire Green Belt for Sheffield	Dronfield, Eckington, Killamarsh, High Lane/Ridgeway, Holymoorside	Chesterfield, Staveley, Barlborough
South East Derbyshire Green Belt	Nottingham and Derby Green Belt for Derby/Nottingham	Ilkeston, Long Eaton, Heanor, Ripley, Borrowash, Duffield, West Hallam	Belper, Derby
South Derbyshire Green Belt	Burton upon Trent and Swadlincote Green Belt	Stanhope Bretby, Stanton	Burton-upon-Trent, Swadlincote

== Ecology ==
Because of its central location in England and altitude range from 27 metres in the south to 636 metres in the north, Derbyshire contains many species at the edge of their UK distribution ranges. Some species with a predominantly northern British distribution are at the southern limit of their range, whilst others with a more southern distribution are at their northern limit in Derbyshire. As climate change progresses, a number of sensitive species are now being seen to be either expanding or contracting their range as a result. For the purposes of protecting and recording the county's most important habitats, Derbyshire has been split into two regions, each with its own Biodiversity Action Plan (BAP), based around National Character Areas. The Peak District BAP includes all of Derbyshire's uplands of the Dark Peak, South-West Peak and White Peak, including an area of limestone beyond the national park boundary. The remaining areas are monitored and recorded in the Lowland Derbyshire Biodiversity Action Plan, which subdivides the landscape into eight smaller Action Areas.

The Derbyshire Biological Records Centre was formerly based at Derby Museum and Art Gallery, but since 2011 has been managed by Derbyshire Wildlife Trust. Two of the 48 English Local Nature Partnerships (LNP) also cover Derbyshire; these are the Peak District LNP and the Lowland Derbyshire & Nottinghamshire LNP.

In October 2025, Derbyshire County Council approved Derbyshire's Local Nature Recovery Strategy, which outlines how nature recovery will be supported and implemented across the county.

=== Botany ===
Since 2002, the county flower for Derbyshire has been Jacob's-ladder (Polemonium caeruleum), a relatively rare species, and characteristic of certain limestone dales in the White Peak. Derbyshire is known to have contained 1,919 separate taxa of vascular plants (including species, hybrids and micro-species) since modern recording began, of which 1,133 are known to be either native or archaeophyte, the remainder being non-native species. These comprise 336 established species, 433 casuals and 17 unassigned. It is known that 34 species of plants once native here have been lost from Derbyshire (i.e. become locally extinct) since modern plant recording began in the 17th century. Derbyshire contains two endemic vascular plants, found nowhere else in the world: Rubus durescens, a bramble occurring in central Derbyshire, and Derby hawkweed (Hieracium naviense), still known only from Winnats Pass. One endemic species of moss, Derbyshire Feather Moss, occurs in one small 3-metre patch in just one Derbyshire limestone dale, its sole world location intentionally kept confidential.

The distribution and status of vascular plants in Derbyshire have been recorded over the last 120 years in a series of four major botanical works, each by different authors between 1889 and 2015, all entitled The Flora of Derbyshire. Plant recording is mainly undertaken locally by volunteers from the Derbyshire Flora Group, and by staff at Derbyshire Wildlife Trust and the Peak District National Park.

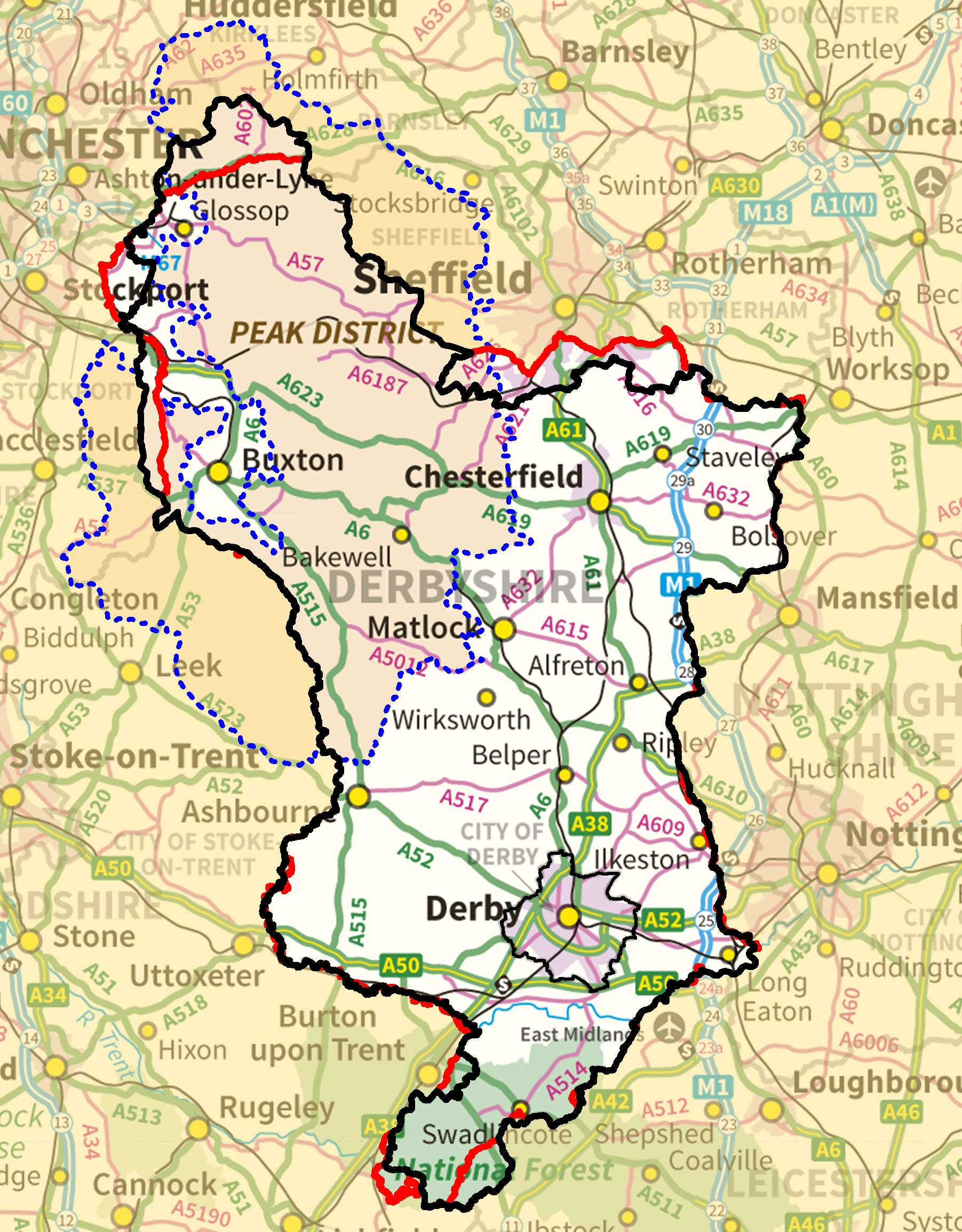
Map of Derbyshire boundaries with Peak District also shown. Black=modern Geographic boundary, Red=Vice-county boundary (VC57) where this differs from modern; Dotted Blue=Peak District boundary

The Dark Peak is marked by heathlands, bogs, gritstone edges and acid grasslands containing relatively few species, with plants such as heather (Calluna vulgaris), crowberry (Empetrum nigrum), bilberry (Vaccinium myrtillus) and hare's-tail cotton grass (Eriophorum vaginatum) being dominant on the high moors. The dales of the White Peak are known for habitats such as calcareous grassland, ash woodlands and rock outcrops in all of which a much greater richness of lime-loving species occurs than elsewhere in the county. These include various orchids (such as early purple orchid (Orchis mascula), dark-red helleborine (Epipactis atrorubens) and fly orchid (Ophrys insectifera)), common rockrose (Helianthemum nummularium), spring cinquefoil (Helianthemum nummularium) and grass of parnassus (Parnassia palustris). Specialised communities of plants occur on former lead workings, where typical metallophyte species include spring sandwort (Minuartia verna), alpine penny-cress (Thlaspi caerulescens) (both known locally in Derbyshire as Leadwort), as well as mountain pansy (Viola lutea) and moonwort (Botrychium lunaria).

In 2015, Derbyshire contained 304 vascular plant species now designated as of international, national or local conservation concern, for their rarity or recent declines, and collectively listed as Derbyshire Red Data plants. Work on recording and publishing a bryophyte flora for Derbyshire still continues: by 2012 a total of 518 bryophyte species had been recorded for the county.

Botanical recording in the UK predominantly uses the unchanging vice-county boundary system, which results in a slightly different map of Derbyshire from the modern geographic county.

=== Zoology ===
A number of specialist organisations protect, promote and monitor records of individual animal groups across Derbyshire. The main ones are Derbyshire Ornithological Society; Derbyshire Mammal Group; Derbyshire Bat Group, Derbyshire Amphibian and Reptile Group, and the Derbyshire & Nottingham Entomological Society. All maintain databases of wildlife sightings, whilst some such as the Derbyshire Ornithological Society provide alerts of rare sightings on their websites or social media pages and also publish major works describing the status and distribution of species.

== Economy ==
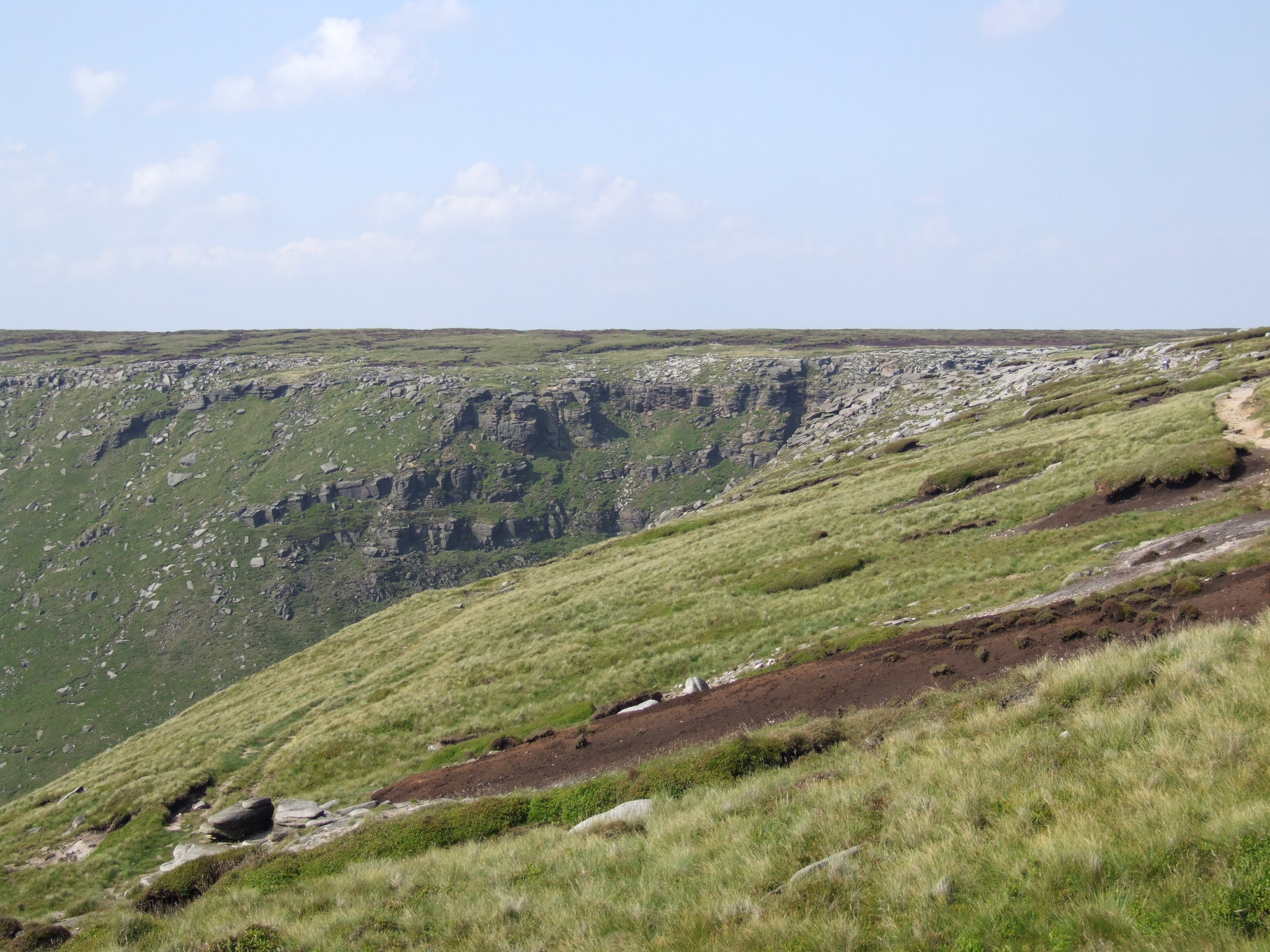
The rugged moorland edge of the southern Pennines at Kinder Downfall

Derbyshire has a mixture of a rural economy in the west, with a former coal-mining economy in the north-east (Bolsover district), the Erewash Valley around Ilkeston and in the south around Swadlincote. The rural landscape varies from arable farmland in the flatlands to the south of Derby, to upland pasture and moorland in the high gritstone uplands of the southern Pennines.

Derbyshire is rich in natural mineral resources such as lead, iron, coal, and limestone, which have been exploited over a long period. Lead, for example, has been mined since Roman times. The limestone outcrops in the central area led to the establishment of large quarries to supply the industries of surrounding towns with lime for building and steelmaking, and latterly in the 20th-century cement manufacture. The Industrial Revolution also increased demand for building stone, and in the late 19th and early 20th-century, the arrival of the railways led to a large number of stone quarries being established. This industry has left its mark on the countryside, but is still a major industry: a lot of the stone is supplied as crushed stone for road building and concrete manufacture, and is moved by rail.

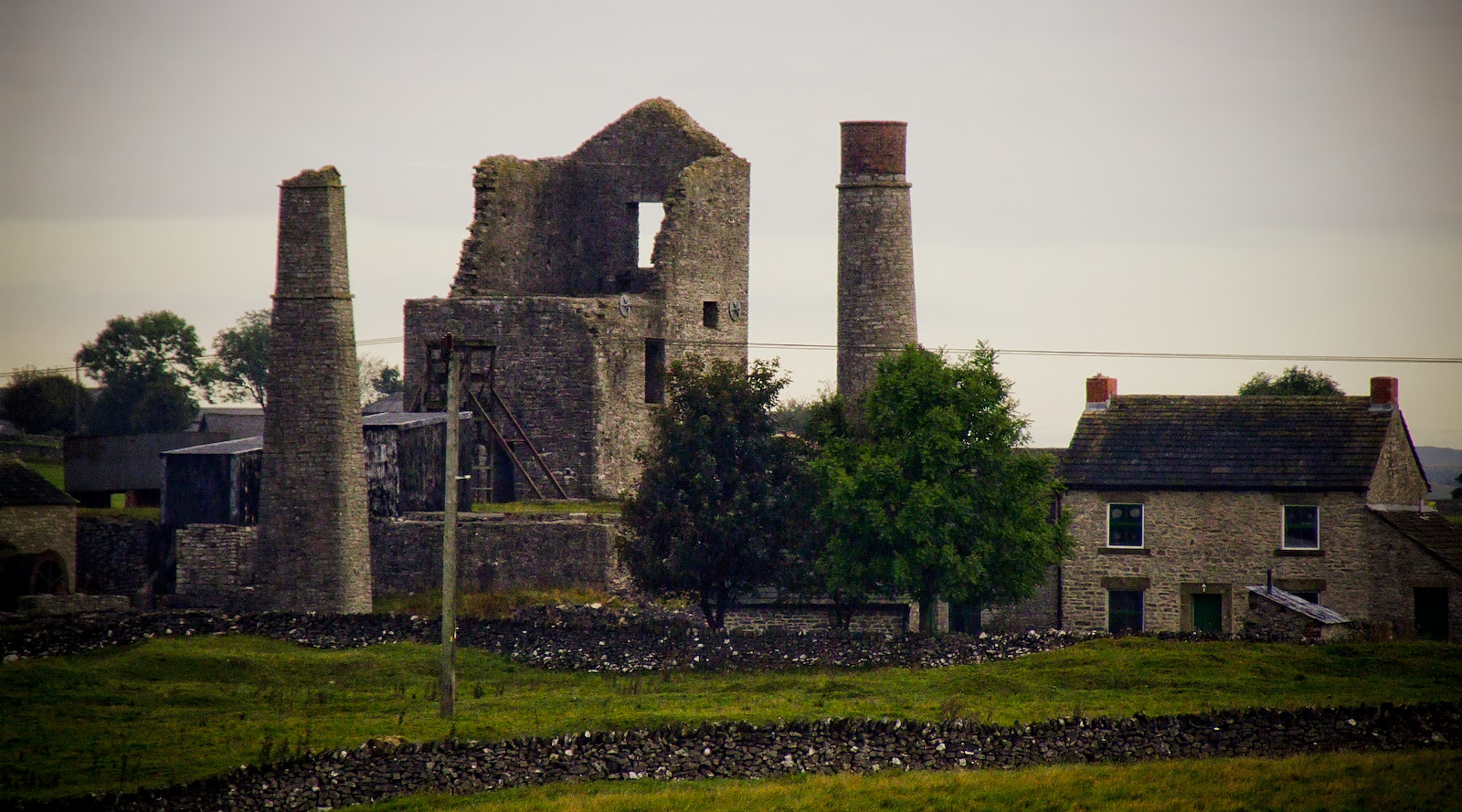
The ruins of the Magpie Mine near Sheldon

Derbyshire's relative remoteness in the late 18th century and an abundance of fast-flowing streams led to a proliferation of the use of hydropower at the beginning of the Industrial Revolution, following the mills pioneered by Richard Arkwright. Derbyshire has been said to be the home of the Industrial Revolution, and part of the Derwent Valley has been given World Heritage status in acknowledgement of this historic importance.

Nationally famous companies in Derbyshire include Rolls-Royce, one of the world's leading aerospace companies, based since before World War I in Derby, Thorntons just south of Alfreton and Toyota, who have one of the UK's largest car manufacturing plants at Burnaston. Ashbourne Water used to be bottled in Buxton by Nestlé Waters UK until 2006 and Buxton Water still is.

Derbyshire is one of only three counties permitted to make cheese that is labelled as Stilton cheese. The others are Leicestershire and Nottinghamshire. The smallest of six companies making this product is Hartington Creamery at Pikehall. As of March 2021, Hartington Stilton was marketing within the UK but also exporting to the US, EU and Canada. The company director told the BBC that they had "a surge in interest and consumer sales from the US".

== Governance ==
Derbyshire parliamentary constituencies 2024 general election result

The county is divided into eleven constituencies for the election of members of parliament (MPs) to the House of Commons. In the 2024 United Kingdom general election, all seats in Derbyshire were won by the Labour Party, including the seat of Derbyshire Dales, a Conservative safe seat that had not been won by Labour since the 1945 election.

Shown below are the vote and seat count at the 2019 election compared to the 2024 election:

	Conservative	Labour	Liberal Democrats	Reform UK (formerly Brexit Party)	Green	Others
Votes won 2019	277,723 (52.3%)	184,295 (34.7%)	38,253 (7.2%)	13,658 (2.6%)	2,711 (0.5%)	14,487 (2.7%)
Seats won 2019	9 ▲3	2 ▼3	0	0	0	0
Votes Won 2024	117,424 (24.9%)	195,568 (41.5%)	24,897 (5.3%)	94,292 (20%)	30,348 (6.4%)	9,101 (1.9%)
Seats won 2024	0 ▼9	11 ▲9	0	0	0	0

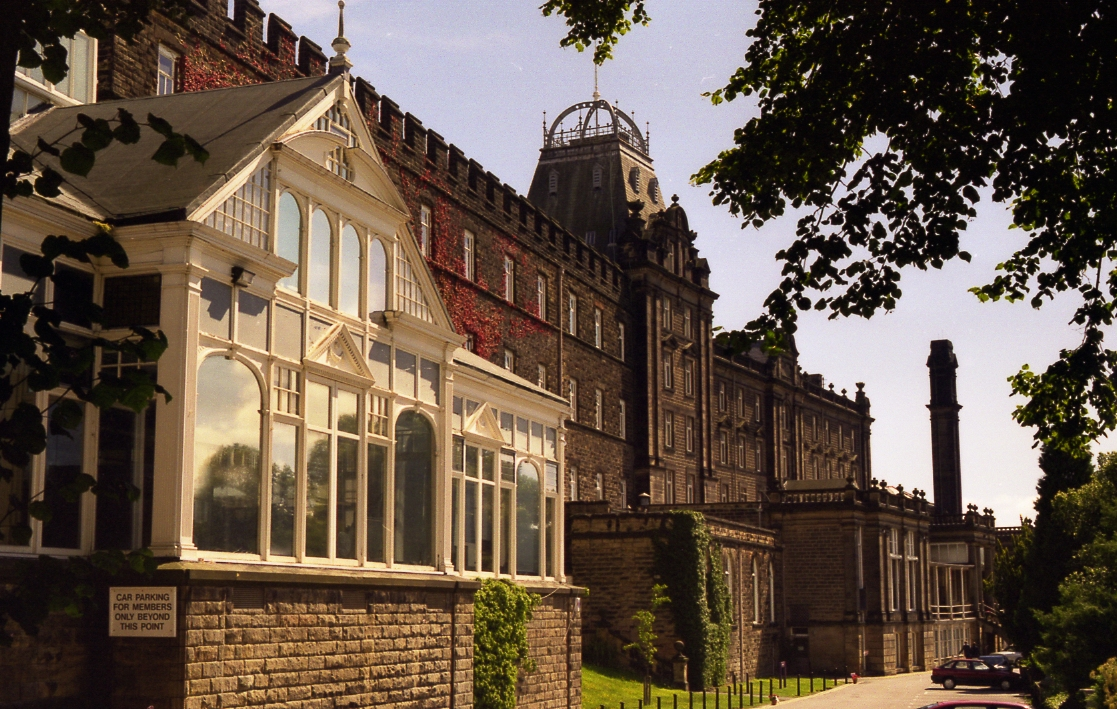
County Hall, Matlock

Derbyshire has a three-tier local government since the local government reorganisation in 1974. It has a county council based in Matlock and eight district councils and since 1997, a unitary authority area of the City of Derby. Derby remains part of Derbyshire only for ceremonial purposes.

Derbyshire has become fractionally smaller during government reorganisation over the years. The Sheffield suburbs Woodseats, Beauchief, Handsworth, Woodhouse, Norton, Mosborough, Totley, Bradway and Dore were previously parts of the county, but were lost to Sheffield between 1900 and 1933; Mosborough was transferred in 1967. However, Derbyshire gained part of the Longdendale valley and Tintwistle from Cheshire in 1974. The current area of the geographic/ceremonial county of Derbyshire is only 4.7 square kilometres less than it was over 100 years ago.

At the third tier are the parish councils, which do not cover all areas. The eight district councils in Derbyshire and the unitary authority of Derby are shown in the map above.

Pre- and post-1974 districts and boroughs

These district councils are responsible for local planning and building control, local roads, council housing, environmental health, markets and fairs, refuse collection and recycling, cemeteries and crematoria, leisure services, parks, and tourism. Education, social services, libraries, main roads, public transport, policing and fire services, trading standards, waste disposal and strategic planning are the responsibility of the County Council.

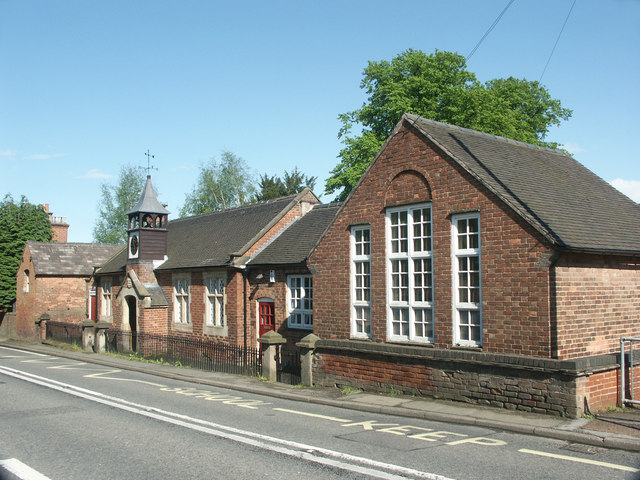
One of many Victorian village schools in Derbyshire

Although Derbyshire is in the East Midlands, some parts, such as High Peak (which incorporated former areas of Cheshire after boundary changes in 1974), the Borough of Chesterfield and North East Derbyshire are closer to the northern cities of Manchester and Sheffield and these receive services more affiliated with northern England; for example, the North West Ambulance Service, Granada Television, BBC Look North and United Utilities.Outside the main city of Derby, the largest town in the county is Chesterfield.

Derbyshire is also part of multiple combined authorities. The Erewash, Amber Valley and Derby districts are part of the D2N2 partnership with neighbouring Nottinghamshire. The Derbyshire Dales, Bolsover, North East Derbyshire and Chesterfield districts are part of the South Yorkshire Mayoral Combined Authority (as non constituent members).

Derbyshire County Council and Derby City Council are part of the East Midlands Combined Authority, and elected the first Mayor of the East Midlands in the 2024 East Midlands Mayoral Election.

=== Future ===
In July 2026, the UK Government announced that it intends to reorganise Derbyshire into two unitary authority areas by April 2028. The county will be divided north–south, with Derbyshire North combining the current districts of Bolsover, Chesterfield, Derbyshire Dales, High Peak, North East Derbyshire, and the northern part of Amber Valley, and Derbyshire South combining Derby, Erewash, South Derbyshire, and the southern part of Amber Valley. Elections to the new unitary councils will take place in May 2027.

== Education ==
The Derbyshire school system is comprehensive with no selective schools. The independent sector includes Repton School, Trent College and The Elms School.

In terms of higher education, Derbyshire is home to the University of Derby, and one of the University of Nottingham's medical school campuses.

== Settlements ==
The major settlements of Derbyshire.
A recently established (mid 1990s and onwards) new town type settlement, which continues to undergo planned expansion. – Green.

There are several towns in the county, with Derby the largest and most populous. At the time of the 2011 census, a population of 770,600 lived in the county with 248,752 (32%) living in Derby.

Although Derbyshire is officially part of the East Midlands statistical region, parts of the county are often considered to be culturally in Northern England, such as Chesterfield and Glossop.

Towns in Derbyshire with over 10,000 inhabitants.
Rank	Town	Population	Borough/District	Notes
1	Derby	248,752 (2011)	City of Derby	
2	Chesterfield	103,788 (2011)	Chesterfield	
3	Long Eaton	45,000	Erewash	
4	Ilkeston	38,640 (2011)	Erewash	
5	Swadlincote	36,000 (2004)	South Derbyshire	
6	Belper	21,823 (2011)	Amber Valley	Figure is for Belper civil parish, which includes Milford and Blackbrook
7	Dronfield	21,261 (2011)	North East Derbyshire	Figure is for Dronfield civil parish, which includes Dronfield Woodhouse and Coal Aston
8	Buxton	20,836 (2001)	High Peak	
9	Ripley	20,807 (2011)	Amber Valley	Figure is for Ripley civil parish, which includes Heage, Ambergate and Waingroves
10	Staveley	18,247 (2011)	Chesterfield	Figure is for Staveley civil parish, which includes Mastin Moor, Duckmanton, Inkersall Green and Hollingwood
11	Glossop	17,576 (2011)	High Peak	Figure is for the electoral wards of Howard Town, Old Glossop, Dinting, Simmondley and Whitfield.
12	Heanor	17,251 (2011)	Amber Valley	Figure is for Heanor and Loscoe civil parish, which includes Loscoe but excludes Heanor Gate
13	Bolsover	11,673 (2011)	Bolsover	Figure is for Old Bolsover civil parish, which includes Shuttlewood, Stanfree and Whaley, but excludes part of Hillstown.
14	Eckington	11,855 (2011)	North East Derbyshire	Figure is for Eckington civil parish, which includes Renishaw, Spinkhill, Marsh Lane and Ridgeway.

=== Historic areas ===
During a series of administrative boundary changes during the 20th century, settlements which were historically part of the county now fall under the administrative areas of Greater Manchester, South Yorkshire, and Staffordshire:

Cheshire/Greater Manchester	Marple Bridge, Mellor
South Yorkshire	Mosborough, Totley, Dore
Staffordshire	Winshill, Stapenhill, Edingale (Part)

Numerous other boundary changes also took place during the course of the 19th century, with county settlements being ceded to the counties of Staffordshire and Leicestershire

== Media ==
Because of the size of the county, southern parts of Derbyshire such as Derby, Matlock, Ashbourne and Bakewell are covered by BBC East Midlands and ITV Central in Nottingham, broadcast from Waltham transmitting station. Northeast Derbyshire, Chesterfield, the eastern High Peak (Hope Valley) and northern area of the Derbyshire Dales (Tideswell and Hathersage) are covered by ITV Yorkshire and BBC Yorkshire from Emley Moor transmitting station, with their ITV News Calendar and Look North programmes, both from Leeds. The western area of the High Peak (Buxton, Glossop, New Miils and Chapel-en-le-Frith) is covered by BBC North West from Winter Hill transmitting station and ITV Granada, both based in Salford.

BBC Local Radio for the county is provided by BBC Radio Derby, BBC Radio Sheffield (covering Chesterfield and Bolsover) and BBC Radio Manchester (covering Glossop, New Mills and Chapel-en-le-Frith).

County-wide commercial radio stations are Capital Midlands, Hits Radio East Midlands, Gold, Greatest Hits Radio East Midlands and Greatest Hits Radio Yorkshire (for Chesterfield, Matlock and Bakewell).

== Sport ==
Derbyshire has two Football League teams, Derby County, who play in the EFL Championship, the second tier of English football. The next highest-placed team is Chesterfield, who participate in EFL League Two, the fourth tier of English football. There are also many non-league teams playing throughout the county, most notably Alfreton Town, who play in the Northern Premier League. The county is currently home to the world's oldest football club, Sheffield F.C., who play in Dronfield in north-east Derbyshire. Glossop was the smallest town in the country to have a football team in the top tier of English football, Glossop North End.

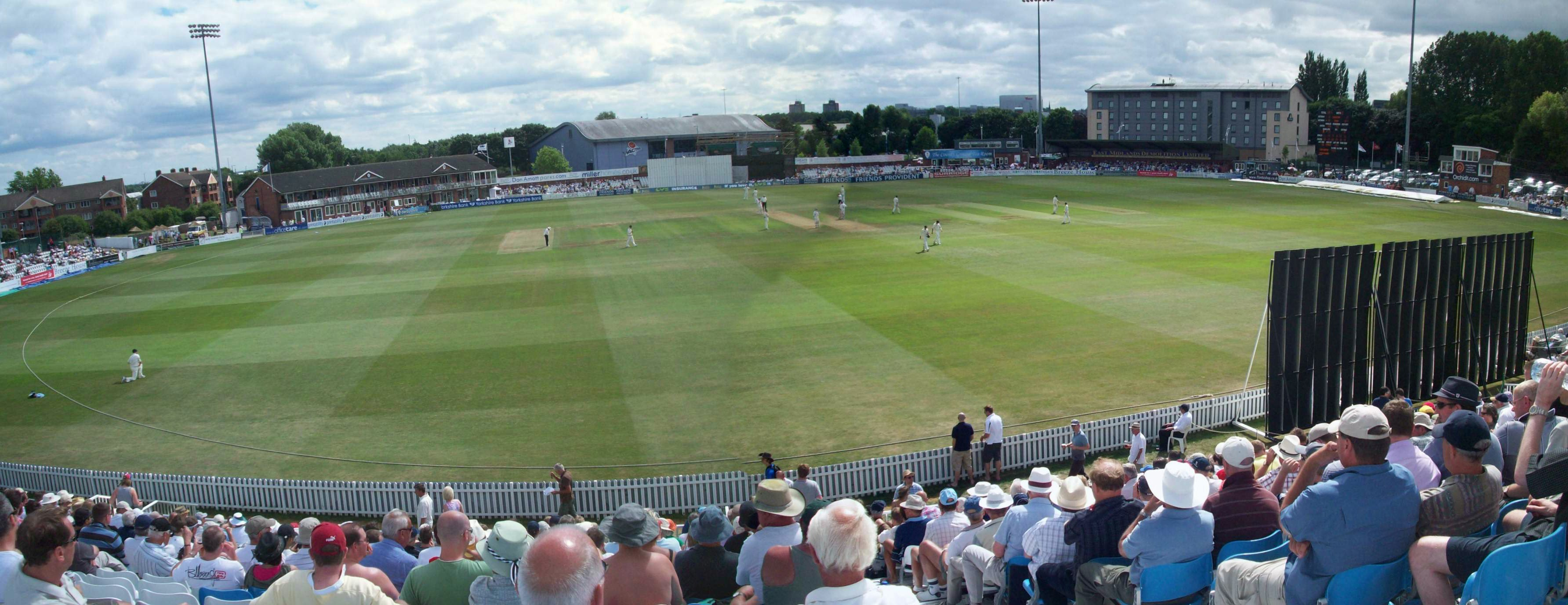
County Cricket Ground, in Derby

Derbyshire has a cricket team based at the County Cricket Ground. Derbyshire County Cricket Club currently play in Division Two of the County Championship. There are also rugby league clubs based in the north of the county, the North Derbyshire Chargers and in Derby (Derby City RLFC). The county has numerous rugby union clubs, including Derby, Chesterfield Panthers, Matlock, Ilkeston, Ashbourne, Bakewell and Amber Valley.

The county is a popular area for a variety of recreational sports such as rock climbing, hill walking, hang gliding, caving, sailing on its many reservoirs, and cycling along the many miles of disused rail tracks that have been turned into cycle trails, such as the Monsal Trail and High Peak Trail.

The town of Ashbourne in Derbyshire is known for its Royal Shrovetide Football, described as a "medieval football game", played annually on Shrove Tuesday and Ash Wednesday.

Derbyshire is host to one of the only community Muggle quidditch teams in the country, known as Derby Union Quidditch Club. The Club recruits players from the age of 16 upwards from all over Derby, and has representatives from most local sixth forms and the University of Derby. The team has competed against both the Leeds Griffins and the Leicester Lovegoods in the past and is part of the vibrant UK quidditch scene. It is also an official International Quidditch Association team.

== Local attractions ==
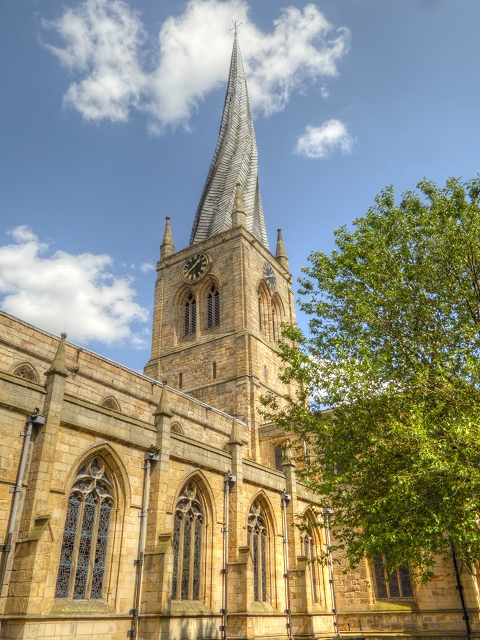
The 'twisted spire' on Chesterfield parish church

The county of Derbyshire has many attractions for tourists and local people. It offers Peak District scenery such as Mam Tor and Kinder Scout, and more urban attractions such as Bakewell, Buxton and Derby. Such places include Bolsover Castle, Castleton, Chatsworth House, Hopton Hall, National Tramway Museum at Crich, Peak Rail steam railway, Midland Railway steam railway, Dovedale, Haddon Hall, the Heights of Abraham and Matlock Bath.

In the north of the county, three large reservoirs, Howden, Derwent and Ladybower, were built in the early part of the 20th century to supply the rapidly growing populations of Sheffield, Derby and Leicester with drinking water. The moorland catchment area around these is part of the Peak District National Park and extensively used for leisure pursuits such as walking and cycling.

There are many properties and lands in the care of the National Trust that are open to the public, such as Calke Abbey, Hardwick Hall, High Peak Estate, Ilam Park, Kedleston Hall, Longshaw Estate near Hathersage, and Sudbury Hall on the Staffordshire border.

Notable gardens in Derbyshire include the formal ones in 17th–18th-century French style at Melbourne Hall south of Derby, the listed garden at Renishaw Hall near Eckington, Lea Rhododendron Gardens near Matlock, the Royal Horticultural Society recommended Bluebell Arboretum near Swadlincote, and the extensive gardens at Chatsworth House.

Ardotalia, also known as Melandra, or Melandra Castle, is an ancient Roman fort built in the north-west of the county. The ruins and foundations are open free of charge to the public.

== County emblems ==
The flag of the historic county of Derbyshire

As part of a 2002 marketing campaign, the plant conservation charity Plantlife chose the Jacob's-ladder as the county flower.

In September 2006, a proposal for a Derbyshire county flag was introduced, largely on the initiative of BBC Radio Derby. It consists of a white-bordered dark green cross encompassing a golden Tudor rose (a historical symbol of the county) all set in a blue field. The blue field represents the many waters of the county, its rivers and reservoirs, while the cross is green to mark the great areas of countryside. The flag was subsequently registered with the Flag Institute in September 2008.

In 2015, BBC Radio Derby commissioned a Derbyshire anthem entitled "Our Derbyshire", including lyrics suggested by its listeners. It received its first performance on 17 September 2015 at Derby Cathedral.

== Demographics ==
Derbyshire compared
UK Census 2011	Derby	Derbyshire	East Midlands	England
Total population	248,752	769,686	4,533,222	53,012,456
Foreign born (outside Europe)	9.3%	1.4%	6.4%	9.3%
White	80.2%	97.5%	89.3%	85.5%
Asian	12.6%	1.1%	6.4%	7.7%
Black	3.0%	0.4%	1.7%	3.4%
Christian	52.7%	63.6%	58.8%	59.4%
Muslim	7.6%	0.3%	3.1%	5.0%
Hindu	0.9%	0.2%	2.0%	1.5%
No religion	27.6%	28.0%	27.5%	24.7%
Over 65	15.1%	18.6%	17.1%	16.3%
Unemployed	5.2%	3.9%	4.2%	4.4%

In 1801 the population was 147,481 This had grown to 272,217 inhabitants by the time of the 1841 census. According to the UK Census 2001 there were 956,301 people spread over the county's 254,615 hectares. This was estimated to have risen to 990,400 in 2006.

The county's population grew by 3.0 per cent from 1991 to 2001 which is around 21,100 people. This figure is higher than the national average of 2.65 per cent, but lower than the East Midlands average of 4.0 per cent. The county as a whole has an average population density of 2.9 people per hectare, making it less densely populated than England as a whole. The density varies throughout the county, with the lowest being in the region of Derbyshire Dales at 0.88 per hectare, and the highest outside the main cities in the region of Erewash, which has 10.04 people per hectare.

Population since 1801
Year	1801	1851	1901	1911	1921	1931	1939	1951	1961	1971	1981	1991	2001	2011
Derbyshire non-metropolitan county	132,786	223,414	465,896	542,697	565,826	590,470	613,301	637,645	651,284	666,013	687,404	717,935	734,585	769,686
Derby unitary authority	14,695	48,506	118,469	132,188	142,824	154,316	167,321	181,423	199,578	219,558	214,424	225,296	221,716	248,752
Total as a ceremonial county	147,481	271,920	584,365	674,885	708,650	744,786	780,622	819,068	850,862	885,571	901,828	943,231	956,301	1,018,438

== In literature and popular culture ==
The 1969 film Women in Love by Ken Russell had scenes filmed in and around Elvaston Castle, notably the Greco-Roman wrestling scene, which was filmed in the castle's Great Hall.

The 1988 film The Lair of the White Worm by Ken Russell, (starring Amanda Donohoe and Hugh Grant) was filmed largely in Derbyshire. Lair's opening title sequence and primary story locations occur in and around Thor's Cave, part of the Peak District, River Manifold valley.

The 2008 film The Duchess includes scenes filmed at Chatsworth House and at Kedleston Hall.

The 1993–2002 TV series Peak Practice was set in Crich and Fritchley, except for the twelfth and final series, and originally starred Kevin Whately and Amanda Burton. In 2003, an unrelated and less successful medical TV drama, Sweet Medicine, was mostly filmed in the historic market town of Wirksworth.

Other Derbyshire locations in which British TV scenes have been filmed include:

- Alderwasley: Stig of the Dump
- Ashbourne and Vernon Street in Derby: Nanny
- Chesterfield: The twisted spire of Church of St Mary and All Saints, Chesterfield, was made famous by its use in the opening credits of the 1966–1971 ecclesiastical BBC TV sitcom All Gas and Gaiters, featuring Derek Nimmo.
- Hadfield: The League of Gentlemen
- The Peak District is the scene of a series of four crime novels of the 21st century by Sarah Ward: Bitter Chill (2015), The Shrouded Path (2020), A Deadly Thaw and A Patient Fury.
- Repton and especially Repton School: Goodbye, Mr. Chips (in both 1939 and 1983 versions)
- Shirebrook: The Full Monty
- Wingfield Manor: 1980s BBC TV series of The Chronicles of Narnia

== See also ==
- Custos Rotulorum of Derbyshire – Keepers of the Rolls
- Derbyshire (UK Parliament constituency)
- Derbyshire Police and Crime Commissioner
- List of English and Welsh endowed schools (19th century)#Derbyshire
