= South and West Yorkshire Green Belt =

Environmental protection in England

Map of the South and West Yorkshire green belt showing extents, districts, counties, and other nearby green belts. South & West Yorkshire green belt County borders District borders York green belt North West green belt Stoke-on-Trent green belt Nottingham and Derby green belt

The South and West Yorkshire Green Belt is an environmental and planning policy that regulates the rural space within the Yorkshire and the Humber region of England. The function of the green belt policy in South and West Yorkshire is to manage development around the cities, towns and villages in the West Yorkshire Urban Area, the Sheffield urban area, Barnsley and Doncaster, to discourage urban sprawl. It is managed by local planning authorities following guidance from central government.

== Geography ==
Land area total of the green belt is 248,241 hectares (2,482.41 km^{2}; 958.46 sq mi) (1.9% of the total land area of England (2010). Its coverage is within the South and West Yorkshire counties, with extensions towards Harrogate and Knaresborough in North Yorkshire and Chesterfield in Derbyshire.

The South and West Yorkshire Green Belt is contiguous with the North West Green Belt along the Greater Manchester and West Yorkshire county boundary, creating a continuous band of protected area through to the English western coastline by the River Mersey and Irish Sea. The City of York Green Belt is to the north east.

== See also ==
- Green belt (United Kingdom)
