= West Midlands Green Belt =

British urban planning policy to maintain countryside around West Midlands urban areas

Map of the West Midlands Green Belt showing extents, districts and counties. Green belt District borders County borders

The West Midlands Green Belt is a statutory green belt environmental and planning policy that regulates the rural space within the West Midlands region of England. It is contained within the counties of the West Midlands, Shropshire, Staffordshire, Warwickshire and Worcestershire. Essentially, the function of the green belt is to rigorously manage development around the cities, towns and villages in the large West Midlands conurbations centred around Birmingham and Coventry, discouraging convergence. It is managed by local planning authorities on guidance from central government.

== Geography ==
Land area taken up by the green belt is 231,291 hectares (571,530 acres), 1.7% of the total land area of England (2019). Tracts of green belt lie within the West Midlands county itself, much of it by the Meriden Gap in Solihull borough; however, the vast coverage of the green belt completely envelops the county.

The green belt stretches from Stafford and Telford through to Stratford-upon-Avon, Warwick, and Rugby. There is a small isolated portion of green belt separating Droitwich Spa and Worcester. The Stoke-on-Trent and Burton upon Trent/Swadlincote green belts lie around 10 miles (16 km) to the north.

Due to the West Midlands green belt extending across several counties, responsibility and co-ordination lies with the many local district councils whose land covers the green belt, as these are the local planning government bodies.

Green belt locations
County	District council	Key inset areas	Outlying places
Shropshire	Shropshire	Albrighton, Shifnal	Telford, Bridgnorth
Staffordshire	Cannock Chase	Cannock, Norton Canes	Rugeley
Staffordshire	Lichfield	Burntwood, Shenstone	Lichfield
Staffordshire	South Staffordshire	Codsall, Great Wyrley, Wombourne	Penkridge
Staffordshire	Stafford	Cannock Chase AONB	Stafford
Staffordshire	Tamworth		Tamworth
Warwickshire	North Warwickshire	Coleshill	Atherstone
Warwickshire	Nuneaton and Bedworth	Bedworth, Bulkington	Nuneaton
Warwickshire	Rugby	Binley Woods, Long Lawford, Wolston	Rugby
Warwickshire	Stratford-on-Avon	Alcester, Henley-in-Arden, Studley	Stratford-upon-Avon
Warwickshire	Warwick	Kenilworth	Warwick, Royal Leamington Spa
West Midlands	Birmingham	Sutton Coldfield	
West Midlands	Coventry	Brownshill Green	
West Midlands	Dudley		
West Midlands	Sandwell		
West Midlands	Solihull	Balsall Common, Bentley Heath, Cheswick Green, Dickins Heath, Hampton-in-Arden, Meriden	
West Midlands	Walsall		
West Midlands	Wolverhampton		
Worcestershire	Bromsgrove	Alvechurch, Barnt Green, Bromsgrove, Hollywood	
Worcestershire	Redditch	Feckenham	
Worcestershire	Worcester	Claines	Worcester
Worcestershire	Wychavon	Hartlebury, Martin Hussingtree, Wychbold	Droitwich Spa
Worcestershire	Wyre Forest	Kidderminster	Bewdley
