= Cambridge Green Belt =

Area protected from development in Cambridgeshire, England

Cambridge green belt showing extents, counties, and districts Green belt County border District borders

The Cambridge Green Belt is a non-statutory green belt environmental and planning policy that regulates the rural space in the East of England region. It is centred on the city of Cambridge, along with surrounding areas. Essentially, the function of the belt is to control development in and around the Cambridge built up area, to prevent coalescence of nearby villages and preserve the historical character of the city. It is managed by local planning authorities on guidance from central government.

== Geography ==
Land area taken up by the green belt is 26,340 hectares (263.4 km^{2}; 101.7 sq mi), 0.2% of the total land area of England (2010). It is confined to 3 districts, all in Cambridgeshire - the smallest tracts are within the city on its fringes, and East Cambridgeshire, with South Cambridgeshire maintaining the vast portion of area. Due to the green belt lying wholly within the county border, responsibility and co-ordination lies with the above three councils as these are the local planning authorities.

Key suburbs, surrounding villages and towns within the realms of the green belt include Bottisham, Fen Ditton, Fulbourn, Girton, Great Shelford, Histon, Impington, and Sawston. Nearby landscape features and facilities within the green belt include Anglesey Abbey, Wandlebury Country Park, Magog Down, Cambridge Airport, Cantelupe Solar Farm, Cambridge Lakes and Girton golf clubs, Mullard Observatory, Fulbourn Fen Nature Reserve, and Trumpington Meadows Country Park.

== See also ==
- Green belt (United Kingdom)
