= Jonathan Manns =

British New Zealand town planner and surveyor

Jonathan Manns MBE JP
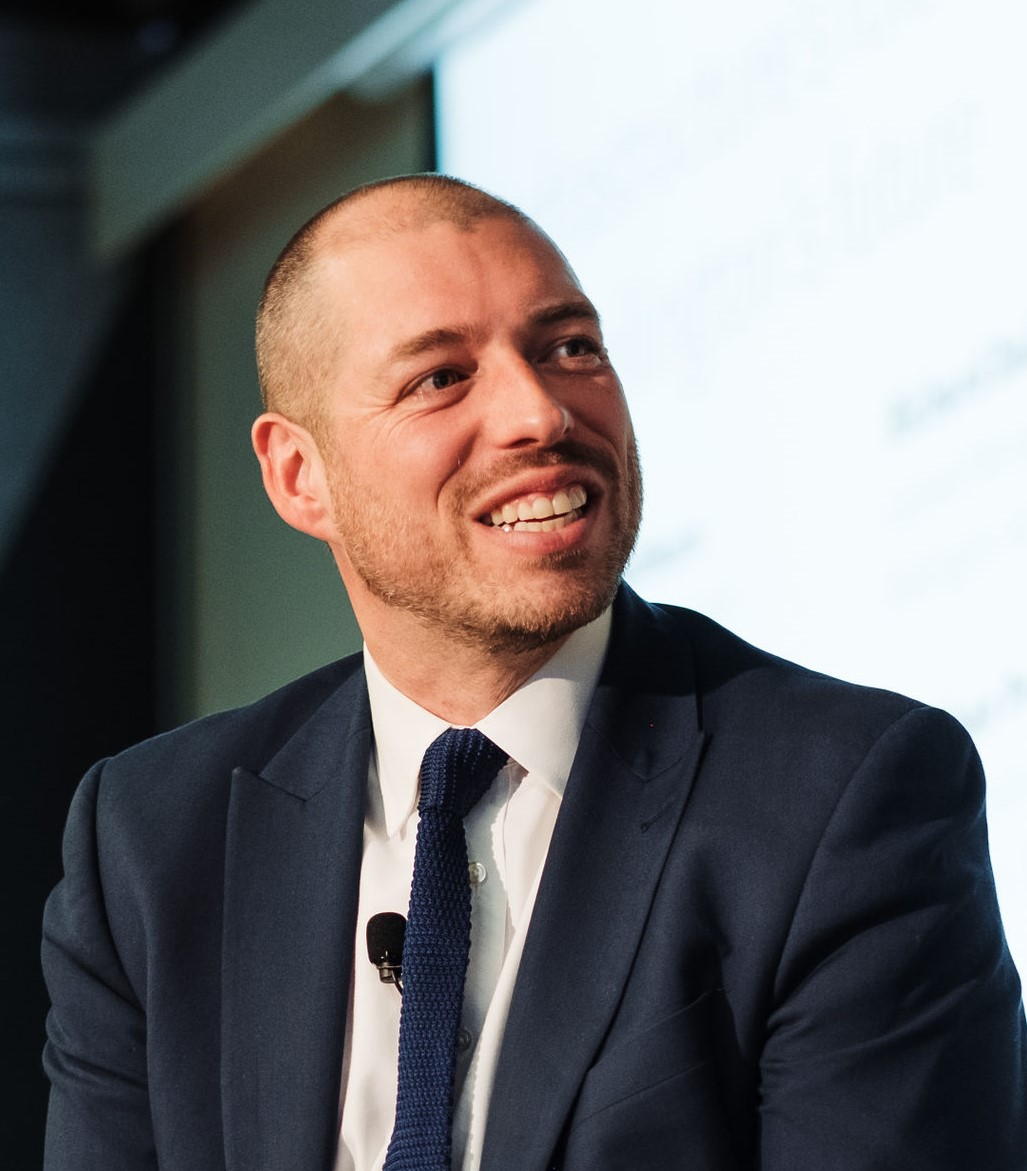
- Auckland, 2024

Personal details
- Born: Shirley, West Midlands, England
- Education: University of Sheffield, University of Cambridge
- Occupation: Urban Planner, Surveyor

Jonathan Manns is a British-born urbanist and property professional. His work has focused housing, urban growth, regeneration and land use policy in the United Kingdom and New Zealand.

== Early life and education ==
Manns grew up in Shirley, Solihull, where he attended Woodlands Infant, St James CE and Shirley Heath schools before securing an assisted scholarship to nearby Solihull School in 1996. He then read history at the University of Sheffield from 2003 to 2006 and after a period living in Nanjing, China, studied Planning, Growth and Regeneration at Girton College, Cambridge from 2007 to 2008.

== Career and Policy Work ==
Manns' professional background is in urban planning and real estate development, having qualified as both a town planner and surveyor. He has been involved with many of London's tall buildings and contributed extensively to discussions around the management of land for housing; both in the United Kingdom and New Zealand. His work has attracted international interest and he has proposed reforms to several key policy areas.

=== United Kingdom ===
Manns has been variously described by politicians and professional publications as "the pre-eminent British planner of his generation", "[one] of Britain's foremost urbanists" and "someone who has made a lasting and positive impact on communities and the built environment".

==== Housing Affordability ====
Manns has written extensively on the UK housing crisis. In 2017 he established the "House Me Now" campaign which crowd-funded the distribution of 2000 pass-it-on pamphlets around London to raise awareness of solutions amongst ordinary Londoners of possible solutions and to begin a social media debate. In 2018, on behalf of the campaign, he signed an open letter, submitted by Siobhan McDonagh MP, to the UK Government, calling for the release of land close to transport nodes for development.

==== Green Belt ====
Manns' work on Green Belts is cited widely. In 2014 he authored a history of the emergence of London's green belt, which said that it should not be treated as sacrosanct and set out the historical precedent for reform. He has subsequently supported work by the London School of Economics and in 2016 put forward the concept of a "Green Web" whereby new development would be accompanied by environmental enhancements and contribute to a net gain in biodiversity.

Manns' commentary on Green Belts has at times attracted criticism from environmental campaigners and journalistic commentators. These have, in particular, hinged on the role of development interests in planning debates and the potential for conflicts of interest. It has been suggested both that property professionals make unconvincing champions for reform and that his varied public profile constitutes a potential form of lobbying (a criticism which has itself attracted attention).

Manns has always stated his view that "public policy should be adaptable and that the emphasis should be firmly on securing the best outcomes. It should be possible to consider both whether the overall effects are beneficial and whether there is scope for improvement. If opportunities exist to deliver development more sustainably, the ability to explore and realise this should not be prevented by dogmatic defence of the status quo. England's green belt should not be off the table for appraisal and, if appropriate, amendment."

==== Suburbs ====
In January 2020, Jake Berry MP, as Minister of State for the Northern Powerhouse and Local Growth, concluded a parliamentary debate on local services with an invitation for Rupa Huq MP to "be a bit naughty" and establish a cross-party "Suburban Taskforce". The Taskforce launched in March 2020, co-chaired by Huq and David Simmonds MP. The stated purpose was "to shine a light on the suburbs in order to identify and secure the clear, long-term and properly resourced policies needed to support thriving, sustainable and inclusive suburban areas". The advisory board was announced in August 2020, with Manns named as its chair. He claimed at the outset that its importance was that "city centres and the countryside have their advocates, but suburbs – where most of us live – haven’t received the attention they deserve" and on publication that the work had changed "the way we think about the types of suburbs which exist and the specific challenges they face". The final Inquiry into the Future of the Suburbs, which identified a range of policy considerations and nine specific recommendations, was published in September 2022.

==== West London Orbital ====
Manns co-authored an analysis of growth options for the UK Government's All Party Parliamentary Group for London's Planning and Built Environment, in which he proposed new orbital rail links in West London, connecting existing communities and those which could accommodate additional growth. It encouraged West London Alliance to reconsider work it had commissioned in 2001 which flagged the scope to connect Old Oak Common and Brent Cross along the Dudding Hill line. This was agreed at the following meeting of the West London Economic Prosperity Board, in December 2016, and the Board voted to engage the Mayor of London around a West London Orbital in June 2017, which Sadiq Khan committed himself to delivering in March 2018.

=== New Zealand ===
Manns moved with his family to New Zealand in 2021 as his partner wanted to be closer to her mother. The family settled in Seatoun, a suburb of Wellington. On moving to New Zealand he became involved with notable housing, urban policy and infrastructure initiatives. Within two years he had been recognised as somebody who had "genuinely moved the needle" in the country.

==== Underground Infrastructure ====
He served as external advisor to Wellington City Council in their development of an Underground Asset Register, which became the first of its kind in New Zealand when launched in 2024. The project, supported by the Harvard Bloomberg City Leadership Initiative, attracted controversy in the months prior to launch when senior council leaders missed key decision-making meetings to join Manns and others in New York.

===== Housing =====
Having spent a large part of his career advocating and campaigning with regard to housing security, affordability and homelessness, he took the role of Chief Executive for Wellington's largest residential landlord and affordable housing provider, Te Toi Mahana, in 2025; leading it to become "an example of how a professionally led, culturally responsive and financially sustainable community housing provider can operate at scale". During his tenure, Te Toi Mahana became the first residential landlord in Australia and New Zealand to achieve RICS-regulated status, an achievement the RICS described as setting a new regional benchmark for professionalism and accountability in the housing sector.

=== Global ===
==== Land Measurement ====
He was commissioned by the Royal Institution of Chartered Surveyors to prepare the first international guidance on the measurement of land and calculation of associated metrics such as density. On publication these definitions established, for the first time, a global standard for all land measurements around the world. A draft was released for consultation in 2019. The Guidance was published in 2021.

== Advocacy and affiliations ==
In 2016 he was invited to co-launch the Open City "Green Sky Thinking" week. He teaches at UCL and is on the editorial board for the Journal of Urban Regeneration and Renewal. He is a Fellow of the Royal Society of Arts (FRSA), the Royal Geographical Society (FRGS), the Royal Town Planning Institute (FRTPI) and the Royal Institution of Chartered Surveyors (FRICS). At the time of his appointment he was believed to have been the youngest person to have been awarded Fellowship of the RTPI, and also of both the RTPI and RICS.

=== Political advocacy ===
In 2015, Manns was Convenor of the UK Government's All Party Parliamentary Group for London's Planning and Built Environment. The purpose of the APPG was defined as being "to explore the social, economic and environmental issues affecting London at a strategic level and build consensus as to the ways in which these might be addressed." The group, chaired by Rupa Huq MP, subsequently discussed matters from the Green Belt to the Grenfell Fire.

=== Public advocacy ===
Manns is a Patron of the Thrive Foundation, which exists as a non-partisan charitable trust to support marginalized young people as active participants and future leaders in New Zealand's civil society. He is a former member of the advisory board for the Patchwork Foundation, which seeks to engage those from non-traditional backgrounds in UK politics and civil society. He is a past trustee of the London Society, which was founded in 1912 to promote debate around London's built environment with members of the public. He also assisted with the Long Live Southbank campaign to protect and extend London's historic skate spot.

=== Justice of the Peace ===
Manns is a Justice of the Peace for New Zealand and was gazetted in 2024.

== Honours ==
Manns was appointed an Ordinary Member of the Most Excellent Order of the British Empire (MBE) in the Queen's Birthday Honours 2022 "for services to Planning, Real Estate and to Built Environments".
