= Planning committee =

A planning committee in the United Kingdom is a committee of local authority (council) councillors and planning officials that sit as the local planning authority to determine planning applications.

Advice is usually given to the committee by planning officers who provide a recommendation for approval or refusal. Meetings are cyclical and are usually held between every three to six weeks and must be open to the public.

The entry on development control in the United Kingdom includes a detailed explanation about the role and workings of a planning committee, the planning officers who report to them, and including the role and significance of public comments and objections to any given planning application.

== See also ==
- Board of zoning appeals
- Delegated powers (UK town planning)
- Town and country planning in the United Kingdom
- Sustainable Development, Spatial and Regional Planning Committee (National Assembly of France)
- Zoning board
