= North West Green Belt =

Area restricting urban growth in England

Map of the North West green belt (2016), showing extents, districts containing portions of belt, and counties. North West green belt South and West Yorkshire green belt Stoke-on-Trent green belt Ceremonial county borders District council borders

The North West Green Belt is a green belt environmental and planning policy that regulates the rural space throughout mainly the North West region of England. It is contained within the counties of Cheshire, Derbyshire, Greater Manchester, Lancashire, and Merseyside. Essentially, the function of the belt is to prevent the cities, towns and villages in the large Greater Manchester and Merseyside conurbations from merging. It is managed by local planning authorities on guidance from central government.

== Geography ==
Land area taken up by the belt is 247,650 hectares, 1.9% of the total land area of England (2010). The main coverage of the belt is within northern Cheshire and southern Lancashire, with the Merseyside and Greater Manchester urban areas completely surrounded, and a small section extending into Derbyshire.

The belt area surrounding Macclesfield is close to the Stoke-on-Trent belt, which is considered to be independent of the North West belt. The North West belt is contiguous with the South and West Yorkshire Green Belt along the Greater Manchester and West Yorkshire county boundary. The High Peak towns of Derbyshire, Glossop, New Mills, Hadfield, Charlesworth and Whaley Bridge are all enveloped.

Small portions of separated green belt are dotted around the Blackpool urban area, helping to keep the settlements of Lytham St Annes, Poulton-le-Fylde, Warton/Freckleton and Kirkham separated. A distant tract of belt also separates Lancaster and Morecambe from Carnforth, Bolton le Sands, Nether Kellet and Hest Bank. Due to the belt lying across several counties, responsibility and co-ordination lies with several district councils and unitary authorities as these are the local planning authorities.

== See also ==
- Green belt (United Kingdom)
