= South West Hampshire/South East Dorset Green Belt =

Area protected from development in South West England

South West Hampshire & South East Dorset green belt showing extents, counties, and districts. Green belt County borders District borders

The South West Hampshire & South East Dorset Green Belt is a green belt environmental and planning policy that regulates the rural space in the South West region of England. It is mainly within the county of Dorset, extending cross border into Hampshire. Essentially, the function of the belt is to control development expansion in the South East Dorset conurbation and outlying towns and villages. It is managed by local planning authorities on guidance from central government.

== Geography ==
First created in 1958 (Hampshire) and 1980 (Dorset), the belt takes up 36,000 hectares (360 km^{2}; 140 sq mi), 0.3% of the total land area of England (2017). Much of this is within the Dorset unitary authority area, with smaller portions within Bournemouth, Christchurch and Poole.

The New Forest district in Hampshire holds several portions of green belt, and the boundary of those are mainly contiguous with the New Forest National Park. Due to the belt lying across county borders, responsibility and co-ordination lies with the aforementioned local unitary and district councils as these are the local planning authorities.

== See also ==
- Green belt (United Kingdom)
