= Eric Sorensen (civil servant) =

Eric Kenneth Sorensen is an English former civil servant. He was chief executive of the London Docklands Development Corporation (LDDC) from 1991 until 1997, where he was responsible for regenerating London’s Docklands and delivering the Canary Wharf financial district.

== Career ==
=== Early career ===
Sorensen began his career as a civil servant, working as an under-secretary at the Department for Environment before heading its Inner Cities Directorate.

=== London Docklands Development Corporation ===
He was appointed chief executive of the LDDC in February 1991, succeeding Reg Ward and Michael Honey. His brief was to fund infrastructure investments and finalise land sales whilst rebuilding damaged relationships with local communities and winding up the development corporation. A friend of Peter Hall, who is often credited with formulating the Urban Enterprise Zone concept, Sorensen described the Docklands redevelopment as “the showcase for Thatcherism”.

=== Later career ===
Sorensen left the LDDC in March 1997 and was later chief executive of the Millennium Commission, distributing lottery grants. He was then chief executive of the Thames Gateway Partnership and London Development Partnership, the latter of which advised the first elected Mayor of London (Ken Livingstone) in 2000 on strategic priorities for London in preparation for a new London Development Agency (a Regional Development Agency for London).

== Retirement ==
Sorensen supports a range of charitable causes. He is a non-executive director of Homerton Hospital, a governor at the Museum of London, a member of Islington Council's Standards Committee, and chair of the Royal Docks Charitable Trust, which supports community groups in the locality. He is also a trustee of the London Society.
