= Delegated powers (UK town planning) =

Delegated powers are given in the United Kingdom to local planning authority planning officers to determine planning applications without the requirement for the application to be put before a planning committee. Planning applications for minor development, development which has no significant impact on the public interest, or those planning applications which do not attract public objections are generally decided by an authorised senior officer of the local planning authority under such delegated powers. Each LPA will have its own scheme of delegation and standing orders which prescribe the categories of planning application which may be determined under delegated powers. In any case of doubt an approach should be made to the LPA concerned.

The entry on Development control in the United Kingdom provides an explanation of how planning applications are decided, including an explanation of the role of public involvement.

== See also ==
- Town and country planning in the United Kingdom
