= Green belt =

Largely undeveloped, wild, or agricultural land surrounding urban areas

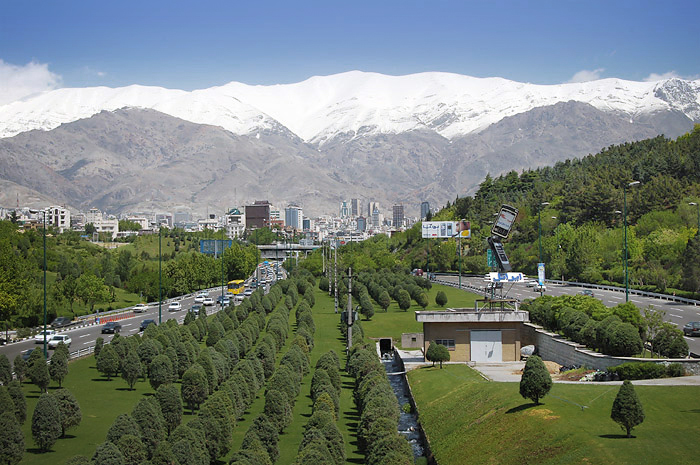
Green belt in Tehran, Iran

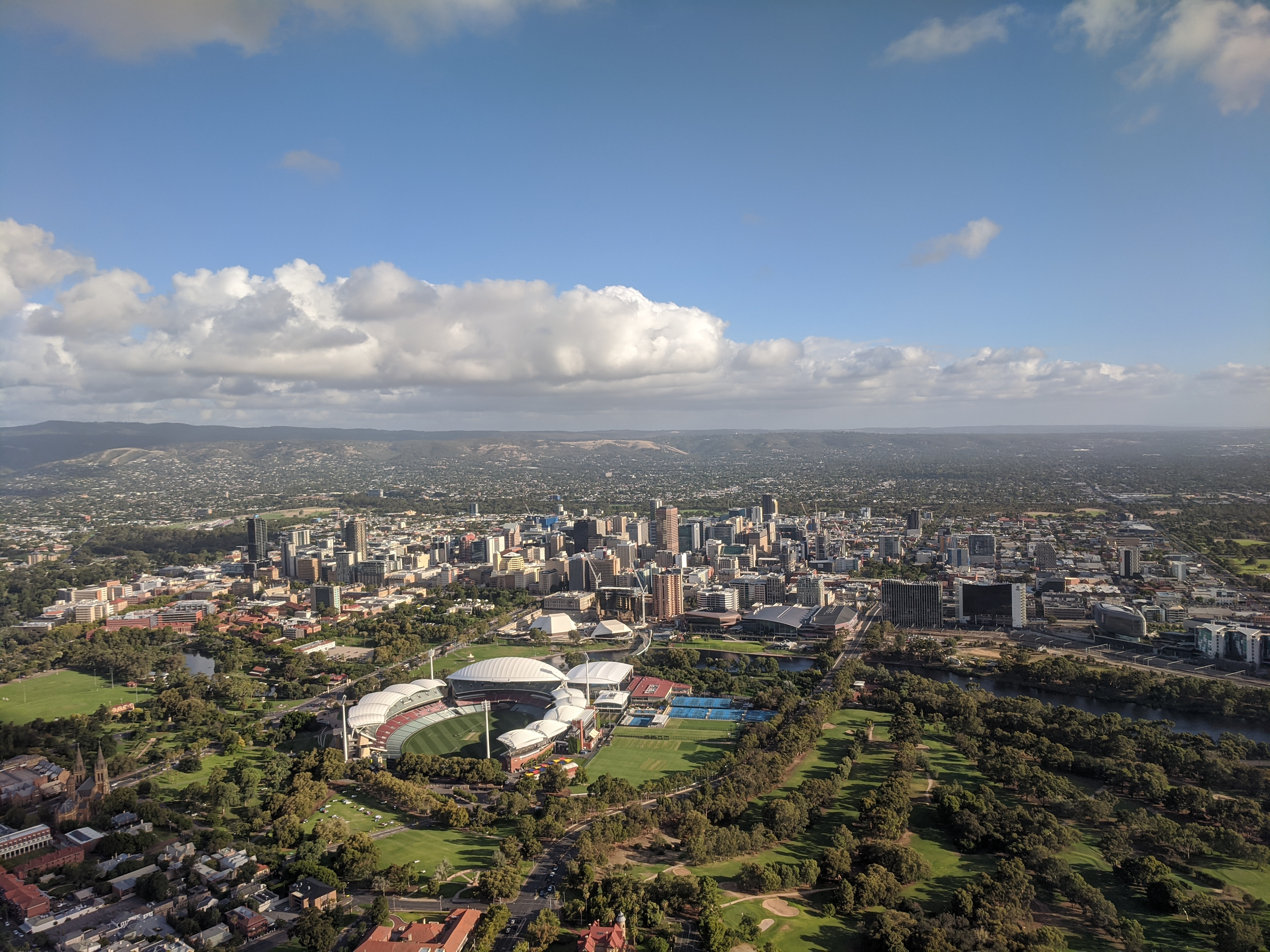
Adelaide Park Lands green belt around the city centre

A green belt or greenbelt is a policy, and land-use zone designation used in land-use planning to retain areas of largely undeveloped, wild, or agricultural land surrounding or neighboring urban areas. Similar concepts are greenways or green wedges, which have a linear character and may run through an urban area instead of around it. In essence, a green belt is an invisible line designating a border around a certain area, preventing development of the area and allowing wildlife to return and be established.

The more general term in the United States is green space or greenspace, which may be a very small area such as a park.

== Purposes ==
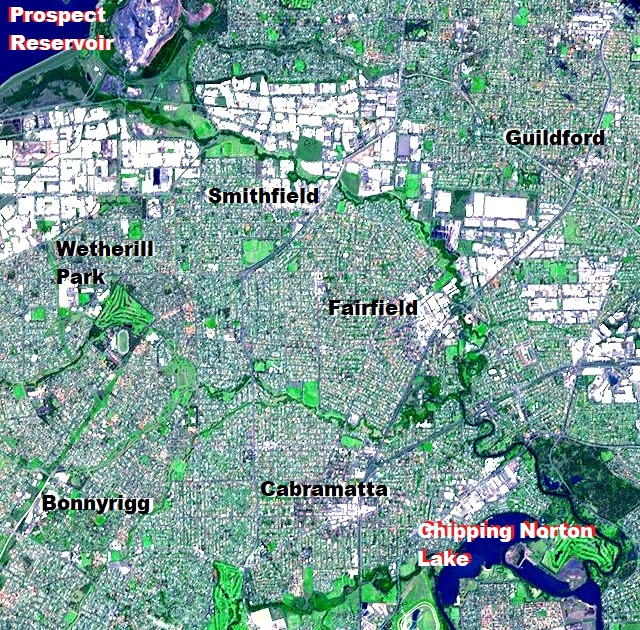
Four green belts in Western Sydney, Australia; three of them are riparian strips along creeks, serving as natural corridors for recreation and ecological conservation in the region.

In those countries which have them, the stated objectives of green belt policy are to:

- Protect natural or semi-natural environments;
- Improve air quality within urban areas;
- Ensure that urban dwellers have access to the countryside, with consequent educational and recreational opportunities;
- Protect the unique character of rural communities that might otherwise be absorbed by expanding suburbs.

The green belt has many benefits for people:

- Walking, camping, and biking areas close to cities, towns, or neighborhoods.
- Contiguous habitat network for wild plants, animals and wildlife.
- Cleaner air and water
- Better land use of areas within the bordering cities.

The effectiveness of green belts differs depending on location and country. They can often be eroded by urban rural fringe uses and sometimes, development 'jumps' over the green belt area, resulting in the creation of "satellite towns" which, although separated from the city by the green belt, function more like suburbs than independent communities.

== History ==
In the 7th century, Muhammad established a green belt around Medina. He did this by prohibiting any further removal of trees in a 12-mile-long strip around the city. In 1580 Elizabeth I of England banned new buildings in a 3-mile wide belt around the City of London in an attempt to stop the spread of plague. However, this was not widely enforced and it was possible to buy dispensations which reduced the effectiveness of the proclamation.

In modern times, the term emerged from continental Europe where broad boulevards were increasingly used to separate new development from the centers of historic towns; most notably the Ringstraße in Vienna. Green belt policy was then pioneered in the United Kingdom confronted with ongoing rural flight. The term itself was first used in relation to the growth of London by Octavia Hill in 1875. Various proposals were put forward from 1890 onwards but the first to garner widespread support was put forward by the London Society in its "Development Plan of Greater London" 1919. Alongside the CPRE they lobbied for a continuous belt (of up to two miles wide) to prevent urban sprawl, beyond which new development could occur.

The green belt around the city of York, in England

There are fourteen green belt areas in the UK covering 16,716 km^{2} or 12.4% of England, and 164 km^{2} of Scotland; for a detailed discussion of these, see Green belt (UK). Other notable examples are the Ottawa Greenbelt and Golden Horseshoe Greenbelt in Ontario, Canada. Ottawa's 20,350-hectare (78.6 mi^{2}) instance is managed by the National Capital Commission (NCC).

The dynamic Adelaide Park Lands, measuring approximately 7.6 km^{2}, surround, unbroken, the city center of Adelaide. On the fringe of the eastern suburbs, an expansive natural green belt in the Adelaide Hills acts as a growth boundary for Adelaide and cools the city in the hottest months.

The concept of "green belt" has evolved in recent years to encompass not only "Greenspace" but also "Greenstructure" which comprises all urban and peri-urban green spaces, an important aspect of sustainable development in the 21st century. The European Commission's COST Action C11 (COST – European Cooperation in Science and Technology) is undertaking "Case studies in Greenstructure Planning" involving 15 European countries.

An act of the Swedish parliament from 1994 has declared a series of parks in Stockholm and the adjacent municipality of Solna to its north a "national city park" called Royal National City Park.

The city of Taranto, Italy adopted a Green Belt plan in 2025.

== Criticism ==
=== House prices ===
When established around an economically prosperous city, homes in a green belt may have been motivated by or result in considerable premiums. They may also be more economically resilient as popular among the retired and less attractive for short-term renting of modest homes. Where in the city itself demand exceeds supply in housing, green belt homes compete directly with much city housing wherever such green belt homes are well-connected to the city. Further, they in all cases attract a future-guaranteed premium for protection of their views, recreational space and for the preservation/conservation value itself. Most also benefit from higher rates of urban gardening and farming, particularly when done in a community setting, which has positive effects on nutrition, fitness, self-esteem, and happiness, providing a benefit for both physical and mental health, in all cases easily provided or accessed in a green belt. Government planners also seek to protect the green belt as its local farmers are engaged in peri-urban agriculture which augments carbon sequestration, reduces the urban heat island effect, and provides a habitat for organisms. Peri-urban agriculture may also help recycle urban greywater and other products of wastewater, helping to conserve water and reduce waste.

The housing market contrasts with more uncertainty and economic liberalism inside and immediately outside of the belt: green belt homes have by definition nearby protected landscapes.

Critics include Mark Pennington and the economics-heavy think tanks such as the Institute of Economic Affairs who would see a reduction in many green belts. Such studies focus on the widely inherent limitations of green belts. In most examples, only a small fraction of the population uses the green belt for leisure purposes. The IEA study claims that a green belt is not strongly causally linked to clean air and water. Rather, they view the ultimate result of the decision to green-belt a city as one to prevent housing demand within the zone to be met with supply, thus exacerbating high housing prices and stifling competitive forces in general.

=== Increasing urban sprawl ===
Another area of criticism comes from the fact that, since a green belt does not extend indefinitely outside a city, it spurs the growth of areas much further away from the city core than if it had not existed, thereby actually increasing urban sprawl. Examples commonly cited are the Ottawa suburbs of Kanata and Orleans, both of which are outside the city's green belt and are currently undergoing explosive growth. This leads to other problems, as residents of these areas have a longer commute to workplaces in the city and worse access to public transport. It also means people have to commute through the green belt, an area not designed to cope with high levels of transportation. Not only is the merit of a green belt subverted, but the green belt may heighten the problem and make the city unsustainable.

There are many examples whereby the actual effect of green belts is to act as a land reserve for future freeways and other highways. Examples include sections of Ontario Highway 407 north of Toronto and the Hunt Club Road and Richmond Road south of Ottawa. Whether they are originally planned as such, or the result of a newer administration taking advantage of land that was left available by its predecessors is debatable.

=== United Kingdom ===
Green belts were established in England in 1955 to simply prevent the physical growth of large built-up areas; to prevent neighboring cities and towns from merging. In the UK, green belt around the major conurbations has been criticized as one of the main protectionist bars to building housing, the others being other planning restrictions (Local Plans and restrictive covenants) and developers' land banking. Local Plans and land banking are to be relaxed for home building in the 2015–2030 period by law and the green belt will be reduced by some local authorities as each local authority must now consider it among the available shortlisted options in drawing development plans to meet higher housing targets. Critics argue that the green belts defeat their stated objective of saving the countryside and open spaces. Such criticism falls short when considering the other, broader benefits such as peri-urban agriculture which includes gardening and carries many benefits, especially to the retired. It also ignores the strategic aims of the Attlee Ministry in 1946, just as in France, of shifting capital away from the capital city (addressing regional disparity) and avoiding intra-urban gridlock.

The restrictions of the Green Belt were particularly in the 1940s–1980s mitigated with planned, government-supported, new towns under the New Towns Act 1946 and New Towns Act 1981. These saw establishment beyond the green belts of new homes, infrastructure, businesses, and other facilities. Without large-scale sustainable development, infill development sees urban green space lost. A chronic housing shortage with inadequate new settlements and/or extension of those outside of the green belt and/or no green belt reduction has seen many brownfield sites, often well-suited to industry and commerce, lost in existing conurbations.

== See also ==
- Buffer zone / Community separator
- Conservation movement
- Development-supported agriculture
- Ecology
- Greenway (landscape)
- Land use planning
- Montgomery County Agricultural Reserve
- Peri-urban agriculture
- Prime farmland
- Retirement community
- Sustainability
- Urban growth boundary
- Urban rural fringe
- Urban sprawl
