= London Society (organisation) =

British membership organisation based in London

The London Society
- Founded: 1912
- Type: Charitable organization
- Registration no.: England and Wales: 206270
- Purpose: Urban planning
- Location: London, N1
- Origins: Founded in 1912
- Region served: London
- Chair: Leanne Tritton
- Website: www.londonsociety.org.uk

The London Society is a British membership organisation established to encourage public interest and participation in urban planning and transport matters in London as well as to study and celebrate the capital's unique history and character. It is among the oldest civic societies in the United Kingdom.

== Purpose ==
The society advertises itself as being "for all those who love London". Its original motto was "Antiqua Tegenda, Pulchra Petenda, Futura Colenda”, Latin for "look after the old, seek the beautiful, cultivate the future". It was agreed at the society's annual general meeting in 2018 that a new motto would be adopted: "Valuing the past; looking to the future", which came into effect in 2019. The society's journal states that "the aim of the society is to stimulate a wider concern for the beauty of the capital city, for the preservation of its charms and the careful consideration of its developments".

== History ==
The London Society was founded on the back of the town planning movement in the early 20th century. In the year following the first planning act, the Housing, Town Planning, &c. Act 1909, the Royal Institute of British Architects (RIBA) held a London conference which focused attention on the capital city, and the Architectural Review began a town planning supplement. In its first issue the architect David Barclay Niven wrote a paper on the need for new roads and a system of parks in outer London before the area was swamped by new development; his ideas chimed with those of George Pepler who gave a paper at the RIBA conference suggesting that a voluntary body might undertake inquiries into London's needs and lead public opinion. The London Society became this body.

The society was formally inaugurated on 9 February 1912 at a meeting at the galleries of the Royal Society of British Artists. The minutes of the first meeting indicate that it was attended by only ‘a few men keenly interested in the artistic development of London and the protection of its beauty and character’. Two weeks later, the society adopted its name and settled its objects as being ‘to foster an intelligent interest in London as the largest civic centre’ and ‘to induce a public spirit for the study and encouragement of its improvement’. The Earl of Plymouth accepted the position of president of the London Society. Niven took the chair at the first meeting in 1912, though he was soon succeeded by the weightier figure of Aston Webb. By the third meeting on 9 February 1912, 160 people were present. Those who had been promoting the need to prepare a plan for London at the Town Planning Conference were quick to join. This included politician John Burns, planner Sir George Pepler, and architects William Edward Riley and Arthur Beresford Pite.

The society was launched to the general public on 13 January 1913 at a meeting held at the Mansion House, under the presidency of the Lord Mayor, Earl Curzon of Kedleston (later the 1st Marquess Curzon of Kedleston) who delivered an address that neatly described its objects as being "to make London beautiful where it is not so already, and to keep it beautiful where it already is". The fledgling society attracted wide coverage and interest. By the end of 1913 the society's membership was over 400, including 65 MPs and peers, 9 members of the London County Council and many practising architects and surveyors. Early members also included planners, engineers and artists. Its formation partly reflected a shift from a 19th-century philanthropic approach to urban reform to a more professional and democratic attempt to planning of the whole urban environment. It predated the establishment of the Royal Town Planning Institute in 1914. The journalist Thomas Raffles Davison wrote:

"The chief issue is the good of London, its orderly and beautiful development, its general amenity as a place for business or pleasure", and that the society’s role was "to think about the Future of London and its improvement" as well as "the jealous preservation of all that is old and beautiful in London as far as is possible."

Sir Bruce Ingram, Lord Northcliffe and George Riddell, 1st Baron Riddell brought press fire-power. Bruce Ingram was managing director of The Illustrated London News and The Sketch, Lord Northcliffe who was vice president of the society by 1919 owned The Evening News (a London newspaper), The Times and the Daily Mail, whilst Sir George Riddell, who was on the society's council, was managing director of the News of the World. Viscount Hambledon was proprietor of WHSmith.

The society developed the first Development Plan of Greater London (1919) which influenced thinking about shaping places and the post-war planning put forward in Patrick Abercrombie’s Greater London Plan (1944). This was the first attempt to envisage the management of London as a functional metropolitan region and a key step in developing the notion of a green belt. The first major project to be taken up by the society, the Development Plan pulled together many of the ideas for roads and open spaces being canvassed in the years before the Great War. War delayed this work though preparation of the plan provided some employment for architects when new building more or less ended. The plan was completed in 1917 but government controls prevented its publication until the end of 1918. The Metropolitan Police had covered a wide area since its establishment in 1829 but otherwise the concept of a Greater London to be planned as a whole was forward-looking and not given administrative force until the establishment of the Greater London Council in 1965. When Patrick Abercrombie was asked to draft a plan for the LCC area in 1941 he commented that he would only do it if he could follow the lead of the London Society and do a plan for Greater London as well.

By the early 21st century the society's activities had begun to focus increasingly on heritage and conservation. For this reason, following its centenary in 2012, the society's executive committee proposed merging the organisation into the Heritage of London Trust (HOLT). This prompted an influential group of professionals to intervene and set out an alternative vision for the future, instead making the case for retaining and reinvigorating the charity with a renewed focus on its original objects. A vote was taken among members of the society at an extraordinary general meeting in December 2013. This prevented the merger and the society was formally relaunched in September 2014 by a new executive committee.

== Modern society ==
Membership of the London Society is open to all. The society is supported by a range of patrons and members, both organisational and individual.

- President: The current president is Prince Richard, Duke of Gloucester.
- Committee: Leanne Tritton (chair), Neil Bennett and Darryl Chen (both vice-chairman), Barry Coidan (treasurer), and Helen Parton (editor). Other committee members include Michael Coupe, Alpa Depani, Rob Fiehn, Dave Hill, Nick Mckeogh, Mark Prizeman, Lucy Smith and Eric Sorensen.

== Notable members ==
The founding members of the society were "an extraordinary assemblage of the Great and the Good". Its first chair was Aston Webb. Its vice-presidents included Lord Curzon, former Viceroy of India, John Elliot Burns, then president of the Local Government Board, Lord Northcliffe, owner of The Times, and retail tycoon Gordon Selfridge.

In March 1914 The Builder commented that "architects are the backbone of The London Society". Indeed, notable early members of the council and executive committee include Sir Edwin Lutyens, Raymond Unwin, Sir Aston Webb, Stanley Davenport Adshead, Arthur Beresford Pite, David Barclay Niven, Leonard Stokes and Reginald Blomfield. The architectural legacy of many of these early members is evident both within London and beyond: Lutyens was architect of The Cenotaph and New Delhi, Unwin designer of garden cities such as Welwyn and Letchworth and Hampstead Garden Suburb, Webb as architect of the front façade of Buckingham Palace and the V&A Museum, and Adshead as president of the Royal Institute of British Architects.

Those from beyond the architectural professions included illustrator Thomas Raffles Davison, artist and president of the Royal Academy, Frank Brangwyn (who studied under William Morris and worked alongside Diego Rivera and Josep Maria Sert to decorate the concourse of the RCA Building in New York), publisher J. M. Dent (producer of the Everyman's Library series) and politician Reginald Brabazon, 12th Earl of Meath. Painter and past director of the National Gallery, Sir Edward Poynter, joined in 1913. So too did Sir Thomas Brock, sculptor of the Queen Victoria memorial. Lady Feodora Gleichen, the first woman to be made a member of the Royal Society of Sculptors, joined in 1919.

At the time of the 2014 saving and relaunch, the executive committee comprised: Peter Barber, Peter Bishop, Patricia Brown, Michael Coupe, Benjamin Derbyshire, Kathryn Firth, Martin Hart, Edward Jones, Jonathan Manns, Nick McKeogh, David Michon, Peter Murray (chairman), Clive Price, Mark Prizeman, Eric Reynolds, Eric Sorensen and Deyan Sudjic.

== Journal ==
The Journal of The London Society was first produced in 1913, and, while the format has changed over time, it has been published ever since. It is now published twice a year and distributed free of charge to members. The current editor is Helen Parton. Past editors include former deputy editor of Time Out London Jessica Cargill Thompson and Booker-nominated Philippa Stockley.

== White papers ==
From its earliest days it has produced reports and contributed to debates about the future of London and various of its landmarks (e.g. London churches, Euston Arch, the British Museum, etc.). Indeed, a collection of essays published in 1921 was entitled London of the Future. In this context, the society has historically played a significant ‘thought leadership’ role. To continue this work the society in 2014 launched a series of occasional white papers by those at the forefront of debate about the city. These are considered on their merit. They are professionally rigorous, peer-reviewed and intended to direct discussion about the evolution of London. Those published to-date include:

Green Sprawl: Our current affection for a preservation myth? (2014)

The society's first white paper was authored by the English urban planner and surveyor Jonathan Manns. It provides a comprehensive history of the evolution of London's green belt from the 19th century until the 1960s and contextualizes this with a consideration of that which existed in the early 21st Century. Regarded as "an excellent historical account of the establishment of the Green Belt around London", the report attracted wide coverage and prompted an update of the House of Commons Standard Note on Green Belt (SN/SC/934) and subsequent Research Briefings. The most widely reported element within the public media was its emphasis on the need to "move away from the simplistic and naïve idea that that countryside is a sacrosanct patchwork of medieval hedgerows and towards an empirically informed position which once more recognises housing as a need to be met in locations with appropriate environmental capacity." Manns said:

"This means asking ourselves how best to meet the challenges faced today in an holistic and strategic manner. Would we devise the current green belt if we started again today and do we actually need the green belt in certain places? It emerged as an idea that flexibly evolved and adapted to respond to the perceived challenges facing each generation. We can and should have the confidence to build on these achievements and re-envisage it for those that follow."

Building Greater London: An end to the Capital's crisis of affordability (2015)

Written by Ben Derbyshire, English architect (managing partner of HTA Design), it considers London's housing shortage at the start of the 21st century and proposes solutions, including a strategic revamp of the structure of governance for the economic region of Greater London and consideration of the kinds of housing solutions that the leadership of such an entity could pursue. Looking to examples from elsewhere in the world, the implication of Derbyshire's work is that London has fallen behind; he told Building: "Melbourne has built example homes of different kinds all around its central business district, San Francisco has got a larger area with greater powers and is encouraging a more diverse offer". He said:

"The people most adversely affected by the affordability crisis are London’s young who are struggling to find places to live in the city, yet on the other hand they are the entrepreneurial seedbed of the city’s future."

Re/Shaping London: Unlocking Sustainable Growth in West London and Beyond (2016)

Jointly authored by Jonathan Manns and Nicholas Falk, this paper sets out recommendations as to how planning could be done better in England and gives consideration to the opportunities in West London. It was published by the London Society and commissioned by the All Party Parliamentary Group (APPG) for London's Planning and Built Environment. The most publicized idea was for a 'green web' to replace the 'green belt' in some locations, with the ambition being to create a "multifunctional green infrastructure landscape" in which new-build and publicly accessible natural space sat side by side. It also calls for a new Garden City at Northolt Airport and a new orbital railway linking Uxbridge and Staines via West Drayton and Heathrow. Huq, who chairs the APPG, said:

"It is only through innovative fresh-thinking such as this that we can begin to chart a course towards the type of cities in which we wish to live."

== Political influence ==
London's parliamentarians have a close historic involvement with the society. In the early years the political diversity and influence of the society was particularly notable, not least because the Government remained cautious of state intervention in built environment issues. Early Liberal members included Viscount Cowdray and Walter Morrison, whilst Conservatives included the Earl of Crawford and Sir George Touche; all were members of the Parliamentary Committee by 1919. More widely, founding member John Adams was committed to the Marxist Democratic Federation (later the Social Democratic Federation) whilst Lady St Davids was an influential campaigner for women's rights. By 1920 the Parliamentary Committee had 40 members, which included the majority of London MPs and peers.

This connection to Parliament was re-established with the launch of the All-party parliamentary group (APPG) on London's Planning and Built Environment in October 2015, for which the society provides the secretariat. When launched, the APPG was the first cross-party group to focus on London's planning and built environment for some 50 years. The first chair was Rupa Huq and vice-chair Paul Scully, with the Bishop of London being Lords liaison and Helen Hayes acting as treasurer.

== Library ==
The library is a research resource for matters relating to the history of London and contains over 3,500 items. It is held at Mortimer Wheeler House. Its contents include books, periodicals, maps, press cuttings, letters and drawings. Access is available to members on request.

== Activities ==
Society events include member visits to places of interest, keynote lectures (including the annual Banister Fletcher Lecture), debates and social events. These are intended to bring together those with a particular interest in the city, whatever their age or interests. Recent speakers have included Stephen Bayley, Rowan Moore and Robert Peston.

Banister Fletcher Lecture

Sir Banister Flight Fletcher (1866–1953) was an English architect and architectural historian. He was president of the Royal Institute of British Architects (RIBA) from 1929 to 1931. With his father he co-authored A History of Architecture on the Comparative Method (1896) which became the standard architectural textbook for much of the twentieth century. Banister Fletcher was an early member of the society and his will provided a small bequest to the society on condition that it held an annual lecture in his name, which was inaugurated upon his death. Speakers have included:

- 2005 Margaret Richardson, curator and historian
- 2006 Elizabeth Williamson, architectural editor
- 2007 Ptolemy Dean, architect and journalist
- 2008 Ian Dungavell, art historian
- 2009 Emily Cole, conservationist
- 2010 David Gilbert, geographer
- 2011 Will Palin, heritage campaigner
- 2012 Richard Chartres, Bishop of London
- 2013 Alec Forshaw, conservation planner
- 2014 Tony Travers, academic and journalist
- 2015 Sir Peter Hendy CBE, chairman of Network Rail
- 2016 Sir Terry Farrell CBE, architect
- 2017 Loyd Grossman CBE, television presenter and chairman of The Royal Parks
- 2018 Ben Derbyshire, architect and president of RIBA
- 2019 Jude Kelly CBE, theatre director and producer
- 2020 Robert Elms, writer and broadcaster
- 2021 Not Hosted
- 2022 Not Hosted
- 2023 Georgia Gould, politician
