= Stoke-on-Trent Green Belt =

Area protected from development in West Midlands region, England

Stoke green belt showing extents, districts and counties. Stoke-on-Trent green belt County borders District/council borders North West green belt

The Stoke-on-Trent Green Belt is a green belt environmental and planning policy that regulates the rural space throughout mainly the West Midlands region of England. It is contained within the counties of Cheshire and Staffordshire. Essentially, the function of the designated area is to prevent surrounding towns and villages within the Stoke-on-Trent conurbation from further convergence. It is managed by local planning authorities on guidance from central government.

== Purpose ==
The following policy was stated for the creation of the green belt area by Staffordshire County Council in 1967:

- "To limit the expansion into adjoining open country of the urban areas of North Staffordshire forming part of the Potteries Conurbation.
- To prevent the following towns and settlements in the adjoining open area from merging with the Potteries Conurbation and with other settlements;

a) The built up areas of Kidsgrove and Biddulph;
b) The settlements of Brown Edge, Endon, Stanley, Bagnall, Stanley Moor, Norton Green, Baddeley Green, Baddeley Edge, Light Oaks, Werrington, Cellarhead, Caverswall, Cookshill, Blythe Bridge, Forsbrook, Meir Heath, Barlaston, Alsagers Bank, Halmer End, Miles Green, Wood Lane, Bignall End and Audley.

- To prevent the coalescence of the following towns and settlements around the Potteries Conurbation:

Leek with Longsdon; Leek with Cheddleton; Longsdon with Cheddleton; Longsdon with Endon; Cheddleton with Folly Lane; Folly Lane with Wetley Rocks; Wetley Rocks with Cellarhead; Cheadle with Kingsley Holt; Kingsley with Kingsley Holt; Cheadle with Dihorne; Cheadle with Forsbrook; Fulford with Meir Heath; Stone with Oulton; Stone with Yarfield; Tittensor with Barlaston; Barlaston with Stone; Madeley Heath with Madeley; Betley with Audley.

- To maintain the present open character of the land within the North Staffordshire Green Belt and to prevent the coalescence of smaller settlements not mentioned above."

Cheshire County Council set out their policy in 1961:

... prevent the outward spread of development from Greater Manchester, Merseyside and the Potteries."

== Geography ==
Land area taken up by the green belt is 43,836 hectares (438.36 km^{2}; 169.25 sq mi), 0.5% of the total land area of England (2010). The main coverage of the area is within northern Staffordshire, extending into southern Cheshire. The North West Green Belt area surrounding Macclesfield lies close to the Stoke-on-Trent green belt, being just over a mile away at its closest extent from the River Dane which forms the northern boundary for the area.

Landscape facilities and features within the green belt area include the Cudmore Fisheries, Meaford Energy Centre, Millennium Topograph in Downs Banks, JCB Harewood Estate, Rudyard Lake, Meir Heath, Barlaston Common, Chatterley Whitfield Country Park and enterprise centre, Bucknall Reservoir, the Trent & Mersey and Caldon canals, the River Blythe and Trent, Wedgwood Museum and estate, Strongford Sewage Treatment Works, and Trent Vale Pumping Station.

A large portion of the western boundary is formed by the West Coast Main Line railway. Towns on the outer extents of the green belt include Alsager, Cheadle, Congleton, Crewe, Leek, and Stone. Towns and villages within the area include Biddulph, Endon, Kidsgrove, Rudyard, Scholar Green and Swynnerton. Due to the green belt lying across county borders, responsibility and co-ordination lies with several district councils and unitary authorities as these are the local planning authorities.

== See also ==
- Green belt (United Kingdom)
