= Burton upon Trent and Swadlincote Green Belt =

Area protected from development in the East Midlands, England

Map of the belt, showing its boundary, along with surrounding parishes and district borders. Green belt East Staffordshire/South Derbyshire district border Parish borders 1 Newton Solney 2 Winshill 3 Brizlincote 4 Bretby 5 Stapenhill 6 Drakelow 7 Unparished (Swadlincote containing Oversetts, Newhall) 8 Cauldwell 9 Castle Gresley Scalable map

The Burton upon Trent and Swadlincote Green Belt is a green belt environmental and planning policy that regulates the rural space between the towns of Burton upon Trent and Swadlincote, in the counties of Derbyshire and Staffordshire, within the East Midlands region of England. Essentially, the function of the green belt in this location is to prevent the towns merging by lessening urban sprawl. It is managed by local planning authorities on guidance from central government.

== Geography ==
Land area taken up by the green belt is 720 hectares (7.2 km^{2}; 2.8 sq mi), making it the smallest in the country. The main coverage is within the South Derbyshire district, mainly concentrated within the unparished area around Swadlincote and the parish of Bretby, with smaller tracts in the parishes of Castle Gresley, Cauldwell and Drakelow.

It 'washes' over the ribbon developments at Stanhope Bretby along the A511 road, small commercial properties at Middle Place in the Bretby Stoneware Industrial Estate, private residences by the rural end of the Sunnyside country lane, and at Stanton along the A444 road, which has the only large scale development with its sewage works.

Small portions are within greenfield land and farmland in the Brizlincote, Stapenhill, and Winshill parishes of East Staffordshire, although it does not extend to the settlements themselves. Due to the green belt lying across two counties, responsibility lies with the South Derbyshire and East Staffordshire district councils as these are the local planning authorities.

== History ==
The green belt was first proposed in 1980 during a review of the Derbyshire Structure Plan. It was later approved by central government and termed the South Derbyshire Green Belt. It took some time to define the boundaries to some accuracy after further local and government consultation, with a localised council plan subsequently being adopted in April 1983. Later boundary changes have meant it presently extends cross-border into Staffordshire.

== See also ==
- Green belt (United Kingdom)
