= York Green Belt =

Urban regulation and planning policy

Green belt showing extents, districts and counties. City of York green belt County borders District borders South and West Yorkshire green belt

The City of York Green Belt is an environmental and planning policy that regulates the rural space within the Yorkshire and the Humber region of England. The York city green belt is within the county of North Yorkshire. The policy's core function is to manage development around York and the surrounding area, preserving its setting and historic character, discouraging urban sprawl, and the convergence of outer villages into the city's built up areas. It is managed by local planning authorities on guidance from central government.

== Purpose ==
There are five aims for the green belt around York:

- Maintain the city's historic setting and character;
- Keep the urban sprawl of York in check;
- Preserve the surrounding countryside from development;
- Stop nearby settlements converging towards each other;
- Promoting the recycling of brownfield or other urban land.

== Geography ==
Formally created in 1980 after being an interim policy since the 1950s, the local development plan defines the green belt outer edge as being 'about 6 miles from York'. Land area taken up by the green belt is 25,553 hectares (255.53 km^{2}; 98.66 sq mi) hectares (0.2% of the total land area of England (2010). The green belt nearly covers the city except for built-up area and larger surrounding villages. It extends into the North Yorkshire district and surrounds the city, responsibility and co-ordination lies with the city and North Yorkshire district councils. The rural areas and smaller villages of the district are "washed over" by the green belt, meaning there is limited development scope in these areas: Acaster Malbis, Askham Bryan, Askham Richard, Deighton, Heslington, Hessay, Holtby, Hopgrove, Knapton, Murton, Naburn and Rufforth.

== See also ==
- Green belt (United Kingdom)
