= Green belt (United Kingdom) =

British urban planning policy to maintain countryside around cities

Designated areas of green belt in England; the Metropolitan Green Belt outlined in red

In British town planning, the green belt is a policy for controlling urban growth. The term, coined by Octavia Hill in 1875, refers to a ring of countryside where urbanisation will be resisted for the foreseeable future, maintaining an area where local food growing, forestry and outdoor leisure can be expected to prevail. The fundamental aim of green belt policy is to prevent urban sprawl by keeping land permanently open, and consequently the most important attribute of green belts is their openness.

The Metropolitan Green Belt around London was first proposed by the Greater London Regional Planning Committee in 1935. The Town and Country Planning Act 1947 then allowed local authorities to include green belt proposals in their development plans. In 1955, Minister of Housing Duncan Sandys encouraged local authorities around the country to consider protecting land around their towns and cities by the formal designation of clearly defined green belts.

Green belt policy has been criticised for reducing the amount of land available for building and therefore pushing up house prices, as 70% of the cost of building new houses is the purchase of the land (up from 25% in the late 1950s).

== England and Wales ==
The government formerly set out its policies and principles towards green belts in England and Wales in Planning Policy Guidance Note 2: Green Belts, but this planning guidance was superseded by the National Planning Policy Framework (NPPF) in March 2012. Planning authorities are strongly urged to follow the NPPF's detailed advice when considering whether to permit additional development in the green belt. In the green belt there is a general presumption against inappropriate development, unless very special circumstances can be demonstrated to show that the benefits of the development will outweigh the harm caused to the green belt. The NPPF sets out what would constitute appropriate development in the green belt.

According to the NPPF, there are five stated purposes of including land within the green belt:

- To check the unrestricted sprawl of large built-up areas
- To prevent neighbouring towns from merging into one another
- To assist in safeguarding the countryside from encroachment
- To preserve the setting and special character of historic towns
- To assist in urban regeneration, by encouraging the recycling of derelict and other urban land.

Once an area of land has been defined as green belt, the stated opportunities and benefits include:

- Providing opportunities for access to the open countryside for the urban population
- Providing opportunities for outdoor recreation near urban areas
- The retention of attractive landscapes and the enhancement of landscapes, near to where people live
- Improvement of damaged and derelict land around towns
- The securing of nature conservation interests
- The retention of land for local food growing, forestry and related uses.

=== England ===
Although 16 city and town urban cores are identified by the Ministry of Housing, Communities and Local Government (MHCLG) who are the present central government department maintaining responsibility for green belts, a countryside interest group, Campaign to Protect Rural England (CPRE) continue to group these into 14 green belt areas, the North West green belt encompassing three urban cores.

The area designated as green belt land in England as at 12 October 2023 was estimated at 1,638,420 hectares, about 13 per cent of the land area.

Green belt (MHCLG)	Green belt (CPRE)	Urban core
Bath and Bristol	Avon Green Belt	Bristol and Bath
Birmingham	West Midlands Green Belt	West Midlands, Birmingham, Coventry
Blackpool	North West Green Belt	Blackpool
Burton upon Trent	Burton upon Trent and Swadlincote Green Belt	Burton upon Trent and Swadlincote
Cambridge	Cambridge Green Belt	Cambridge
Carnforth, Lancaster and Morecambe	North West Green Belt	Lancaster, Morecambe, Carnforth
Derby and Nottingham	Nottingham and Derby Green Belt	Nottingham and Derby
Gloucester	Gloucester and Cheltenham Green Belt	Gloucester and Cheltenham
London area	Metropolitan Green Belt	Greater London
Merseyside and Greater Manchester	North West Green Belt	Merseyside, Greater Manchester
Oxford	Oxford Green Belt	Oxford
South and West Yorkshire	South and West Yorkshire Green Belt	South Yorkshire and West Yorkshire
South West Hampshire	South West Hampshire/South East Dorset Green Belt	Dorset, Bournemouth and Poole
Stoke-on-Trent	Stoke-on-Trent Green Belt	Stoke-on-Trent
Tyne and Wear	North East Green Belt	Tyne and Wear, Durham and Hexham
York	York Green Belt	York

The distribution of green belt designated land by region of England as in 2003, 2013 and 2023 was as follows:

Region	2003 area (hectares)	2013 area (hectares)	2023 area (hectares)*
East/London/South East	627,160	580,570	574,040
East Midlands	79,520	78,950	77,410
North East	66,330	73,060	98,550
North West	260,610	262,440	254,350
South West	106,180	110,620	107,970
West Midlands	269,140	269,360	264,510
Yorkshire and the Humber	262,640	264,290	261,600
England total	1,671,580	1,639,290	1,638,420

* Counts are rounded

The total area of green belt land in England since 2003 was as follows:

Year	2003	2004	2006	2007	2008/09	2009/10	2010/11	2011/12	2012/13	2013/14	2017/18
Area (hectares)	1,671,580	▲1,678,190	▼1,631,830	▲1,635,670	▲1,639,650	▼1,639,530	1,639,530	▼1,639,480	▼1,639,160	▼1,638,610	▼1,629,510

As well as any underlying re-designations, changes in green belt area are explained in part by alterations in land designation by local authorities, and may also be influenced by improvements with measurement associated with digital mapping. Note that from 2006, estimates exclude the area of Green Belt land in New Forest DC and Test Valley BC (47,300 hectares) which were designated as New Forest National Park in 2005.

In July 2024 the Labour government announced plans to prioritise building on "poor quality and ugly areas" within England's green belt, including brownfield sites, which it termed the "grey belt". When the policy was introduced in December 2024, the definition was extended to include previously undeveloped land that did not strongly contribute to green belt purposes. There is a degree of subjectivity, as there is no standard approach to the Green Belt Reviews that determine a location’s contribution to green belt purposes. A first series of planning approvals on previously undeveloped Green Belt land followed in the weeks after the Grey Belt concept was adopted into the NPPF.

=== Wales ===
Wales has one green belt, between the cities of Cardiff and Newport.

== Northern Ireland ==
Northern Ireland has 30 green belt areas, accounting for approximately 226,600 hectares, about 16 percent of its total area.

== Scotland ==
Green belt policy in Scotland is set out in Scottish Planning Policy (SPP) 21, published by the Scottish Government in February 2010. On 29 November, the Government published "Green Belt Policy in Scotland 10/85"

As of 2010 Scotland had 10 green belt areas: Aberdeen, Ayr, Clackmannanshire, East Lothian, Edinburgh, Falkirk and Grangemouth, Greater Glasgow, Midlothian and Stirling. There are also plans for green belts around Dunfermline, Perth and St Andrews.

The Scottish Government is clear that the purpose of green belt designation in the development plan as part of the settlement strategy for an area is to:

- direct planned growth to the most appropriate locations and support regeneration,
- protect and enhance the quality, character, landscape setting and identity of towns and cities, and
- protect and give access to open space within and around towns and cities

However, the Scottish Government recognises that certain types of development might actually promote and support appropriate rural diversification:

- Development associated with agriculture, including the re-use of historic agricultural buildings,
- Woodland and forestry, including community woodlands,
- Horticulture, including market gardening and directly connected retailing,
- Recreational uses that are compatible with an agricultural or natural setting, and
- Essential infrastructure such as electronic communications infrastructure and electricity grid connections

The Government requires that locally established green belt plans: maintain the identity of a city by the clearly establishing physical boundaries and preventing coalescence; provide countryside for recreation of denizens; and maintain the landscape setting of the city in question. In its Planning Policy (129), the Scottish Government states that:

“All public bodies, including planning authorities, have a duty to further the conservation of biodiversity under the Nature Conservation (Scotland) Act 2004, and this should be reflected in development plans and development management decisions. Biodiversity is important because it provides natural services and products that we rely on, is an important element of sustainable development and makes an essential contribution to Scotland's economy and cultural heritage.”

== History ==
The term emerged from continental Europe where broad boulevards were increasingly used to separate new development from the centre of historic towns; most notably the Ringstraße in Vienna. Various proposals were put forward from 1890 onwards but the first to garner widespread support was put forward by the London Society in its "Development Plan of Greater London" 1919. Alongside the CPRE they lobbied for a continuous belt (of up to two miles wide) to prevent urban sprawl, beyond which new development could occur.

Implementation of the notion dated from Herbert Morrison's 1934 leadership of the London County Council. It was first formally proposed by the Greater London Regional Planning Committee in 1935, "to provide a reserve supply of public open spaces and of recreational areas and to establish a green belt or girdle of open space". It was again included in an advisory Greater London Plan prepared by Patrick Abercrombie in 1944 (which sought a belt of up to six miles wide). However, it was some 14 years before the elected local authorities responsible for the area around London had all defined the area on scaled maps with some precision (encouraged by Duncan Sandys to designate a belt of some 7–10 miles wide).

The motives for a green belt around London were not just environmental, Frank Pick the CEO of the London Passenger Transport Board made an economic case; he believed that London Underground had a finite potential capacity which would be breached by the growth of the city's population and overall physical size. Pick presented this case to the Barlow Commission (Royal Commission on the Geographical Distribution of the Industrial Population), arguing that if London's radius grew beyond 12–15 miles, the capital's commuter infrastructure could not cope in financial or capacity terms, to the detriment of city's overall economy. He instead made the case for a number of economically self-sufficient new towns beyond a new green belt.

New provisions for compensation in the Town and Country Planning Act 1947 allowed local authorities around the country to incorporate green belt proposals in their first development plans. The codification of Green Belt policy and its extension to areas other than London came with the historic Circular 42/55 inviting local planning authorities to consider the establishment of green belts. This decision was made in tandem with the 1946 New Towns Act, which sought to depopulate urban centres in the South East of England and accommodate people in new settlements elsewhere. Green belt could therefore be designated by local authorities without worry that it would come into conflict with pressure from population growth.

As the outward growth of London was seen to be firmly repressed, residents owning properties further from the built-up area also campaigned for this policy of urban restraint, partly to safeguard their own investments but often invoking an idealised scenic/rustic argument which laid the blame for most social ills upon urban influences. In mid-1971, for example, the government decided to extend the Metropolitan Green Belt northwards to include almost all of Hertfordshire. The Metropolitan Green Belt now covers parts of 68 different Districts or Boroughs.

Since 1955 London's green belt has extended significantly, stretching some 35 miles out in places. London's green belt now covers an area of 516,000 hectares, an area broadly three times larger than that of London itself. The London Society began debate about the city's green belt in 2014 with publication of a report entitled "Green Sprawl". Other organisations, including the Planning Officers Society, have since responded with specific calls for a review and proposals to balance land release with environmental protection. In 2016, the London Society and the All Party Parliamentary Group (APPG) for London's Planning and Built Environment published plans for a 'green web' to replace the green belt in some locations. The ambition is to create a "multifunctional green infrastructure landscape" in which new-build and publicly accessible natural space sat side by side.

Research undertaken by the London School of Economics in 2016 suggests that by 1979, the area covered by green belt in England comprised 721,500 hectares, and by 1993, this had been extended to 1,652,310 hectares.

== Criticism ==
Several academics, policy groups and town planning organisations in recent years have criticised the idea and implementation of green belts in the UK. Green belt policy has been attacked as too rigid in the face of new urban and environmental challenges, principally the lack of housing available in many cities in the UK. The policy has been criticised for reducing the amount of land available for building and therefore pushing up house prices, as 70% of the cost of building new houses is the purchase of the land (up from 25% in the late 1950s). It has also been claimed that areas of green belt can be of unremarkable environmental quality, and may not be well managed or provide the recreational opportunities originally envisaged.

=== Environmental ===
The Town and Country Planning Association, an organisation heavily involved in initiating the concept several decades previously, published a policy statement in 2002, which proposed a more flexible policy which would allow the introduction of green wedge and strategic gap policies rather than green belts, and so permit the expansion of some urban areas. In October 2007, Sir Martin Doughty, then Chair of Natural England, argued for a review of green belts, saying: "The time has come for a greener green belt. We need a 21st century solution to England's housing needs which puts in place a network of green wedges, gaps and corridors, linking the natural environment and people.". Similarly, the London Society published a comprehensive history of the green belt (as it emerged in the first part of the twentieth century) in 2014. Authored by the influential English urbanist Jonathan Manns, this called for a "move away from the simplistic and naïve idea that countryside is a sacrosanct patchwork of medieval hedgerows and towards an empirically informed position which once more recognises housing as a need to be met in locations with appropriate environmental capacity".

=== Effect on house prices ===
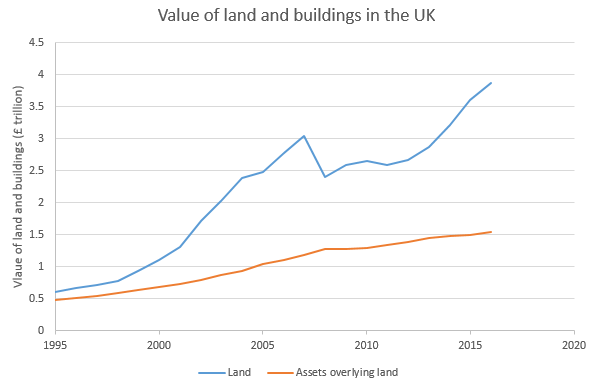
Value of land and buildings in the UK from 1995 to 2016 (trillions).

The Economist has criticised green belt policy, saying that unless more houses are built through reforming planning laws and releasing green belt land, then housing space will need to be rationed out. In March 2014, it was noted that if general inflation had risen as fast as housing prices had since 1971, a chicken would cost £51; and that Britain is "building less homes today than at any point since the 1920s". According to the Institute of Economic Affairs, there is "overwhelming empirical evidence that planning restrictions have a substantial impact on housing costs" and are the main reason why housing is two and a half times more expensive in 2011 than it was in 1975. The free market Adam Smith Institute is a particular critic of the green belt, and has claimed that removing the green belt from land within ten minutes walk of a railway station would release enough land to build 1 million homes.

In response to the claims made by the Adams Smith Institute, the Royal Town Planning Institute commissioned the Building In The Green Belt? report to look into the commuting patterns in London's metropolitan green belt. The study found only 7.4% of commuters, who lived near a railway station actually travelled to London by train on a regular basis with the vast majority (72%) travelling by private vehicle to jobs in their hometown and to other places not within London. Thus the proposal put forward in the Adam Smith report could result in 3.96 to 7.45 million additional car journeys per week on already congested roads around London. CPRE say it is a myth to connect green belts to rising house prices, since there is no clear difference in house prices between cities with green belts and cities without them, and both land and house prices are inflated by other factors such as investment.

Lewis Abbott has identified green belt barriers to urban expansion as one of several major protectionist political-economic barriers to house building with negative effects on the supply, cost/prices, and quality of new homes. (The others include new housing development taxes and quasi-taxes; political discrimination against particular classes of new housing supplier, household consumer, and housing product; and controls on housing technical-product development – in particular, the blocking of innovative low-cost house building using new materials and production technologies). Abbott argues that the greenbelts actually defeat their own stated objective of saving the countryside and open spaces. By preventing existing towns and cities from extending normally and organically, they result in more land-extensive housing developments further out – i.e., the establishment beyond the greenbelts of new communities with lower building densities, their own built infrastructure and other facilities, and greater dependence on cars and commuting, etc. Meanwhile, valuable urban green space and brownfield sites best suited to industry and commerce are lost in existing conurbations as more and more new housing is crammed into them.

Commentators such as Alan Evans and Tom Papworth have called for outright abolition of green belts, principally on the grounds that by inhibiting the free use of land they restrict home ownership.

However, in England, where 65% of people are property-owners who benefit from scarcity of building land, the concept of "green belt" has become entrenched as a fundamental part of government policy, and the possibility of reviewing boundaries is often viewed with considerable hostility by environmental charities, neighbouring communities and their elected representatives.

== Related concepts ==
The general concept of "green belt" has evolved in recent years to encompass "Greenspace" and "Greenstructure", taking into account urban greenspace, an important aspect of sustainable development in the 21st century. However, while in general these concepts are quite distinct in the UK from the green belt as a statutory development plan designation, an exception occurs in London where land may be designated as "Metropolitan Open Land" (MOL). Areas of MOL are subject to the same planning restrictions as the green belt while lying within the urban area. In 2005, the European Commission's COST Action C11 (COST European Cooperation in Science and Technology) undertook in-depth city case studies into cities across 15 European countries. Sheffield was one such case study city for the UK. Conclusions were published in "Case studies in Greenstructure Planning".

== See also ==
- Green belt
- Intergenerational equity
- London commuter belt
- NIMBY
- Smart growth
- Urban growth boundary
