= Local planning authority =

Type of governmental body in UK and India

A local planning authority (LPA) is the local government body that is empowered by law to exercise urban planning functions for a particular area. They exist in the United Kingdom and India.

== United Kingdom ==
=== Mineral planning authorities ===
The role of mineral planning authority is held by county councils, unitary authorities and national park authorities.

=== Waste planning authorities ===
The role of waste planning authority is held by county councils, unitary authorities and national park authorities.

=== England ===
For most matters, the planning authority is the borough, district or unitary council for the area. The non-metropolitan county councils (where they exist) are the planning authorities for minerals, waste and their own developments, such as most schools, care homes, fire stations and highways. The Mayor of London has the right to become the local planning authority for individual applications already submitted to a local planning authority.

As of August 2023 the local planning authorities in England are:

- 226 district councils
- 62 unitary authority councils
- 36 metropolitan borough councils
- 32 London borough councils
- 21 county councils (for minerals, waste and county council development only)
- 10 national park authorities
- City of London Corporation
- Old Oak and Park Royal Development Corporation
- London Legacy Development Corporation
- Council of the Isles of Scilly

=== Wales ===
There are 25 local planning authorities in Wales. Of these, 22 are local authorities and 3 are national park authorities.

=== Scotland ===
In Scotland, where all of the local authorities are unitary, the term 'planning authority' is used without the 'local' prefix.

== See also ==
- Delegated powers (UK town planning)
- Planning permission
