= Development of stadiums in English football =

A large number of English football clubs have ongoing schemes to redevelop existing grounds, or to move to newly constructed stadiums. A trend towards all-seater stadiums was initially prescribed in 1990 by the Taylor Report, and was originally a condition only of Premier League admission. It has now become a requirement that within three years of a club's first promotion to the Championship all paying spectators are seated, even if the club is subsequently relegated. This article provides an (incomplete) list and description of those clubs who have planned new stadiums or refurbishments, or who have already moved or refurbished their stadiums since around the time of the Taylor Report.

The following list includes clubs that are based in Wales but play in the English football league system.

== History ==
When Scunthorpe United moved to Glanford Park in 1988, it was the first time a Football League club had moved to a new purpose-built home since 1956. Up to this point, most sides were playing in grounds that had been largely structurally unchanged for most of the 20th century. One of the few clubs to play in a completely rebuilt post World War II stadium was Manchester United, whose stadium had been rebuilt due to bomb damage during the war, and significantly altered in the 1960s and again in the early 1980s.

Ground improvements were seldom, most clubs rarely reached their capacity on a regular basis, and poor facilities were commonplace – this particularly being the case between 1979 and 1986, when attendances fell, with this fall in spectators being blamed largely on increased hooliganism, as well as the economic downturn and sharp rise in unemployment that occurred in the early 1980s. The main source of income came from gate receipts, and most additional money was spent on transfers. It was not until the growing concern in the 1980s about the safety of existing stadiums, that clubs began to examine the possibilities offered by redeveloping their grounds. This was first highlighted in May 1985, when 56 fans were burnt to death in a fire at the Bradford City stadium, and even more so in the aftermath of the Hillsborough disaster of April 1989, which led to the death of 97 Liverpool fans at an FA Cup semi-final. Poor maintenance was seen as the main reason for the fire at Bradford, while the presence of perimeter fencing and standing areas (as well as loss of police control) were seen as the main factors in the Hillsborough tragedy.

In January 1990, the Taylor Report recommended the conversion of all Football League stadiums to all-seater arenas although this was subsequently applied just to the top two levels with effect from the 1994–95 season. The report had ordered third and fourth tier teams to follow suit by 1999, but clubs at this level were allowed to continue with standing accommodation.

This was given governmental financial assistance, and while unpopular with many fans, attendances began to rise again in the 1990s.

The new all-seater arrangement tended to be more popular with both the clubs and football authorities, as they had the combined benefits of being safer and more profitable.

The boom in television rights following the creation of the Premier League in 1992 allowed a number of clubs to further expand their stadiums, or even move to new ones. Realising the commercial possibilities of new stadiums, many ambitious outfits constructed purpose-built stadiums often on the outskirts of cities or in urban regeneration areas. It has become common for clubs to tie these new stadiums in with residential or leisure complexes.

A number of lower-league clubs had plans for ground improvements halted following the collapse of ITV Digital and the lucrative broadcasting contract they had agreed. Following the re-sale of rights, a number of these programmes have been re-activated in recent years, and some of the heaviest stadium redevelopment has been in the lower divisions. Most teams with ambitions of eventual promotion to the Premier League have plans for continued work on their grounds to bring them up to an appropriate standard. Even the biggest clubs have been affected, Manchester United have heavily rebuilt and expanded Old Trafford since 1992, while Arsenal moved to the Emirates Stadium in 2006.

In 2015, every stadium in England have to adhere to Accessible Stadia guideline, which each clubs are required to have a certain minimum number of amenity and easy access spaces with accessible toilets. Since then most of England stadium have more accessibility for disabled.

Under the bullet Current stadium status below, "New" means built after 1988 and replacing a former venue, while "Reconstructed" means the club has merely made improvements to their stadium.

== Premier League ==
=== AFC Bournemouth ===
- Stadium: Vitality Stadium
- Capacity: 11,364
- Current stadium status: Reconstructed.

AFC Bournemouth's Dean Court ground was completely rebuilt in 2001, with the pitch rotated ninety degrees from its original position. The stadium was also moved away from adjacent housing. Although it was rebuilt as a three sided stadium, seats were placed on the undeveloped South End in the autumn of 2005. These seats were removed when the club was relegated to the bottom tier in 2008 but installed once more following promotion back to League One in 2010. Following promotion to the Sky Bet Championship in 2013 the club installed a larger, roofed temporary stand, bringing the total ground capacity just shy of 12,000. This was named the Ted MacDougall Stand. After a successful debut Premier League campaign, the club submitted a planning application to Bournemouth Borough Council to redevelop the temporary Ted MacDougall Stand with a much larger one which would take the capacity of the ground to 14,529. However, the club are now looking to expand to 20,196 in two phases, with the possibility of further expanding to 23,000 in a third phase via the North Stand.

=== Arsenal ===
- Stadium: Emirates Stadium
- Capacity: 60,704
- Current stadium status: New.

Arsenal moved to the Emirates Stadium in 2006, which has massively boosted club income. Emirates Stadium is the fifth largest club ground in England, after Old Trafford, West Ham's London Stadium, Anfield, and Tottenham's new White Hart Lane. The Emirates replaced Highbury, where the club had been based since 1913, which itself had been substantially updated in the early 1990s and reduced capacity from 59,000 to an all-seater 38,500 by 1993. However, this was deemed inadequate by 1998 and led to the club's directors deciding that relocation was necessary, prompting the club to build a new stadium, with the site at Ashburton Grove being selected in November 1999 (after a bid to buy the old Wembley failed) and work beginning in the spring of 2004. It finally opened for the 2006–07 season.

As of 2025, the club are actively investigating options to increase the capacity of the Emirates Stadium from its current 60,704 to around 75,000 - 80,000. The club has engaged architects and planners to examine structural redesigns, noting that the existing stadium design (with a roof supported at just eight primary points) presents significant engineering constraints.

Early projections suggested that the project could cost more than £500 million, potentially rising to £600-650 million, depending on the final design and associated infrastructure requirements.

Key cost drivers include replacing or altering the roof, adding new seating (including premium & hospitality areas), improvements to transport links and public infrastructure around the stadium, and ensuring compliance with safety and planning regulation.

In terms of timeline, the project remains at an early concept and feasibility stage. Arsenal co-chair Josh Kroenke has confirmed internal conversations are underway.

The earliest realistic window for construction is likely after the 2026–27 season, to allow for detailed design, planning permission, and securing necessary funding. If carried through, the expanded capacity is expected to meaningfully increase matchday income; some estimates project matchday revenue rising from £150 million in 2024–25 to perhaps £196 million (based on pro rata scaling) or more, depending on how much of the additional capacity is allocated to higher-yield premium seating.

Challenges include: limited space in the surrounding area for outward expansion, planning and transport constraints, disruption during construction (which may require phased works or temporary reduced capacity), and ensuring the return on investment is proportionate to the scale of expenditure.

=== Aston Villa ===
- Stadium: Villa Park
- Capacity: 42,657
- Current stadium status: Reconstructed. 7,400 North Stand expansion plan.

Aston Villa are currently increaseing Villa Park from 42,000 to 50,000 seats by expanding the North Stand. Villa Park has been all-seater since 1994, when the Holte End was rebuilt, but did not reach its current capacity until the Trinity Road Stand was rebuilt in the 2000–01 season. No major developments have taken place since, although plans have been in the pipeline since the late 1990s to take the stadium's capacity to more than 50,000.

An accompanying commercial and entertainment venue dubbed "Villa Live" was approved in December 2022 by Birmingham City Council. and was completed several years later.

=== Brentford ===
- Stadium: Brentford Community Stadium
- Capacity: 17,250
- Current stadium status: New

Brentford F.C. had been considering relocating from Griffin Park since the 1990s, and after several years of effort, the club announced in December 2007 that they had been given an option on the site at Lionel Road, and announced two months later a link-up with property developer Barratt Homes to develop the site. It wasn't until 2020 when they were able to move to their new stadium, the 17,250-capacity Brentford Community Stadium, located less than a mile from Griffin Park, keeping the club in the town of Brentford.

In 2014 the club announced that planning permission had been granted for the new stadium. After a number of delays, a compulsory purchase order was finally granted by the London Borough of Hounslow in late 2016, allowing the club to take full possession of the site. In February 2017, Brentford announced that they expected to start work on the new stadium in March. They moved into the new stadium for the 2020–2021 season.

=== Brighton and Hove Albion ===
- Stadium: Falmer Stadium (The American Express (AMEX) Community Stadium)
- Capacity: 31,800
- Current stadium status: New.

Brighton's 14-year wait for a permanent home came to an end when Brighton moved to Falmer Stadium, in 2011, with a capacity of 22,000 seats. The stadium had built into its design the ability to have capacity increased to 30,750, which has been completed as of the end of the 2012–13 season. This has been done by filling in all four corners of the stadium and adding an extra tier to the top of the East Stand. Extra corporate boxes and hospitality suites have also been added to the existing South Stand mezzanine, and the 1901 Club West Stand middle tier has been extended around each corner. Currently, the club are planning to further increase capacity, and its current amount is 31,800.

Brighton had been without a permanent home since May 1997, when they left the Goldstone Ground after 95 years after it was sold to a developer in an effort to ease the club's financial crisis. Two seasons were spent ground-sharing with Gillingham before the club returned to Brighton to a temporary home at Withdean Stadium, although the aim from the outset was to build a new stadium in the Falmer area.

=== Chelsea ===
- Stadium: Stamford Bridge
- Capacity: 41,837
- Current stadium status: Reconstructed. Further reconstruction on hold indefinitely.

Following Roman Abramovich's takeover, Chelsea have examined expanding their current home at Stamford Bridge to a capacity of over 50,000. Numerous problems over health and safety issues have stalled this, because due to the stadium's location fans can only exit onto the Fulham Road. The club have thus been linked with moves to a number of potential sites in west London, including a site at Earl's Court, although the club have indicated no such plans exist. A further stumbling block is that the club's naming rights are owned by the Chelsea Pitch Owners, which also owns the Stamford Bridge freehold. As a condition for using the Chelsea FC name, the club has to play its first team matches at Stamford Bridge. A move to a new stadium could mean the club having to change their name. Stamford Bridge was extensively rebuilt between 1993 and 1998, with three stands being replaced and the circular track between the pitch and stands being removed, and the only pre-1993 stand at the stadium being the 1974 East Stand structure. This achieved a 34,000 all-seater capacity which had been given the go-ahead in July 1990. The current capacity of just under 42,000 was reached in 2001.

In December 2015, Chelsea Football Club submitted a planning application to the local authority to build a new 60,000-seat stadium on the Stamford Bridge site, which would match the capacity of Arsenal's Emirates Stadium.

=== Crystal Palace ===
- Stadium: Selhurst Park
- Capacity: 25,486
- Current stadium status: Reconstructed.

In January 2011, Crystal Palace announced plans to move from their Selhurst Park home to return to the Crystal Palace National Sports Centre (on the site of the original ground the club left in 1915, a stadium that also hosted the FA Cup final from 1895 to 1914). The plans involve demolishing the existing structure and redeveloping it into a 40,000-seater purpose-built football stadium. Tottenham Hotspur F.C. also released plans to redevelop the NSC into a 25,000-seater stadium, maintaining it as an athletics stadium, as part of their plans to redevelop the Olympic Stadium after the 2012 Summer Olympics and Paralympics. However, Spurs' failure to secure the site, which instead went to West Ham United has left the road clear for Palace to pursue the site.

Their current Selhurst Park home has been all-seater since the mid-1990s, holding more than 26,000 spectators. In December 2017, the club announced plans to undertake a redevelopment of the Main Stand at Selhurst Park, raising the capacity to approximately 34,000, with the new structure ready by 2021.

=== Everton ===
- Stadium: Hill Dickinson Stadium
- Capacity: 52,888
- Current stadium status: New.

Everton announced they were to relocate to a new stadium in Bramley-Moore Dock, which would replace Goodison, their home for over 130 years. The site was preferred in 2017, and the initial and final designs were introduced two years later, with the planning application being submitted in December. Despite an objection from Historic England, the city council of Liverpool approved the stadium on 23 February 2021, and the government gave the stadium the official green light after the communities secretary opted to not intervene with the club's plans. The initial capacity of the stadium would be 52,888 with a potential to expand to 62,000. On 26 July 2021, Everton began to occupy Bramley-Moore Dock and work there was officially commenced on 10 August 2021.

The first plans for relocation were announced in 1996. A site at King's Dock was identified and bid for in 2000, with a view to building a new stadium with 55,000 to 60,000 seats. These plans were then shelved in 2003 when chairman Bill Kenwright said that the club could not raise adequate funds.

A few years later, the club then decided to go through "Destination Kirkby", but this generated a large amount of controversy, as it was beyond the city limits of Liverpool. In June 2008 Knowsley council approved the new stadium in Kirkby, however, following a public inquiry that was held in December 2008, the stadium was rejected by the Secretary of State in November 2009. It is planned to have 50,401 seats initially, with potential to increase to 60,000 at a later date.

The club's former stadium, Goodison Park, has been all-seater (with a capacity of nearly 40,000; currently 39,414) since 1994, when a new stand was built at one end of the ground. The Main Stand was built in 1970, while the two remaining stands are refurbished interwar structures.

=== Fulham ===
- Stadium: Craven Cottage
- Capacity: 29,589
- Current stadium status: Reconstructed.

Since Fulham's promotion to the Premier League, and the conversion of Craven Cottage to an all-seater stadium, the club have been slowly adding to the capacity of the ground every summer. There are periodic reports of a new stadium in White City to be shared with Queens Park Rangers, but such plans are not currently being pursued by either club, with both concentrating on developing their existing grounds. Craven Cottage was the final top division stadium to feature standing accommodation when Fulham were promoted in 2001, but Taylor Report regulations meant it closed a year later. During this period there was intermittent rumours of the Cottage being sold and Fulham possibly purchasing land at Battersea Power Station or elsewhere in West London. Thus Fulham ground-shared with rivals Queens Park Rangers for two years at Loftus Road until they returned to an all-seater Craven Cottage. The plan at the time had been for Craven Cottage to reach over 30,000 capacity, but these were delayed due to opposition from local residents and at first the club had to settle for a 22,000-seat stadium.

There have been gradual increases in capacity since Fulham's return, with the capacity now being 25,700. In 2012, the local council approved raising Craven Cottage's capacity to 30,000. The latest plans include changes made by their new owner Shahid Khan after he purchased the club in 2013, with construction to begin in summer of 2019. The new plan includes a riverwalk which extends up to 11m into the River Thames, which some opponents feel will set a dangerous precedent for future development along the river. On 22 May 2019, Fulham appointed Buckingham Group Contracting Ltd as the lead contractor for Riverside Stand project.

The development began in summer 2019. The capacity at Riverside Stand increased from 4,689 to 8,650; increasing the overall capacity into 29,600.

=== Ipswich Town ===
- Stadium: Portman Road
- Capacity: 30,311
- Current stadium status: Reconstructed.

Ipswich have plans to modernise Portman Road stadium should they be promoted back to the Premier League, via 'Project Leap'. This would involve the area for the 3,000 seats needed for Premier League away teams, as the current area for away fans is not big enough, and would mean expanding into premium season ticket holders seating.

=== Liverpool ===
- Stadium: Anfield
- Capacity: 60,725

Anfield has been all-seater since the mid-1990s, when the Spion Kop was rebuilt two years after the completion of the Centenary Stand on the southern side of the stadium. The Main Stand dates back to the early 1970s, while the Anfield Road Stand was already all-seater when it was rebuilt in 1997.

In May 2002, Liverpool announced plans to build a new 55,000-seat stadium in Stanley Park, near their current Anfield home. The stadium's planned capacity was then increased to more than 66,000, with preliminary construction beginning in 2007.

The relocation was first proposed in 2000, when the club had been hoping to have a 70,000-seat stadium ready for the 2004–05 season. In May 2002 it was decided that relocation was a more viable option than expansion, when the plans were amended for a less expensive 55,000-seat stadium to be built.

Construction of the new stadium, however, was halted in 2008 due to lack of funds combined with the onset of the recession.

In April 2014 Liverpool F.C. signed a legal agreement with Liverpool City Council and Your Housing Group to redevelop the surrounding Anfield area. This is seen as a significant step towards the renovation of the stadium. The redevelopment was worth around £260 million. On 9 September 2016, the first phase of expansion was completed, bringing the total capacity 54,047. On 10 September, the newly renovated Anfield was opened for its first use in a Premier League game against Leicester City.

Anfield Road expansion plan were allowed to be expired in September 2019 and Liverpool resubmitted a new £60 million plan which will increase Anfield's capacity to 61,000. The expansion plan includes granting permission of permanent hosting concert and other major events such as American Football.

=== Manchester City ===
- Stadium: Etihad Stadium
- Capacity: 55,017
- Current stadium status: New – expansion to 54,000 completed August 2015.

City have played at the City of Manchester Stadium since 2003 (it was completed for the previous year's Commonwealth Games) and for the previous 80 years had played at Maine Road, which had been converted into an all-seater format during the 1990s with the construction of two new stands, giving it a capacity of just over 35,000, although in its early days it had held crowds of more than 80,000.

The decision to relocate to the City of Manchester Stadium was made in 1997, in place of previous plans for Maine Road to be expanded to 45,000 seats, which had initially been postponed a year earlier due to City's relegation.

Manchester City were taken over by the Abu Dhabi United Group in September 2008, and quickly earmarked land around Eastlands for redevelopment. A memorandum of understanding has since been formed with Manchester City Council, and City jointly own 200 acres of land in the vicinity of Eastlands. In July 2011, the City of Manchester Stadium was renamed the Etihad Stadium which would help fund the redevelopment. The first developments include a new state-of-the-art training complex for Manchester City and the local community is to be built nearby the Etihad Stadium with a centrepiece bridge linking the complex to the stadium.

After two seasons with virtually every league match selling out, City announced that they were in the process of applying for planning permission for an expansion of approximately 13,500 seats, which would make the ground the second largest club ground in the United Kingdom, and the seventh largest stadium of any type in the same, at approximately 61,000 total seats.

After receiving planning permission for stadium expansion on 14 February 2014, City announced their intention to begin construction of a third tier of seating on the South Stand only. Although they noted that permission has been received for expansion to the North Stand along with further pitch-side seating, the club is at present holding off on these projects. With the South Stand expansion adding approximately 6,250 seats, the new capacity of the stadium after construction will be just above 54,000.

In August 2015, the 7,000 seat third tier on the South Stand was completed, in time for the start of the 2015–16 football season, raising the stadium's capacity to 55,097. The expansion was designed to be in keeping with the existing roof design. A North Stand third tier has planning approval and work on it was expected to begin by 2023, increasing the capacity to 61,474.

=== Manchester United ===
- Stadium: Old Trafford
- Capacity: 74,879
- Current stadium status: Reconstructed.

Since 1992, Old Trafford has undergone a massive facelift converting the stadium into a near 76,000 all-seater, the largest club stadium in England and in the United Kingdom.

Old Trafford has been United's home since 1910, and after decades of gradual development (and a complete rebuild following bomb damage in World War II) became largely all-seater in the 1992–1993 season when the Stretford End was rebuilt, and completely all-seater the following season once the Scoreboard Paddock had been converted, giving it the country's largest capacity at club level with more than 45,000 seats, although demand for tickets vastly outstripped supply. Further redevelopment took place in 1995–96 when the 30-year-old North Stand was bulldozed to make way for a new three-tier structure. The other two stands at Old Trafford were expanded in the 1999–2000 season and the latest expansion took place in 2006–07 with the enlargement of seating in the quadrants.

=== Newcastle United ===
- Stadium: St James' Park
- Capacity: 52,719
- Current stadium status: Reconstructed.

In 2007 under the chairmanship of Freddy Shepherd, Newcastle United announced plans to increase the capacity of St James' Park by 8,000 to 60,000 by rebuilding the Gallowgate End as part of a £300m scheme to redevelop the stadium and its surrounding area. This would partially cure St James' Park of its current lopsided appearance. The plans appeared to have been shelved upon the 2007 takeover and review of the club by Mike Ashley, who subsequently announced in 2008 he would be selling the club. The club had trouble selling out games in the 2008–09 season as Newcastle headed towards relegation after 16 years in the Premier League, and also in the promotion winning campaign of 2009–10, as they played at a lower level.

St James' Park was initially revamped between 1992 and 1995 to give it a 36,000-seat capacity, but the most recent expansion did not take place until 1999–2000, in time for the 2000–01 season. In 1995, with demand for tickets exceeding the initial all-seater capacity, there had been plans relocate to a new 55,000-seat stadium at Castle Leazes, but these were abandoned in September 1997 in favour of expanding the existing stadium.

In February 2023 Newcastle United repurchased the lease on land behind the Gallowgate End which had been sold by former owner Mike Ashley in 2019 to developers who planned to construct 328 flats, an office block and a 213-bedroom hotel. However the developers fell into administration and a planned council bailout loan was scrapped. In the short-term a fanzone on the site of St. James Metro car park will be created: long-term plans are to expand the Gallowgate End to increase the capacity of St James' Park to 65,000 or new stadium

=== Nottingham Forest ===
- Stadium: City Ground
- Capacity: 30,445
- Current stadium status: Reconstructed.

Nottingham Forest currently play at the 30,602 capacity City Ground. The club had plans to move into a 50,000-seat new stadium in the Clifton area of the city. The club subsequently were also thinking of relocating to the Gamston area of West Bridgford or the Eastcroft area of Nottingham

On 28 February 2019 the club confirmed an extended lease on the City Ground. This extended lease means the club is now able to proceed with plans to redevelop the City Ground and surrounding area. Central to this redevelopment will be the replacement of the current Peter Taylor Stand with a new 10,000-seater stand, and improvements to the Trentside area, Brian Clough and Bridgford Stands. The new Peter Taylor Stand will see the introduction of a museum, a new club shop, range of hospitality lounge options and restaurants and executive boxes.

The club is hopeful that building work will commence at the end of the 2019–20 season. The new, modern, state-of-the-art structure would see the City Ground's capacity reach 38,000 after completion.

=== Tottenham Hotspur ===
- Stadium: Tottenham Hotspur Stadium
- Capacity: 62,850
- Current stadium status: New.

Tottenham have been planning a larger stadium since the late 1990s, however, it was undecided whether this strategy would involve expanding White Hart Lane (which has held some 36,000 all-seated fans since the early 1990s) or moving to a new site. Spurs announced in the Northumberland Development Project (NDP) on 30 October 2008 that the club planned to build a new stadium on the existing White Hart Lane site combined with land purchased or optioned to the north, creating a 56,250-seater stadium. The new development would include leisure facilities, shops, housing, a club museum, public space and also a new base for the Tottenham Hotspur Foundation. Initial public consultations took place in December 2008 and a further consultations on the NDP's more detailed plans were held at the start of April 2009. A planning application was submitted to Haringey Council in October 2009. However, following criticism by English Heritage and other conservation groups about the proposed demolition of listed buildings, the club withdrew the plans in May 2010 in favour of a revised plan which retained the listed buildings and improved the public areas around the stadium.

On 30 September 2010 the Planning Committee of Haringey Council unanimously approved the revised planning application and the Mayor of London gave his approval on 25 November 2010.

After an extended period of negotiations with Haringey Council and the Mayor of London, leading to a Section 106 agreement, planning permissions were issued on 20 September 2011. Following the riots in Tottenham, other parts of London and elsewhere in England in August 2011, the Greater London Authority and Haringey Council announced on 28 September that it would relieve the club of all community infrastructure payments that planners would normally require, estimated at £8.5m, and to provide a further £8.5m for regeneration and infrastructure projects. On 11 July 2014 the Secretary of State for the Department for Communities and Local Government announced that a compulsory purchase order had been granted for the outstanding parcel of land required for the development of the new stadium site. In February 2015 this compulsory purchase order was subject to an unsuccessful legal challenge by the business that owned the land. The anticipated stadium opening date was revised several times.

The new stadium, Tottenham Hotspur Stadium, opened with a ceremony on 3 April 2019 before its first competitive Premier League game, which was against Crystal Palace. It opened with a stadium capacity of 62,062 which has since been increased to 62,303. The new stadium features two pitches—an advanced artificial pitch to be used primarily for American football, and a slide-in grass pitch to be used for association football. This is similar to the setup of the Sapporo Dome in Japan, a venue used for both baseball and association football. On 7 July 2015, Tottenham and the National Football League (NFL) announced that the new stadium would host at least two NFL games each season from 2018 through to 2027. In 2019, 1,194,150 people went to the new Tottenham Hotspur Stadium. The capacity was further increased on 5 August 2019 with additional 148-seat, increased the overall capacity into 62,214. Further 89 seats were added on 17 December 2019 and the capacity increased into 62,303 after being granted permission from Haringey Council. As of now, after adding a further 547 seats, the current capacity here is 62,850.

== Premier League Stadium Expanded Capacity ==
Rank	Stadium	Capacity	Club	Committed Expanded Capacity	Rank with Expansion	Notes
1	Old Trafford	74,879	Manchester United	100,000	1	New stadium planned
3	Tottenham Hotspur Stadium	62,850	Tottenham Hotspur		3	New Stadium
4	Anfield	61,276	Liverpool	61,276	5	Anfield Road Expansion
5	Emirates Stadium	60,704	Arsenal		6	
6	Etihad Stadium	55,017	Manchester City	61,474	4	North Stand Expansion
7	Hill Dickinson Stadium	52,888	Everton	52,888	8	New Stadium plan
8	St James' Park	52,719	Newcastle United		9	65,000 Gallowgate stand expansion Or New Stadium
9	Villa Park	42,095	Aston Villa	50,000	10	
10	Stamford Bridge	40,834	Chelsea	60,000	7	Stadium Reconstruction
14	The American Express Community Stadium	31,876	Brighton & Hove Albion		15	
15	City Ground	30,445	Nottingham Forest		16	
16	Portman Road	30,311	Ipswich Town		17	
17	Craven Cottage	29,589	Fulham	29,600	18	Riverside Stand
18	Selhurst Park	25,486	Crystal Palace	34,000	12	Main Stand expansion
19	Gtech Community Stadium	17,250	Brentford		19	
20	Vitality Stadium	11,364	AFC Bournemouth		20	

== Championship ==
=== Burnley ===
- Stadium: Turf Moor
- Capacity: 21,944
- Current stadium status: Reconstructed.

Since consolidating their place in the Premier League, Burnley have made several structural and cosmetic improvements to Turf Moor. Work has been completed outside the stadium including new a new club shop and corporate facilities, and work has begun building two purpose-built corner stands between the James Hargreaves, Jimmy McIlroy and Bob Lord stands that will house disabled supporters. This work is due to be completed in time for the 2018–19 season.

=== Blackburn Rovers ===
- Stadium: Ewood Park
- Capacity: 31,367
- Current stadium status: Reconstructed.

It was reported in 2009 that there were long-term plans to redevelop the 1988-built Riverside Stand, which would raise Ewood Park's capacity by around 9,000 to 41,000. The stadium became all-seater for the 1994–95 season after a two-year reconstruction programme which saw three of the stadium's stands rebuilt. The reconstruction of the Darwen End saw the demolition of the Fernhurst Mill and the new Jack Walker Stand's construction saw the demolition of some houses along Nuttall Street, so by the time Blackburn were Premier League champions in 1995, the stadium held nearly 32,000 fans all-seated.

=== Blackpool ===
- Stadium: Bloomfield Road
- Capacity: 17,338
- Current stadium status: Reconstructed.

The South Stand was originally projected to be complete by May 2009. On 14 November 2009 it was revealed that the football club hope to work with Urban Regeneration Company, to build a new East Stand that would contain both seating and office/retail space rather than as originally planned for just seating. This will mean a larger stand is to be built which will require additional land to be acquired. The new South Stand was opened in March 2010 and is similar in design to the Stanley Matthews and North stands.

On 13 May 2010, Karl Oyston pledged that construction of the East Stand would begin immediately, so long as they gain promotion to the Premier League. On 14 June the temporary seating comprising the East Stand was removed, which was replaced with a 5,070-seat covered temporary stand, which raised the capacity to around 15,500.

From 28 August 2010, the capacity of Bloomfield Road was raised to 16,220 after the new temporary East Stand was completed.

The South-East corner of Bloomfield Road was "filled-in" in 2012. This increased the capacity by around 500 seats.

=== Bristol City ===
- Stadium: Ashton Gate
- Capacity: 26,462
- Current stadium status: Reconstructed.

On 29 November 2007 it was announced that after over 100 years at Ashton Gate, Bristol City would be moving to a new stadium in South Bristol. This proposed new stadium would have had a capacity of 30,000 seats. At the time Ashton Gate held around 21,000 all-seated spectators and had done so since the mid-1990s, as the initial plan was to upgrade the existing stadium rather than relocate to a new site. In February 2012 the project was delayed by legal rows in the High Court. As an alternative, it was announced that plans for the reconstruction of Ashton Gate were being developed. Following the successful submission of a planning application to Bristol City Council, the decision was taken to rebuild the stadium. The rebuild, completed in 2016, brought the all-seater capacity of Ashton Gate to 27,000. It involved the renovation of the Atyeo Stand interior, a total renovation of the Dolman Stand, rebuilding the former Wedlock stand to the same height as the Dolman Stand, and rebuilding the former Williams stand (now the Lansdown stand) to make it double tiered with executive boxes.

=== Cardiff City ===
- Stadium: Cardiff City Stadium
- Capacity: 33,280
- Current stadium status: New.

A new all-seater stadium, planned since the late 1990s, for Cardiff City opened in 2009 after the club had spent 99 years at nearby Ninian Park, and for three seasons the new stadium was shared with the Cardiff Blues rugby union club. The Cardiff City Stadium has been expanded to hold up to 33,000 fans, and can be extended further to hold up to 60,000. It is to be the second largest stadium in Wales, after the Millennium Stadium, also in the Welsh capital.

=== Coventry City ===
- Stadium: Coventry Building Society Arena
- Capacity: 32,609
- Current stadium status: New.

Coventry City moved to the 32,500 seater Coventry Building Society Arena (then named Ricoh Arena) in 2005, leaving their historic home Highfield Road which was the first all-seater ground in England. Coventry had long planned a move to a purpose-built 45,000-seat stadium, with original suggestions including a retractable roof and pitch à la Dutch club Vitesse Arnhem. Coventry had even hoped to become the home of the new national stadium, joining Birmingham and London in the race to be the new Wembley, but were unsuccessful in their bid. The Ricoh Arena includes a vast exhibition centre built onto the main stand.

A long-winded saga involving unpaid rent stretching back to August 2012 resulted in the club being "locked out" of the Ricoh Arena in May 2013. In response, the club announced that they planned to build a new stadium and move out of the Ricoh Arena. They eventually returned to the Ricoh for the 2014–15 season. Coventry City are now tenants of the rugby union Premiership side Wasps, which purchased the facility in late 2014.

On 7 June 2019 it was reported that talks between SISU and Wasps had again broken down meaning that Coventry would have to play their 2019–20 "home" matches at Birmingham City's St Andrew's ground. On 10 March 2021, it was announced that Coventry City and Wasps had agreed to a ten-year deal, which would mean that the club would return to the stadium from the 2021–22 season. The club still intend to build a new stadium on land near the University of Warwick on the southern edge of the city, as a break clause in their contract will allow them to leave the CBS Arena for their new stadium. Coventry City played their first competitive match back at the Coventry Building Society Arena, on 8 August 2021 when they played Nottingham Forest in the club's first game back at the ground in 2 years and their first Championship game in Coventry since 2012. They won the match 2–1, thanks to a 96th-minute winner from Kyle McFadzean.

=== Huddersfield Town ===
- Stadium: Kirklees Stadium (The John Smith's Stadium)
- Capacity: 24,500
- Current Stadium status: New.

Huddersfield Town's Kirklees Stadium, was opened as the McAlpine Stadium in August 1994. Initially two stands were open, with a third stand opening later in 1994, but eventually the two-tiered North Stand was completed to leave an all seater stadium with a capacity of 24,500 in 1998. The stadium complex includes fitness and leisure facilities built behind the North Stand with gymnasium, swimming pool and hotel facilities and offices. The venture was a tri-partite one with Huddersfield Town, Huddersfield Giants rugby league club and Kirklees Metropolitan Council being shareholders in a 40:20:40 ratio with a company called KSDL. After Huddersfield Town went into administration the 40% shares were bought for £2 by rugby league chairman and owner Ken Davy, and transferred into his own private company Huddersfield Sporting Pride which holds 60% ownership of the stadium complex at present.

There are current plans for significant construction work around the stadium which would provide hotels, shops, a riverside leisure facility, bars and restaurants opposite the stadium and on the golf driving range site and either side of the river. The project, HDOne, would provide ongoing and significant income streams to KSDL, the company which runs and owns the stadium. There is potential for further expansion of the capacity by adding a second tier to the East Stand but no plans are being considered as yet. The North Stand Lower Tier remains as a temporary seating area to facilitate any rock concerts that could be held at the stadium. However, there have not been any in recent years and there is hope that a permanent stand will be constructed here as a standing terrace for home fans.

=== Hull City ===
- Stadium: KCOM Stadium
- Capacity: 25,586
- Current stadium status: New.

Hull City's KC Stadium, which opened in December 2002 with a capacity of more than 25,000 seats to replace Boothferry Park, is designed to provide for future expansion to a capacity of approximately 45,000 by the addition of a second tier on the Arco East Stand. In March 2008 the Hull chairman said an expansion could potentially take place within two years if there was a clear need for further capacity. In January 2011 it was announced that Hull, under new owner Assem Allam, were interested in buying the KC Stadium from Hull City Council in order to redevelop the stadium and the vicinity of it. Consultation with the council commenced in May. These talks broke down in September 2011, leading the club to announce in December 2012 their intention to move into a new stadium should the club achieve promotion back to the Premier League.

When Hull moved to the stadium in December 2002, they were still playing in Division Three (they reached the Premier League in 2008). For the 56 years prior to that, they had played at Boothferry Park but the decision was made to build a new stadium when a takeover by Adam Pearson in 2001 the club's new owner declared his ambition to build a stadium suited to top flight football, as Boothferry Park was too confined to develop a stadium fit for top division football. The stadium had also fallen into disrepair during the 1990s, as Hull's precarious financial position at the time meant that maintenance costs could often not be met.

=== Leeds United ===
- Stadium: Elland Road
- Capacity: 37,608
- Current stadium status: Reconstructed.

At one point, while flying high in Europe in 2001, Leeds United were examining a potential move to a new 50,000-seat stadium in nearby Stourton, while there were also ambitious plans to redevelop Elland Road as a 90,000-seat "Wembley of the North". Leeds United are currently exploring the possibility of expanding Elland Road, according to the new vice chairman of the Premier League side Paraag Marathe, taking the capacity to over 50,000. in June 2021 LCC announced "Leeds United reviewed their stadium development ambitions and want to preserve their ability to deliver an expanded 60,000-seater stadium at Elland Road, as opposed to a 50,000 seat capacity previously agreed with Leeds City Council."

The stadium became all-seater in 1994, following the refurbishment of "The Kop" (now the Don Revie Stand), and also following the reconstruction of the East Stand two years earlier as a 15,100-seat stand, which gave Elland Road a capacity of more than 40,000 seats. After the East Stand was redeveloped in order to include more executive boxes, its overall capacity was reduced to under 38,000.

=== Luton Town ===
- Stadium: Kenilworth Road
- Capacity: 10,356
- Current stadium status: Reconstructed.

The club were planning to move to a 20,000-seat stadium near the M1, outside of Luton, but these plans have been delayed because of the club's financial difficulties. The club has been intending to move since the 1950s, when it was proposed to build a 50,000-seater stadium in the Lewsey Park area of the town. More recently, relocation has been in the pipeline since the early 1990s. Firstly, it was intended to move to the Kohlerdome, named after David Kohler, an indoor stadium seating 20,000. This was blocked at planning permission due to issues surrounding improvements at the nearby junction 10 of the M1 motorway. An appeal against the decision was unsuccessful. In 2001, land was bought in order to build a new stadium, and in 2003 the club's commitment to the 15,000-seat stadium project was reiterated. However, the plans were cancelled in 2005, reportedly due to London Luton Airport's attempt to expand in the area; the airport denied this was the case. This prompted the club to propose a 20,000-seater stadium development to be built outside the town's boundaries, near the villages of Harlington and Toddington, near junction 12 of the M1. Fierce opposition by the fans and the eventually slide into administration saw these plans evaporate. Kenilworth Road was converted to all-seater capacity of around 10,200 following the club's promotion into the Championship in 2005, and in October 2012 the club announced their intention to add more seats to two stands. Luton now have planning permission for a 17,500 (rising to 23,500) at Power Court in the centre of the town.

=== Middlesbrough ===
- Stadium: Riverside Stadium
- Capacity: 34,742
- Current stadium status: New.

Following Middlesbrough's promotion back to the Premier League capacity attendance has become the norm again and ground expansion a real future possibility. Much will depend on the clubs on-field success and the chairman's willingness to expand though. They have planning permission to expand by another 7,000 seats. If England had been successful in bidding to host the 2018 FIFA World Cup, the expansion would have been likely to occur to ensure consideration as a World Cup venue. However, England lost the bid.

Middlesbrough have played at the Riverside since 1995, when they moved from Ayresome Park in the first relocation of a top division club's stadium for 72 years. The stadium, which held 30,000 seated fans on its completion, is located on the site of a former chemical works on the banks of the Middlesbrough dock and its channel to the River Tees. The land for the stadium was gifted to the club by the Teesside Development Corporation for a nominal £1 fee in the hope it would spur development of the disused former dock area. The stadium was the largest newly built stadium in post-war England, and the initial success of the new ground is considered to have spurred on other clubs such as Sunderland and Derby County to move from their traditional homes to newly built Taylor-compliant stadiums in designated redevelopment zones.

Ayresome Park's location meant that it would have impractical to achieve an all-seater capacity of more than 20,000.

The stadium took a mere 32 weeks to build, with the planned relocation being announced in late 1993 and work beginning just a year later.

Demand meant the stadium was expanded in 1998 to take the capacity to 35,100, but subsequent reorganisation and the installation of a big screen has seen the capacity reduced marginally to 34,742. Following promotion to the Premier League further reorganisation has reduced capacity further to 33,746.

=== Millwall ===
- Stadium: The Den
- Capacity: 20,146
- Current stadium status: New/Looking for move.

The New Den, as it was initially known to distinguish it from its predecessor, was the first new all-seater stadium in England to be completed after the Taylor Report on the Hillsborough disaster of 1989. It was designed with effective crowd management in mind (particularly given Millwall's crowd problems at The Old Den), with the escape routes being short and direct. After chairman Reg Burr decided that it would not be viable to redevelop The Old Den as an all-seater stadium, he announced in 1990 that the club would relocate to a new stadium in the Senegal Fields area in south Bermondsey. Originally, it was planned to have a seating capacity of between 25,000 and 30,000, however, the club opted to wait so the capacity was kept to just over 20,000.

Millwall played their final game at The Old Den on 8 May 1993 after 83 years and then moved to the new stadium a quarter-of-a-mile away from Cold Blow Lane. The £16 million New Den was opened by John Smith, the leader of the Labour Party and of the Opposition at the time, on 4 August 1993 prior to a prestigious friendly against Sporting Portugal, which Sporting won 2–1. The Den was the first new stadium constructed for a professional football team in London since 1937.

In September 2016 Lewisham Council approved a compulsory purchase order of land surrounding The Den rented by Millwall, as part of a major redevelopment of the "New Bermondsey" area. The plans are controversial because the developer, Renewal, is controlled by offshore companies with unclear ownership, and is seen by the club and local community to be profiteering by demolishing existing homes and businesses as well as Millwall's car-park & the highly acclaimed and well recognised Millwall Community Trust – to build up to 2,400 new private homes, with no council housing and less than 15% of 'affordable housing'. Millwall had submitted their own plans for regeneration centred around the football club itself, but the council voted in favour of Renewal's plans.

In December 2016 Private Eye reported how Renewal had been founded by a former Lewisham Council leader and senior officer, suggesting potential bias, and that the decision to approve Renewal's plans may have been made as long ago as 2013 despite the fact that no due diligence had been able to be carried out by PricewaterhouseCoopers due to "poor" and "limited" access to information and management at Renewal, which is registered in the Isle of Man.

In the face of mounting community opposition and media scrutiny, the Council said in January 2017 it will not proceed with the CPO. However, it was later reported to be taking legal advice regarding other avenues of securing the CPO, and Council cabinet members will decide how to proceed after a "review". Private Eye reported that Millwall are continuing to explore relocation options in Kent.

=== Norwich City ===
- Stadium: Carrow Road
- Capacity: 27,359
- Current stadium status: Reconstructed.

Norwich City increased the capacity of Carrow Road to 27,000 over the summer of 2010, nearly 20 years after the conversion to an all-seater stadium had given it a capacity of more than 21,000. There are plans to further expand Carrow Road by around 8,000 either by the redevelopment of the Geoffrey Watling City Stand or by adding a second tier to the Jarrold Stand, taking the capacity to around 35,000 seats. The initial conversion to an all-seater capacity in the early 1990s saw the stadium have more than 21,000 seats. The club confirmed in September 2012 that the feasibility of a 7,000-seat development has been backed by the University of East Anglia, based on factors such as "population growth, and real numbers, such as socio-economic data, and not instinct or intuition." The likely cost has been estimated at £20m, but that "Currently, every spare penny is reinvested in the first team squad and this is something that the board wishes to continue in the short term."

The building of a Holiday Inn franchise in one corner of the ground, has somewhat diminished possibilities for the future enlargement of Carrow Road. However, the club is looking at options to build a small stand in front of the hotel in the short-term.

=== Preston North End ===
- Stadium: Deepdale
- Capacity: 23,404
- Current stadium status: Reconstructed.

Preston North End completed its Invincibles Stand in 2008. Deepdale's capacity is 24,000. The quadrants could possibly be linked to create a larger bowl configuration of 30,000.

=== Queens Park Rangers ===
- Stadium: Loftus Road
- Capacity: 18,439
- Current stadium status: Reconstructed.

Queens Park Rangers have long harboured ambitions of playing in a larger stadium, with relocation first being considered in the 1990s, after they were founder members of the Premier League, although originally the redevelopment option was taken, with Loftus Road being converted into an all-seater stadium with its capacity below 20,000. This will either be done by expanding their existing Loftus Road ground from its current 19,000 all-seater capacity or by locating to a new stadium elsewhere in West London, with a ground share in White City with Fulham commonly mentioned. QPR achieved promotion to the Premier League in 2011, and owner Tony Fernandes announced in November 2011 that the club were looking for sites in west London to build a new stadium, with a capacity around 40,000. The planned stadium is called New Queens Park.

=== Reading ===
- Stadium: Madejski Stadium
- Capacity: 24,161
- Current stadium status: New.

Reading announced plans for the expansion of the Madejski Stadium. The proposal involves increasing the stadium to 38,000 seats by expanding all stands except the West Stand, and rebuilding the roof. These plans were dependent on Reading staying in the Premiership.; following relegation in 2008, the plans are uncertain. But since Reading were promoted back to the Premier League in 2012 after winning the Championship the plans look to be on as new owner Anton Zingarevich said he would extend the stadium if Reading stay in the Premier League after their first season back. A new railway station Reading Green Park was opening near to the ground, but was later cancelled.

The Madejski Stadium was opened in 1998, having first been proposed in 1994 as Reading climbed up the league and construction of an all-seater stadium was necessary. Elm Park was deemed unsuitable for renovation due to its confined location and the ambitions of chairman John Madejski to establish Reading in the top flight (although promotion was not achieved until 2006), so the decision to build a new stadium was made.

=== Rotherham United ===
- Stadium: ASSEAL New York Stadium
- Capacity: 12,021
- Current stadium status: New.

In 2008 Rotherham United expressed dissatisfaction with their Millmoor home and began to look into the construction of a new stadium in the town. At the start of the 2008–09 season Rotherham United temporarily moved to the Don Valley Stadium in Sheffield due to ownership disputes over Millmoor. The Football League told the club that they must return to Rotherham by 2012 which they have done.

The club moved to the 12,000-capacity New York Stadium, which opened in July 2012.

The New York Stadium is expandable to 20,000 seats.

=== Sheffield United ===
- Stadium: Bramall Lane
- Capacity: 32,125
- Current stadium status: Reconstructed.

Sheffield United announced in 2009 plans to redevelop the Kop Stand, extending it backwards to create an additional 3,215 seats, alongside adding an additional tier to the South Stand. Planned for when the club were promoted back to the Premier League, these would also include significant upgrades to the concourse. While these are yet to be completed, the permission to build was secured in 2009, and the plans were most recently resubmitted for approval in 2017. The developments were planned to be built through two phases, with the Kop first, taking capacity up to 37,000, followed by the South Stand. The additional tier for the South Stand would potentially provide 5,400 seats.

Bramall Lane became all-seater in the mid-1990s after completion of two new stands and the refurbishment of two existing stands. The most recent addition to the stadium is the Westfield Corner, filling in the gap between the South and Bramall Lane stands, which was completed in summer 2006.

=== Southampton ===
- Stadium: St Mary's Stadium
- Capacity: 32,384
- Current stadium status: New.

Southampton left The Dell for a new ground, St Mary's Stadium, in 2001. The stadium has a capacity of 32,505 and is currently the largest football stadium in the South of England (excluding London). Relocation had been in the pipeline since the 1980s, although Southampton had converted The Dell into an all-seater stadium in the early 1990s as a temporary measure, leaving it with a capacity of less than 16,000.

=== Stoke City ===
- Stadium: Bet365 Stadium
- Capacity: 30,089
- Current stadium status: New.

Stoke City have played at the venue now known as bet365 Stadium since 1997, replacing Victoria Ground as their home stadium. Construction of the stadium cost £14.7million and construction works took about 10 months to complete. The bet365 Stadium opened with a capacity of 27,740 spectators, which was reduced from 28,384 due to segregation between the home and away fans.

In 2009, the club unveiled plans to expand the stadium by filling in one or two of the stadium's open corners. This would add around 3,000 seats, taking the total capacity of the stadium to over 30,000. Filling in one corner would cost approximately £3 million. In November 2009, chairman Peter Coates said that the club would make a decision to expand the stadium capacity at the end of the season and was dependent on the club's Premier League survival. These plans were revived in 2010 and 2012, but the club decided not to expand on both occasions.

Finally in April 2016, the club announced that work to fill in the south-east corner would begin the following January. Construction of the new corner commenced in January 2017 and was completed in time for the start of the 2017–18 season. This added around 1,800 seats and took the stadium's capacity to just over 30,000.

=== Swansea City ===
- Stadium: Liberty Stadium
- Capacity: 21,088
- Current stadium status: New.

Swansea City moved to the purpose-built 20,520 all-seater stadium Liberty Stadium in 2005, several years after relocation was first planned. This replaced Vetch Field which had been their home since they were founded and was unsuitable for expansion, and would have had a low all-seater capacity, although relocation plans were first formulated at a time when Swansea were in the league's fourth tier.

The club's current stadium is designed to allow expansion to over 40,000 seats. Construction commenced in the autumn of 2003 with the opening game at the stadium being a friendly between Swansea and Fulham on 23 July 2005.

In April 2013, with a third season in the Premier League being secured, they submitted plans to increase the stadium capacity to 33,000, an increase of around 11,000.

=== Sunderland ===
- Stadium: Stadium of Light
- Capacity: 48,707
- Current stadium status: New.

Sunderland's Stadium of Light is designed to allow expansion to 64,000 seats. In 2003 the club received planning permission to add another 7,200 seats to the South Stand which would have taken capacity to 56,000 but the plans were put on hold due to Sunderland's relegation. In 2007 chairman Niall Quinn said the club had no current plans to increase capacity.

The Stadium of Light was one of the first new stadiums to be built during the modern era, opening in 1997 as replacement for 99-year-old Roker Park, with then chairman Bob Murray having decided in the early 1990s that a new stadium was the best option as Roker Park was unsuitable for converting into an all-seater stadium as its confined location would have given a capacity much lower than the club would have wanted. The land on which the Stadium of Light would eventually be built was identified as the site for a new stadium by 1995, with the plan for a 34,000-seat stadium being altered to allow for 42,000-seat capacity after promotion to the Premier League was achieved the following year. It initially had more than 42,000 seats but this was taken to more than 48,000 in 2001. The original plan for a new stadium next to the Nissan car factory was abandoned following objections by the carmaker.

=== Watford ===
- Stadium: Vicarage Road
- Capacity: 22,200
- Current stadium status: Reconstructed.

Watford play their home games at the 20,877 seater Vicarage Road Stadium after the new 3,400 East Stand, known as the Sir Elton John stand, was completed.

In June 2015, the club announced that the staircases of the Sir Elton John stand would be removed and replaced with 700 seats. The club announced that the North East corner would be transformed and 400 seats added to it, thus taking the total capacity to 22,000

=== West Bromwich Albion ===
- Stadium: The Hawthorns
- Capacity: 26,850
- Current stadium status: Reconstructed.

Chairman Jeremy Peace announced at the end of the 2010–11 season plans to increase the capacity of the Hawthorns to 30,000 over 3 years. It is not yet clear how this will be achieved; however, it could mean rebuilding the Halfords Lane End or rebuilding the East Stand corners. The current capacity of just under 27,000 was first reached in 1994, when The Hawthorns became all-seater.

=== Wigan Athletic ===
- Stadium: DW Stadium
- Capacity: 25,113
- Current stadium status: New.

=== West Ham United ===
- Stadium: London Stadium
- Capacity: 60,000
- Current stadium status: New.

West Ham United shelved plans for a new stadium in east London at a Parcelforce depot adjacent to West Ham tube station following their chairman's bankruptcy in the Icelandic financial crisis. In October 2010 the club formally registered an interest in conjunction with Newham Borough Council in taking over the nearby 2012 Olympic Stadium. The plan involved a 60,000-capacity stadium and the retention of the running track. A converted Olympic stadium would be part of the 2018 World Cup bid. On 12 November 2010 the Olympic Park Legacy Company (OPLC) announced that West Ham and Tottenham Hotspur were the two preferred bidders to take over the Olympic stadium after the 2012 Olympics.

The OPLC announced on 11 February 2011 that West Ham had been selected as the preferred bidder for the Olympic Stadium. The decision was subsequently ratified by Government departments and the Mayor of London. However, following a legal challenge by Tottenham Hotspur and Leyton Orient over the operation of the bidding process the Olympic Park Legacy Company decided in October 2011 to nullify the first bid process, change the legacy handover arrangements, and launch a new bidding process to look for consortiums to lease the stadium. In March 2012 West Ham and Newham Council submitted a bid under the revamped process.

Upton Park had been all-seater since the mid-1990s, the most recent development being the construction of the Dr Martens Stand in the 2000–01 season which gave the club a 35,000 capacity, up from the 26,000 capacity reached in the mid-1990s when Upton Park first became all-seater.

At the start of the 2016–17 season, West Ham left Upton Park and moved into the Olympic Stadium (Renamed The London Stadium), which now has a revised capacity of 60,000, and is designed with retractable seating so the athletics track can still be used.

=== Wolverhampton Wanderers ===
- Stadium: Molineux
- Capacity: 32,050
- Current stadium status: Reconstructed.

Plans were announced in May 2010 to expand the capacity of Molineux by the 2014–15 season from 29,303 to 36,000, with work beginning at the end of the 2010–11 season on the replacement of the Stan Cullis Stand. The new Stan Cullis Stand was completed at the end of the 2011–12 season, raising the stadium's capacity to approximately 31,700. In January 2012 the club announced that the redevelopment of the Steve Bull Stand, which had been set to begin in 2012, had been postponed. The Jack Harris Stand and Billy Wright Stand will also remain unchanged until the club indicates otherwise.

Two of the stadium's four current stands were built in the early 1990s. The original Stan Cullis Stand was also built at this juncture (replacing the old North Bank Stand terraces), but was replaced itself in 2011–12 after just two decades use. The Steve Bull Stand, currently the oldest part of the stadium, was built in 1979. With the completion of three new stands in 1993, in addition to the one opened just fourteen years earlier, Molineux was at the time one of the largest club stadiums in England, but has since been eclipsed by many other clubs who have relocated to new stadiums or expanded their existing ones.

== League One ==
=== Accrington Stanley ===
- Stadium: Wham Stadium
- Capacity: 5,450
- Current stadium status: Reconstructed.

=== Birmingham City ===
- Stadium: St Andrew's Trillion Trophy Stadium
- Capacity: 30,016
- Current stadium status: Reconstructed.

=== Barnsley ===
- Stadium: Oakwell
- Capacity: 23,287
- Current stadium status: Reconstructed.

Barnsley have announced that they are to demolish the old West Stand at Oakwell and replace it with a new 9,000-seater stand similar to the current East Stand . Oakwell Stadium currently holds 23,000 all-seated spectators and has done so since the mid-1990s. The plans for the reconstruction of the West Stand were first announced in the late 1990s. The stadium has a lot of clear land surrounding it making possible expansion to 40,000 or more; however, as Oakwell is rarely full to capacity, the club will continue to maintain the old West Stand for the foreseeable future

=== Bolton Wanderers ===
- Stadium: University of Bolton Stadium
- Capacity:28,723
- Current stadium status: New.

Bolton Wanderers moved into their new University of Bolton Stadium in 1997, having previously played at Burnden Park since 1895. The University of Bolton Stadium has an all-seated capacity of 28,723. The plans for relocation were formulated in the early 1990s, when the club was still in the third tier of the English league but had ambitions of reaching the top flight (achieved in 1995). Burnden Park was an antiquated structure that would have been unsuitable for modernisation, especially as a section of terracing had been sold off in the mid-1980s to make way for a supermarket, and so the decision was made to build a new stadium elsewhere.

=== Bristol Rovers ===
- Stadium: Memorial Stadium
- Capacity: 12,296
- Current stadium status: Reconstructed.

Bristol Rovers had gained planning permission to move into a purpose-built 21,700 all seater stadium at the University of the West of England's Frenchay campus, on the outskirts of Bristol. UWE Stadium would have replaced the club's current Memorial Stadium home which was to have been demolished and sold to Sainsbury's who had planning permission to build a new store on the site. The sale of the Memorial Stadium to Sainsbury's would have partly funded the UWE Stadium project. Following numerous delays (including a Judicial Review launched by local members of the Green Party) it emerged Sainsbury's were attempting to terminate their contract to buy the site. Sainsbury's eventually won a high court case with Rovers pull out of the contract, meaning Rovers would not receive the funding to build the new stadium.

The club were later bought by Jordanian Al-Qadi family with new president, Wael al-Qadi saying a new stadium is a "key requirement" for the new owners.

This turned out not to be the case, as in February 2018 Wael Al-Qadi said the club's plan was now to redevelop the Memorial Stadium stand-by-stand, but then in July 2018 new CEO Martyn Starnes confirmed the club would only be adding one extra temporary tented stand during the 2018/19 season.

=== Burton Albion ===
- Stadium: Pirelli Stadium
- Capacity: 6,912
- Current stadium status: Reconstructed.

=== Cambridge United ===
- Stadium: Abbey Stadium
- Capacity: 8,127
- Current stadium status: Reconstructed.

Cambridge United had been investigating the possibility of improving their Abbey Stadium home, but have abandoned redeveloping the stadium, and are instead proposing a move to a 10,000-capacity stadium and sporting village in one of two new sites. The first proposed site is named NIAB2 – located on land between Huntingdon Road and Histon Road – while the second and favoured option is located south of the city in Trumpington.

=== Charlton Athletic ===
- Stadium: The Valley
- Capacity: 27,111
- Current stadium status: Reconstructed.

Charlton have planning permission from Greenwich Council to add a second tier to the East Stand at The Valley, increasing capacity to 31,000, up from a capacity of more than 26,000 which was reached in December 2001. Potential future developments to the Jimmy Seed Stand could see this raised to 40,000, but this is unlikely to happen unless the club is promoted back to the Premier League or comes under new ownership.

=== Cheltenham Town ===
- Stadium: Whaddon Road
- Capacity: 7,066
- Current stadium status: Reconstructed.

In 2008, plans to build a new 10,000-seater stadium at Cheltenham Racecourse were mooted. In September 2011 things were said by Edward Gillespie to be "moving forward". However, by December these plans had been shelved.

In March 2012 the club announced that they plan to redevelop their existing Whaddon Road stadium by building a new 3,000-capacity stand.

=== Derby County ===
- Stadium: Pride Park
- Capacity: 33,597
- Current stadium status: New.

In April 2007, Derby County released details of a proposed £20m development around their Pride Park Stadium which would create about 250 jobs. The Pride Plaza project would include a 165-bed hotel, bars, restaurants and office space. On 9 November 2007 Derby City Council agreed to let the plans go ahead.

Additionally the club has announced plans to expand the capacity up from 33,500 to 44,000, with the work due to take place during the 2007–08 close season, provided the club avoided relegation. The plans include adding rows of seats to the north, south and east stands. If completed, this would allow the club to break its current club record home attendance, Pride Park was opened in 1997 when Derby left the Baseball Ground, as one of the first clubs to relocate to a new stadium to comply with the Taylor Report. The new stadium was opened just 18 months after the decision to relocate was made public; the previous plan had been for the Baseball Ground to be rebuilt with a 26,000-seat capacity. However, the club failed to maintain its top-flight status and when, in January 2008, was sold into new American ownership, in the form of General Sports and Entertainment both the Plaza plan and the Ground expansion initiatives were scrapped.

On 3 October 2011, Derby County announced that they had submitted plans to Derby City Council for a £7 million development of land outside the stadium, which the club named "The Plaza @ Pride Park".

These plans include five cafes/restaurants, two convenience stores and 2,000 square metres of office space. These plans have been scaled down from the planned £20 million development proposed in 2007. Derby County CEO Tom Glick, said that these plans would help the club deal with the new Financial Fair Play regulations which will be introduced in the Football League from 2012, as revenue from the Plaza will be reinvested back into the club.

This planned development also coincides with a plan from the City Council to build a multi-use sports arena on the same site as the proposed Plaza.

On 12 January 2012, Derby City Council's Planning Control Committee gave planning permission for the development. Derby County Chief Executive Tom Glick stated the club had moved the next stage of the development, finding a development company to build the plaza.

=== Exeter City ===
- Stadium: St James Park (Exeter)
- Capacity: 8,541
- Current stadium status: Reconstructed.

=== Fleetwood Town ===
- Stadium: Highbury Stadium (Fleetwood)
- Capacity: 5,327
- Current stadium status: Reconstructed.

Fleetwood Town have invested heavily in Highbury Stadium recently following many promotions and increased attendances in recent years. In February 2007 the new Percy Ronson Stand was opened. A £500,000-plus development the stand is all terracing, and holds 1,243. In July 2007, further plans for the stadium development were announced which included three new stands. The plans were finalized in December 2007 and in March 2008, planning permission was given for the first phase, construction of the north and west terraces. Construction began in May 2008, and was completed for the start of the 2008–09 season. In May 2010, a couple of days before Fleetwood's playoff final at the stadium work began on the new west stand. The stadium was completed in spring 2011 and opened on 16 April 2011 for Fleetwood's game against Altrincham F.C., which they won 3–1. The stadium's capacity is now 5,500; it is the 118th largest stadium by capacity in England and the second smallest in EFL League One.

=== Forest Green Rovers ===
- Stadium: The New Lawn
- Capacity: 5,147
- Current stadium status: New.

=== Leicester City ===
- Stadium: King Power Stadium
- Capacity: 32,261
- Current stadium status: New.

Leicester have announced plans to extend the King Power Stadium to 42,000 seats. The owners announced in June 2015 that they had begun the application for permission to build.

The club have played at their 32,500-seat stadium since relocating from nearby Filbert Street in 2002. They had spent 111 years at Filbert Street and converted it into an all-seater format in 1993 with the construction of one new stand and the refurbishment of the three others, but a run of success in the top flight prompted demand for tickets vastly outstripping supply, and the stadium's confined location made expansion difficult, so by 1998 the decision was made to build a new stadium. However, the relocation to a new stadium took place in the same year as relegation from the Premier League, putting a huge strain on the club's finances and leading to a spell in administration as debts reached more than £30 million.

=== Lincoln City ===
- Stadium: Sincil Bank
- Capacity: 10,120
- Current stadium status: Reconstructed.

=== Milton Keynes Dons ===
- Stadium: Stadium MK
- Capacity: 30,500
- Current stadium status: New.

Milton Keynes Dons opened their Stadium MK home in 2007. The original opening capacity was 22,000. Plans exist to increase the capacity to between 46,000 and 55,000 seats, but with England's failure to win the bidding for the 2018 FIFA World Cup any improvements to increase the stadium's attendance would be dependent on promotion to the Premier League at least. In November 2011, MK Dons announced that they would expand Stadium MK to 32,000 for the 2012–13 season. However, it was only at the end of the season that development began on the upper-tier seating.

=== Morecambe ===
- Stadium: Globe Arena
- Capacity: 6,476
- Current stadium status: New.

Morecambe moved from its previous ground at Christie Park to The Globe Arena at the start of the 2010–11 season. The ground has a capacity of 6000, comprising 2000 seats and 4000 standing spaces.

=== Oxford United ===
- Stadium: Kassam Stadium
- Capacity: 12,500
- Current stadium status: New.

Oxford United have plans to purchase the Kassam Stadium and to build a fourth side to it. Now that they have regained Football League status and attendances rise to sufficiently justify it, this is increasingly likely. The stadium was first planned in 1995 and construction began in 1997, but financial difficulties saw construction suspended shortly after it begin, and the relocation from the dilapidated Manor Ground was not completed until 2001. By then, two relegations in three seasons had dragged the club from Division One to Division Three, coinciding with a fall in attendances, and this was the reason for the stadium initially only having three sides incorporating 12,500 seats. The planned fourth stand would take the capacity to around 16,000.

=== Peterborough United ===
- Stadium: Weston Homes Stadium
- Capacity: 15,314
- Current stadium status: Reconstructed.

Peterborough United have played at London Road since 1934, although due to its age and the fact that it has terracing the club are considering options to move. A number of alternative sites have been put forward in Peterborough council's January 2009 Area Action Plan for the City Centre Area. This document's consultation period has now closed and thus the publication of the final AAP is awaited for more information on preferred sites for a new stadium.

At the end of October during the 2012–13 season, demolition of the away terrace (Moyes End) will commence. This making way for a new all seater stand, but leaving visiting supporters with only 3–4 thousand seats for the remainder of the 2012–13 season.

=== Portsmouth ===
- Stadium: Fratton Park
- Capacity: 20,620
- Current stadium status: Reconstructed – redeveloping

Portsmouth had the smallest stadium in the Premier League during the 2007–08 season. The board planned to remedy this by rebuilding Fratton Park turning the pitch round 90 degrees. This was then abandoned in favour of a 35,000 'Pompey Village' plan, and then superseded by the ambitious proposal ship-like Portsmouth Dockland Stadium which was planned to hold 36,000 seated spectators, hoping to have ready in 2011. However, it has been revealed that Portsmouth F.C. are now preparing to build a 36,000-seater stadium at Horsea Island

Portsmouth have been considering relocation since the early 1990s, but had upgraded their stadium to an all-seater capacity as a short-term measure. In May 2009 all stadium relocation plans were put on hold. The club are looking to expand the current Fratton Park stadium by going back to its original plan of turning it around and increasing capacity to 30,000. However, administration and further relegation means Fratton Park will remain in its same state until the club clear the balance sheet. In January 2022, redevelopment started on The North Stand Lower including Blocks A-E until May 2022 adding 12 wheelchair spaces. Reconstruction on blocks F-K will start from May 2022 adding an additional 600 seats.

=== Port Vale ===
- Stadium: Vale Park
- Capacity: 20,552
- Current stadium status: Reconstructed.

Port Vale's Vale Park saw the Lorne Street stand demolished in 1998, and work began on a £3 million all-seater replacement. However, with the overall capacity of 19,052 already more than adequate, the stand remained uncompleted. Two periods in administration in 2002 and again in 2012, made it extremely difficult to fund completion but new owner and chairman, Carol Shanahan completed the work in 2021.

=== Plymouth Argyle ===
- Stadium: Home Park
- Capacity: 16,388
- Current stadium status: Reconstructed; further improvements on hold.

Home Park has seen large-scale changes to the ground in recent years. The first stage of reconstruction at the ground took place in 2001, with the replacement of 3 stands with an all-seater horseshoe-shaped stand. Following the construction, the club then planned to rebuild the main grandstand. This initially did not materialize, and following the financial crisis at the club in 2010 and 2011, future stadium plans were put on hold.

After Plymouth Argyle went into administration, the club was taken over by local business owner James Brent, and fresh plans for a new Mayflower Grandstand were submitted to Plymouth City Council. The plans included the stand itself, as well as a new 1500-seat-capacity ice rink, 10-screen cinema and a hotel that would provide funds for the club. The plans received planning permission on 15 August 2013, with Brent suggesting that development could begin immediately. The old grandstand was planned to be demolished in late October 2013, but was put on hold after rival plans for similar leisure facilities at Bretonside were approved. In September 2016, Brent told the Plymouth Herald that he hoped a 'redeveloped grandstand' would be completed in time for the 400th anniversary of the Mayflower sailing in 2020 when the city of Plymouth will host significant celebrations.

=== Sheffield Wednesday ===
- Stadium: Hillsborough
- Capacity: 39,732
- Current stadium status: Reconstructed.

Sheffield Wednesday announced in the summer of 2009 plans for a £22m upgrade of the stadium and an increase in capacity to 44,825 with no viewing restrictions. Should this happen, it will bring the stadium up to FIFA standards for hosting World Cup matches.

To remove any viewing restrictions the current pillars that support the roof of the Kop and West Stand will be removed. An 'iconic' roof structure will support the Kop's roof while the West Stand will have a completely new roof. The North West Terrace will get a roof and a corner of seating will be added between the Kop and North Stand with a roof. The current layout of tiers on the West Stand will be radically changed and a new tier of seats will be added as well as a 'new specific learning zone' between the new upper tier and present upper tier. The mega-store and gymnasium behind the North Stand will be demolished and the North Stand will be expanded to create the 'biggest classroom in Europe' as well as 'enterprise zones' and 17 boxes. The South Stand floor plan and stadium surroundings will be improved to comply with FIFA requirements. Stadium parking and access will be improved as will the exterior appearance of all stands.

Hillsborough became all-seated for the start of the 1993–94 season when the Kop and North West Corner were both seated. The Leppings Lane terrace was seated for the start of the 1991–92 season – just over two years since the disaster which occurred on it.

=== Shrewsbury Town ===
- Stadium: New Meadow
- Capacity: 9,875
- Current stadium status: New.

Shrewsbury Town moved to the New Meadow in summer 2007. In November 2007 the club announced that the New Meadow would be expanded by filling in the corners between the Roland Wycherley Stand, South Stand and West Stand, bringing the overall capacity up to 12,500. Work was hoped to commence summer 2008, however, plans were put on hold to concentrate on events on field.

=== Wycombe Wanderers ===
- Stadium: Adams Park
- Capacity: 9,558
- Current stadium status: New.

In 2007 it was announced that Wycombe Wanderers in partnership with London Wasps were looking to build a new 20,000-capacity ground in High Wycombe to replace the current Adams Park (only built in 1990 to replace Loakes Park) where the capacity is capped, and further expansion is not possible. The plans were dropped in 2011, and Wasps left the ground in 2014.

== League Two ==
=== AFC Wimbledon ===
- Stadium: Plough Lane
- Capacity: 9,300
- Current stadium status: New.

On their foundation in 2002, AFC Wimbledon moved in with Kingstonian at Kingsmeadow, purchasing the ground. They had plans to relocate the club to the London Borough of Merton, the traditional home of Wimbledon F.C., since the formation of the club. This speculation eventually proved true; AFC Wimbledon received final approval to build a new ground there in September 2016.

Demolition of the old Wimbledon Greyhound Stadium began on 16 March 2019, with one main stand and three temporary stands. The new Plough Lane was opened in October 2020, with the first Dons match being a 2–2 draw against Doncaster Rovers behind closed doors. There are plans to expand Plough Lane to 20,000 capacity in the long-term future.

=== Barrow ===
- Stadium: Progression Solicitors Stadium
- Capacity: 5,045
- Current stadium status: Reconstructed.

Barrow are investigating building a new stadium in the Docklands section of the town, which would be shared with the Barrow Raiders rugby league side.

=== Bradford City ===
- Stadium: Valley Parade
- Capacity: 25,136
- Current stadium status: Reconstructed.

=== Carlisle United ===
- Stadium: Brunton Park
- Capacity: 18,202
- Current stadium status: Reconstructed.

=== Chesterfield ===
- Current stadium status: New.

Chesterfield were looking to move out of their dated Saltergate ground for several years in other locations around the town before planning permission was granted at the former Dema glassworks in July 2008. The new ground opened in 2010 and was called, for sponsorship reasons, the b2net Stadium. In 2012 after the purchase of b2net by Swedish company Proact the stadium name changed to its current name, the Proact Stadium. The ground has a capacity of 10,504 all seated and was built at a cost of £13,000,000. The stadium was designed to be easily expanded in the future.

=== Colchester United ===
- Stadium: Colchester Community Stadium
- Capacity: 10,105
- Current stadium status: New.

Colchester United took possession of a new stadium, funded by the local council, in July 2008. The Colchester Community Stadium cost £16 million to build and has a capacity of 10,000 seats. There is potential for future expansion to 18,000.

=== Crawley Town ===
- Stadium: The People's Pension Stadium
- Capacity: 6,134
- Current stadium status: Reconstructed.

Crawley Town expanded Broadfield Stadium in 2012 by rebuilding the East Stand, increasing capacity at the stadium by 2,151 and constructing new turnstile blocks, toilets and concession areas as well as improved floodlighting. and Crawley Town Football Club also have new plans to construct a bigger and better stadium with a larger capacity in the nearby area known as Bewbush within the town.

=== Crewe Alexandra ===
- Stadium: The Alexandra Stadium
- Capacity: 10,153
- Current stadium status: Reconstructed.

Crewe Alexandra are hoping to expand their stadium, Alexandra Stadium to 16,700. However, Crewe are looking for benefactors to donate funding for the project. With this money, the 3 smaller stands will all have 2 tiers, each holding another 2,000–2,500 spectators each. Also, a new interactive score board will be placed at the stadium above the Wulvern Housing stand.

=== Doncaster Rovers ===
- Stadium: Keepmoat Stadium
- Capacity: 15,231
- Current stadium status: New.

In December 2006 the Keepmoat Stadium in Doncaster held its first sporting fixture. even though it did not have its official opening until August 2007 when they played Manchester United in a pre-season friendly.

=== Grimsby Town ===
- Stadium: Blundell Park
- Capacity: 9,027
- Current stadium status: Reconstructed.

Since the mid-1990s the club has been pursuing a move to a new stadium elsewhere in the area. In the late 1990s the club submitted a planning application for a new stadium on the western outskirts of Grimsby at Great Coates, adjacent to the A180 dual carriageway. The provisionally titled Conoco Stadium was to be funded by a partnership with a major retailer and would be built with a capacity of 14,000 that could be expanded up to 21,000 (to meet Premier League requirements) in a matter of weeks by building the entire structure of the stadium but not installing any facilities or seats in the four corners of the stadium until they were required.

The new stadium would have included improved facilities, including a substantial increase in match-day hospitality areas, more corporate boxes, more cafe and bar areas including for away supporters, significantly more toilets, larger and more versatile player dressing rooms, wider seats with more legroom, a hard-wearing hybrid pitch capable of withstanding multiple rugby and football matches being played on it every week and facilities that could be used throughout the year for corporate events.

The aim was to open the new stadium for the start of the 2001/2002 season. After considerable opposition to the plans from local residents delayed the project, the new stadium received planning permission from North East Lincolnshire Council in November 2000. The Government Office for Yorkshire and the Humber approved the plan in February 2002, Conoco agreed naming rights to the stadium in April 2002 and the revised opening date was set for the start of the 2003/2004 season. At the end of 2002 retailers Woolworths and B&Q pulled out of the scheme and opening was set back again to the 2005/2006 season. After planning permission was refused in 2003 due to issues with the release of the land the club resubmitted a planning application in 2006 along the same lines as the earlier proposal that was awarded permission by the council in 2007. Due to the economic crisis of 2008 and struggling performances on the pitch the stadium's planning permission expired in 2010 and the Great Coates proposal was no longer considered viable.

After committing to seeking a new site for a new stadium in 2011 the club actively pursued a range of potential stadium sites in an around Grimsby. After a long feasibility study the momentum was clearly behind a site off Peaks Parkway two miles South of Grimsby. The club submitted a planning application for a less ambitious 14,000 capacity stadium along with an adjoining retail development in November 2016. Opponents to the Peaks Parkway scheme argued that the use of a greenfield site over various brownfield alternatives and the proximity of the stadium to a cemetery made it unsuitable and the council took the site off the table in October 2018.

In October 2018 the council indicated a preference for Freeman Street and the East Marsh to be used as a new location for a new stadium as part of a major regeneration project of this part of the town. Advantages of this site include extensive regeneration of the area and the use of a brownfield site but disadvantages include parking and transport as the new stadium would be within the town itself.

Talk of using Grimsby Fish Dock as a site for a new stadium has increased since July 2019. Advantages of this site are the use of the underused but iconic docks which could be directly incorporated into the design and ample scope for parking and transport links. Disadvantages include the potential cost of filling in the docks and land decontamination. The 2019 General Election produced a Conservative victory in the Great Grimsby Constituency and this may have a significant effect on the stadium plans. As Conservative policy is to support the creation of Free Ports after leaving the European Union there is an opportunity for the town to attract more inward investment and for the ports to grow. This would make the fish docks site less desirable as it could limit the regeneration of the fishing industry and the regeneration opportunities of the Freeman Street site more attractive to government as it considers funding.

At the end of December 2019 the leader of the council stated that regeneration of the Freeman Street area with a new stadium on it was "top of his wish list for 2020".

=== Gillingham ===
- Stadium: Priestfield
- Capacity: 11,582
- Current stadium status: Reconstructed.

Priestfield Stadium has been entirely rebuilt since 1997, but former Gillingham chairman Paul Scally at the time made it clear of his intention to move to a new stadium, despite Gillingham dropping from the Championship to League Two since 2005. Although the club have since bounced back to League One, and subsequently being relegated back into League Two the following season, the chairman has announced plans for a new stadium are on hold due to the current financial climate. In 2012 the club announced plans to build a 12,000–24,000-seater stadium at the Mill Hill site off of Yokusuka Way. Also on the 40-acre complex would be a supermarket, a hotel, a tennis academy, fast food restaurants, a nursery and a fitness centre.

=== Harrogate Town ===
- Stadium: Envirovent Stadium
- Capacity: 5,000
- Current stadium status: Reconstructed.

=== Hartlepool United ===
- Stadium: Victoria Park
- Capacity: 7,856
- Current stadium status: Reconstructed.

=== Leyton Orient ===
- Stadium: The Breyer Group Stadium
- Capacity: 9,271
- Current stadium status: Reconstructed.

=== Mansfield Town ===
- Stadium: One Call Stadium
- Capacity: 9,186
- Current stadium status: Reconstructed.

=== Newport County ===
- Stadium: Rodney Parade
- Capacity: 8,700
- Current stadium status: Reconstructed.

=== Northampton Town ===
- Stadium: Sixfields
- Capacity: 7,798
- Current stadium status: New.

=== Rochdale ===
- Stadium: The Crown Oil Arena
- Capacity: 10,249
- Current stadium status: Reconstructed.

=== Salford City ===
- Stadium: The Peninsula Stadium
- Capacity: 5,106
- Current stadium status: Reconstructed.

=== Stockport County ===
- Current stadium status: Reconstructed.

Edgeley Park has been under discussion for redevelopment of the away end, called the Railway End, as they planned to add an extra tier and roof to the stand. However, due to land behind the stadium being owned by the council, who are currently not willing to sell the land, these plans have been put on hold. Another plan was to build the Popular side and add another tier with executive boxes, but all these plans have been put on hold.

The stadium achieved an 11,000-seat capacity in the late 1990s, when the club was playing in Division One. At one stage there were plans for County to relocate to Maine Road once Manchester City vacated it in 2003, but these plans were scrapped and Maine Road has since been demolished.

=== Stevenage ===
- Stadium: Lamex Stadium
- Capacity: 6,722
- Current stadium status: Reconstructed.

=== Sutton United ===
- Current stadium status: Reconstructed.

Sutton United's ground, Gander Green Lane, has a rather distant terrace at the east end, and the club hope to bring the terrace much closer to the goal, along with several other improvements to the clubhouse.

=== Swindon Town ===
- Stadium: County Ground
- Capacity: 15,728
- Current stadium status: Reconstructed.

=== Tranmere Rovers ===
- Stadium: Prenton Park
- Capacity: 16,567
- Current stadium status: Reconstructed.

Tranmere Rovers originally had plans to expand Prenton Park's capacity to 30,000 should the club have reached the Premier League. With this now looking unlikely, the club are looking to replace their ageing Main Stand for a more modern structure.

Tranmere have been linked with a new stadium as part of the £4.5 Billion "Wirral Waters" Scheme, That has recently been given the go ahead. The capacity may be lowered from the current Prenton Park due to dwindling attendances.

=== Walsall ===
- Stadium: The Banks's Stadium
- Capacity: 11,300
- Current stadium status: New.

Walsall F.C. have announced they have gained planning permission to rebuild the William Sharp End, adding an extra 2,300 seats and raising overall capacity at the Bescot Stadium to 13,500.

Bescot Stadium was opened in 1990 to replace nearby Fellows Park, and originally had a capacity of just under 10,000, of which approximately two thirds was seated. The construction of a new all-seater stand on the site of the terraced section took place in 2002.

=== York City ===
- Current stadium status: New.

At one point York City were investigating improving Bootham Crescent, but have now switched their plans to the construction of a new stadium to be shared with the York City Knights rugby club.

== National League ==
=== AFC Fylde ===
- Stadium: Mill Farm
- Capacity: 6,000
- Current stadium status: New.

AFC Fylde moved to Kellamergh Park, in 2006 in order to meet the ground criteria for promotion to the North West Counties Football League. On 19 January 2008 the club announced plans for a further move to yet another new stadium at an unnamed 26-acre (110,000 m^{2}) site.

In 2016, AFC Fylde moved to their newest ground, Mill Farm with 6,000 capacity.

=== Aldershot Town ===
- Stadium: The EBB Stadium
- Capacity: 7,100
- Current stadium status: Reconstructed.

=== Barnet ===
- Stadium: The Hive
- Capacity: 6,500
- Current stadium status: New.

Barnet were forced to move rapidly to their training complex 'The Hive' in 2013. The complex had the shell of a small stadium with two abandoned end terraces behind the main building. Between February and August 2013 the pitch was renovated, terraces restored, 750 seats built into the back of the existing building and a new 2700 capacity stand built along the opposite touchline. Construction re-commenced in November 2015 with the main building (now renamed East Stand) being extended to provide a medical centre, ticket office and enlarge the banqueting facilities. A gradual process is underway to convert the stadium to all seated and enhance facilities at the site with the North terrace replaced by a 1,868 capacity stand in the style of the new West Stand due for completion in September 2016.

The chairman has confirmed that replacement of the South Terrace, extension of the West Stand and an improvement of the current partial roof of the East stand and a New sports hall will be scheduled once the existing work is complete.

=== Boreham Wood ===
- Stadium: Meadow Park
- Capacity: 5,000
- Current stadium status: Reconstructed.

=== Bromley ===
- Current stadium status: Reconstructed.

In April 2017, Bromley announced plans to redevelop the South end of their Hayes Lane stadium. The plans include an all-seater stand with capacity of up to 1,450 incorporating indoor sports facilities for community use. While planning permission has been achieved, work is yet to commence as of May 2018.

=== FC Halifax Town ===
- Current stadium status: Reconstructed.

Halifax Town had at one point been planning further ground improvements to The Shay, increasing the Main Stand to take capacity to over 10,000. Financial difficulties meant that development had to put on hold for the foreseeable future, leaving the Main Stand half-finished.

With the club resurrected as FC Halifax Town in the Northern Premier League First Division (North), the Main Stand was completed in March 2010.

=== Oldham Athletic ===
- Stadium: Boundary Park
- Capacity: 13,513
- Current stadium status: Reconstructed.

Boundary Park has been all-seater stadium since the mid-1990s, though the improvements were very much a task of refurbishment rather than reconstruction. The only reconstruction happened at the Rochdale Road End of the ground where the old traditional open terrace was replaced by a 4,600 capacity all seated stand. The Chadderton Road End on the opposite side of the ground simply had seats bolted onto the terrace, whilst the Main Stand and Broadway Stand had seats added to the lower tiers of the stand.

There were plans in the late 1990s for a move to a new 20,000 all seater stadium on adjoining waste ground, but these were scrapped.

Because of these problems, the club announced in the summer of 2009 that it was considering moving to a new stadium in Failsworth. However, the Charities Commission later turned down the application.

On 28 July 2011 Oldham Metropolitan Borough Council offered the club £5.7 million to help with their redevelopment fund of Boundary Park, which would involve the redevelopment of the Broadway Stand.

Planning approval for the new North Stand was confirmed in April 2013, including a 2,671 capacity stand, a health and fitness suite, supporters' bar and event facilities. Demolition and preparatory work started in the summer of 2013. Construction of the new North Stand is still ongoing, although the seating area in the stand was open for use on 17 October 2015 for the home match against Sheffield United. The new North Stand is significantly taller than the stand that it replaced although the capacity for supporters is roughly the same, bringing the ground capacity up to 13,512. The additional height allows for office space, corporate hospitality, retail opportunities and a gymnasium

=== Maidstone United ===
- Current stadium status: New.

The club that re-formed following the dissolution of the original Maidstone United played at Sittingbourne, while constructing a new stadium at James Whatman Way. The new stadium (named the Gallagher Stadium) opened in July 2012 and has a capacity of 2,500 with 450 seats. In the summer of 2015, the main stand is being expanded and, along with additional upgrades, will increase the capacity to 3,000. The club is also at the forefront of introducing 3G pitches to lower league football. The stadium is used 7 days a week with the pitch standing up well to heavy use by all levels of community football. They are yet to have a game postponed for weather / pitch reasons.

=== Scunthorpe United ===
- Stadium: Glanford Park
- Capacity: 9,088
- Current stadium status: New; looking for move.

Scunthorpe United's Glanford Park was built in 1988. A 6000 housing estate idea was created on the outskirts of Scunthorpe and a 12000 all seater stadium was envisaged for Scunthorpe United to play their home games at. The chairman felt that their Glanford Park was limiting the club and he wanted to have a stadium that could house concerts, conferences and be a 24/7 7 days a week used venue. Planning permission was given by the North Lincolnshire council in mid-2016.

=== Solihull Moors ===
- Current stadium status: Reconstructed.

Solihull Moors have secured a ground share agreement at their Damson Park home with Birmingham & Solihull R.F.C., home to professional rugby union side, the Bees. The clubs have submitted (Nov08) planning applications for facility and ground improvements which will see the Borough of Solihull offered a centre of excellence and a Community Foundation which will benefit its own populace and beyond. Solihull Moors were founded in 2007 by a merger of local sides Moor Green and Solihull Borough.

=== Southend United ===
- Stadium: Roots Hall
- Capacity: 12,392
- Current stadium status: Reconstructed.

Southend United have previously had plans to move out of Roots Hall and build a new stadium on the site of Fossetts Farm in the far north of Southend. It was set to tie in with development plans happening in the local area, all under their owners (Ron Martin) development company. However, in March 2023 the club was put up for sale and on 3 October 2023, an agreement between Ron Martin and a Consortium led by Australian businessman and entrepreneur Justin Rees was made. The full transaction and acquirement of shares was due to take place on 17 November 2023.

Th consortium have clearly stated to the Southend United fanbase and current owner Ron Martin that they would like to disregard the idea of a move to a new 16,000 seater stadium in the Fossets farm area and instead Redevelop their current stadium at Roots Hall. On 2 November 2023, it was announced that there would be a new Club lounge to be built inside the Main Stand (East stand) at Roots Hall.

== National League North ==
=== AFC Telford United ===
- Current stadium status: New.

AFC Telford United play at the New Bucks Head It was originally built for Telford United to play at before they went bankrupt. The stadium is on the same site as the original Bucks Head, which had been home to Telford United and Wellington Town for over a century. The stadium was completed in 2003, and has a capacity of 6,300. It is covered on three out of four sides. The stadium lease and assets are currently held by Telford and Wrekin Council, completed in 2003 and was the 111th largest football stadium in England.

=== Bradford (Park Avenue) ===
- Current stadium status: Reconstructed.

Bradford (Park Avenue) had been planning to leave their current Horsfall Stadium for the redeveloped Grattan Stadium, which would be shared with Bradford Bulls. With this redevelopment being continually delayed, though, Avenue are now planning to build a new 20,000-capacity stadium in South Leeds.

=== Darlington 1883 ===
- Current stadium status: Plans Submitted.

After the demise of Darlington in 2012, fan owned Darlington 1883 was formed, they left the Darlington Arena to groundshare with Bishop Auckland at Heritage Park. Darlington entered into an agreement with Darlington Rugby Club to redevelop Blackwell Meadows and plans were submitted to the local council at the end of 2014.

=== FC United of Manchester ===
- Current stadium status: New.

Since the club's formation in 2005, F.C. United have not had their own home ground. Instead, they share a ground with Bury F.C., using their Gigg Lane ground.

In March 2010, the club announced plans to build their own 5,000-capacity football ground in Newton Heath, the original home of Manchester United. Manchester City Council initially approved, but within a year had backed out from funding the stadium. The council pledged to help FC United build a stadium in a new location with reduced costs, and the alternative site was announced in April 2011 in the Broadhurst Park area of Moston, Manchester. After many delays due to legal challenges by a small number of residents, work finally got underway in November 2013.

=== Gainsborough Trinity ===
In November 2009, Trinity chairman Peter Swann announced that he intends to build a new 4,000-seat stadium for the club. The club was hopeful that the new stadium will be open for the beginning of the 2013–14 season, however, in September 2012, Swann announced that the plans will be cancelled, due to his ill health. The current plan is for Swann to buy the stadium from current owners the Blues Club, and spend £500,000 improving it. As of 27 December 2012, talks are ongoing.

=== Hereford FC ===
- Current stadium status: Reconstructed.

The terraced Blackfriars Street End at Edgar Street was closed in 2009 after failing a safety inspection. The club now plan to build a 1,600 seater stand in its place, bringing capacity up to 7,650. Hereford United were wound up by the High Court in December 2014 after failure to provide assurances that club debts would be paid. A new phoenix club, Hereford F.C. have been set up and will play at Edgar Street.

=== Leamington ===
- Current stadium status: New

Leamington's current home The New Windmill Ground, was opened on the site of a former farmer's field in 2000. Previous to this the club had been without a home and unable to play since 1988 when they were evicted from their previous location The Windmill Ground. When it was opened The New Windmill Ground had few facilities but two new stands and increased terracing, along with better toilets and medical facilities have since been added.

In 2017 plans were approved for a new stadium to replace their current ground, to be located in the Gallow's Hill area of town. The current ground would then be used to house travellers. As of April 2019 work was yet to start.

== National League South ==
=== Bath City ===
- Current stadium status: Reconstructed.

Bath City F.C. had plans to move from Twerton Park to join with Bath Rugby at The Rec which has a capacity of 10,600. There are long-term plans at the club to find a new home.

=== Braintree Town ===
- Current stadium status: Reconstructed.

Braintree Town F.C. unveiled plans for a new 6,000-capacity stadium at Panfield Lane in March 2012 with club chairman Lee Harding indicating they anticipate it being ready in time for the start of the 2016–17 season. In the meantime, the club is redeveloping the Quag End of their existing Cressing Road ground to bring it up to Conference National standards.

=== Gloucester City ===
- Current stadium status: Reconstructed.

Gloucester City are currently groundsharing with Cheltenham Town at the Abbey Business stadium (Whaddon Road) in Cheltenham following the flooding of their Meadow Park stadium in 2007. Gloucester spent one season groundsharing with Forest Green Rovers at The New Lawn in Nailsworth and in Cirencester. The club now look set for a return to their old ground at Meadow Park in Gloucester. Currently scaled down plans are going through the council.

=== Truro City ===
- Current stadium status: Reconstructed.

As part of their strategy to become the first Cornish side to gain League status, Truro City F.C. have plans to build a new Stadium for Cornwall at a new site to the north of the city at Pencoose Farm, Kenwyn which will include a 16,000-all-seater stadium, sports bar, training facilities and a youth academy.

== Other Non-League ==
In February 2010 a Charitable Trust called the Haythornthwaite Sports Foundation unveiled plans for a new Community Sports Complex at Greenlands Farm which will comprise Indoor and outdoor Sports Facilities catering for local junior football, cricket and other sports plus a new home for AFC Fylde with an initial capacity of 1400. Public Consultations took place in February 2010 with further announcements expected in summer 2010.

=== Aylesbury United ===
- Current stadium status: Reconstructed.

Aylesbury United have been ground sharing with Chesham United and currently with Leighton Town since their eviction from Buckingham Road in 2006. There are plans to move into a new 10,000-seat stadium if plans to build a sports village are approved.

=== Cambridge City ===
- Current stadium status: Reconstructed.

The club face a potential eviction from their City Ground home in 2010. Their long-term future regarding a new stadium is unclear, and it is possible they may be forced to share with their cross-city rivals, Cambridge United at the Abbey Stadium or relocate to another settlement on a temporary basis.

=== Grays Athletic ===
- Current stadium status: Homeless.

Grays Athletic had plans to redevelop the New Recreation Ground to facilitate entry into the football league. The ground was sold in 2007 with housing built on the site which left Grays homeless and seeking to build a new stadium [https://www.thurrockgazette.co.uk/sport/1845795.grays-athletic-to-quit-new-rec/] It is proposed they will ground share with another club while the new arena is built. However, it was announced on 12 April 2008 that Grays Athletic plan to move to a new stadium in Aveley, Thurrock.

=== Histon ===
- Current stadium status: Reconstructed.

Histon are rebuilding the Bridge Road End, bringing the seating capacity of the stadium up to 1700 and the overall capacity of their Glassworld Stadium to over 4000.

=== Kettering Town ===
- Current stadium status: Up for sale

Kettering have aspirations to move to a new stadium somewhere in the borough, with problems lying in securing funding and securing the lease on current ground, Rockingham Road. Chairman Imraan Ladak insisted plans were on track, with a site identified and potential funding sourced; however, in 2011 Kettering Town moved to Nene Park, former home of rivals Rushden & Diamonds.

=== Matlock Town ===
- Current stadium status: Reconstructed.

Matlock are in process of rebuilding the North Stand, to bring the stadium capacity up to 2,757, from the previous 2,214 capacity .

=== St Albans City ===
- Current stadium status: Reconstructed.

In 2006 the chairman of the club threatened to move them out of St Albans if the council would not back plans to build a new 10,000-stadium on Green Belt land on the outskirts of St Albans. Little has been of the proposition since, and the current Clarence Park has been given a superficial makeover. In 2013, the club submitted a planning application for a new stadium.

=== St Helens Town ===
- Current stadium status: Proposed.

St Helens Town F.C. currently share Brocstedes Park with Ashton Town F.C., and may return to the town to a stadium to be built as part of the redevelopment of the Ruskin Drive sports complex.

=== Warrington Town ===
- Current stadium status: New.

Warrington Town announced plans to move from Cantilever Park to a new 5,000–6,000 all-seater stadium at the new Omega Development site next to the M62 near Burtonwood.

=== Weymouth ===
- Current stadium status: Reconstructed.

On 27 August 2008, Weymouth F.C. outlined plans to construct a new 6,000 all-seater stadium, hoped to be open by 2012 when the area hosts sailing events during the London Olympics. A large part of the cost would be offset by the sale and redevelopment of the existing Wessex Stadium.

=== Worcester City ===
- Current stadium status: Reconstructed.

Worcester City are planning to move to a new stadium, leaving St George's Lane after more than a century. They have entered into an agreement with developers St Mowden to construct a new 6000-seat stadium at Nunnery Way. Following a deal falling through. Worcester presently play their home games at Victoria Park. Home of Bromsgrove Sporting.

=== Workington ===
- Current stadium status: Reconstructed.

Following their recent rise in status, Workington are redeveloping their Borough Park home, to comply with FA regulations. The ground formerly played host to league football until the club's relegation in 1977.

== Expelled clubs ==
=== Bury ===
- Current stadium status: Reconstructed.

In early 2015 many Bury supporters began speculating that the club were planning a move to nearby Pilsworth at former retail park, Park 66. The site is 2.3 miles from Bury's current home Gigg Lane. However, in 2016 chairman Stewart Day ruled out Park 66 and held talks with Bury Council to try to find a suitable site closer to the town centre.

== Defunct Clubs ==
=== Macclesfield Town ===
- Stadium: Moss Rose
- Capacity: 6,355
- Current stadium status: Reconstructed.
