= Local development framework =

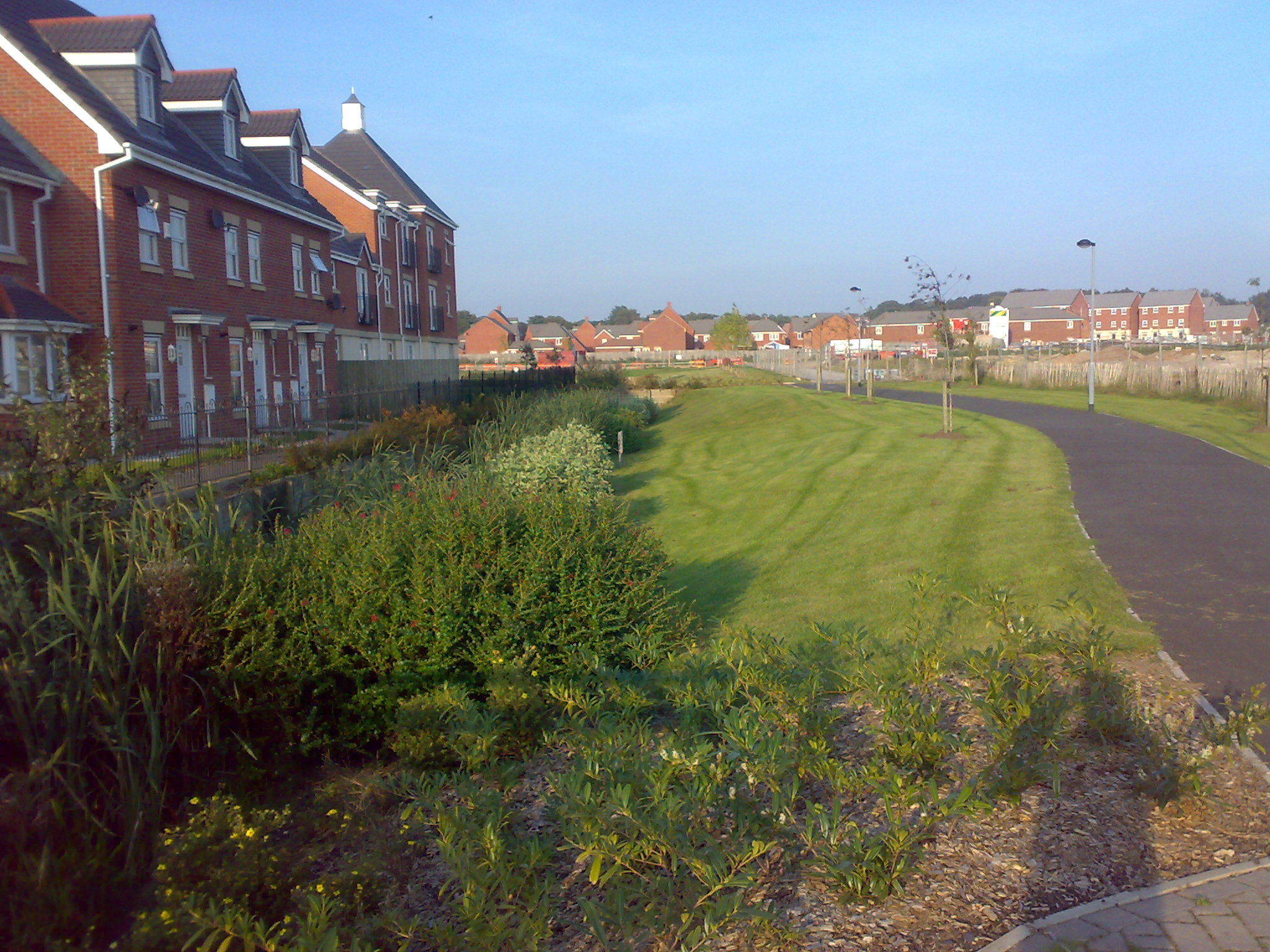
Buckshaw Village, Lancashire is an example of a recently planned development.

A local development framework is the spatial planning strategy introduced in England and Wales by the Planning and Compulsory Purchase Act 2004 and given detail in Planning Policy Statements 12. In most parts of the two countries, maintaining the framework is the responsibility of English district councils and Welsh principal area councils.

== Background ==
Planning Policy Statement 12: Creating Strong Safe and Prosperous Communities through Local Spatial Planning (commonly abbreviated as PPS 12), is a document produced by the British Government that sets out the Government's policy on the preparation of local development documents which will comprise the local development framework. The current version was introduced in June 2008 and replaces the original PPS 12: Local Development Frameworks which was produced in 2004.

The local development framework replaces the previous system of county level structure plans and district level local plans, and unitary development plans for unitary authorities.

The previous system was perceived as being too inflexible and difficult to change in a timely manner. The local development framework system is intended to improve this situation by replacing the old plans with a new portfolio of local development documents that can be tailored to suit the different needs of a particular area and can be easily updated.

The frameworks were prepared within a regional spatial strategy (RSS) prepared for each region by the Secretary of State (specifically the Deputy Prime Minister). Local development frameworks were required to have regard to the RSS until they were abolished in 2010.

All PPS were replaced by the National Planning Policy Framework in 2012. Chapter 3 sets out the requirements for plan-making.

== Composition ==
The local development documents taken as a whole must set out the authority's policies relating to the development and use of land in their area. In the case of LDDs included in a minerals and waste development scheme, the LDDs together must also set out the authority's policies relating to minerals and waste development.

Each framework will be a folder containing a number of inter-related documents. The Core Strategy, development plan documents and statement of community involvement are compulsory, with other documents being optional.

=== Local development scheme ===
This is a public 'project plan' which identify which local development documents will be produced, in what order and when. The local development scheme acts as the starting point for the community and stakeholders to find out about the local authority's planning policies in respect to a particular place or issue, and what the status of those policies is. It also outlines the details of, and timetable for the production of all documents that make up the local development framework over a three-year period. All local authorities submitted their local development schemes to the Secretary of State by the end of March 2005

=== Development plan documents ===
These include the core strategy document and the local plan. The Town and Country Planning (Local Development) (England) Regulations 2004 (SI 2004/2204) lays out details they must comply with. It is a statutory instrument that sets out the specific local development documents which local planning authorities in England are required to prepare and how that should be done. Essentially, the Act gives detail to the British Government's revisions to the planning system by means of the Planning and Compulsory Purchase Act 2004. It came into force on 28 September 2004.

=== Statement of community involvement ===
The SCI should explain to the public how they will be involved in the preparation of the framework. They should set out the standards to be met by the authority in terms of community involvement, building upon the minimum requirements set out in the Regulations and PPS 12. Prior to the statement being adopted, local authorities must ensure that any plan preparation work meets these minimum requirements.

A key outcome of the SCI will be to encourage 'front loading' meaning that consultation with the public begins at the earliest stages of each document's development so that communities are given the fullest opportunity to participate in plan making and to make a difference.

=== Annual monitoring report ===
The Annual Monitoring Report is submitted to government by a local planning authority at the end of December each year to assess the progress and the effectiveness of a Local Development Framework, specifically:

- Are policies achieving their objectives, and is sustainable development being delivered?
- Have policies had the intended consequences?
- Are the assumptions and objectives behind policies still relevant?
- Are the targets set in the Local Development Framework being achieved?

To achieve this goal, the Annual Monitoring Report includes a range of local and standard (Core Output) indicators.

=== Optional development plan documents ===
- Area Action Plan: an optional development plan document aimed at establishing a set of proposals and policies for the development of a specific area (such as a town centre or an area of new development) of a district authority. There is no limit on the number of area action plans that a local authority can develop.
- Supplementary planning documents: established as part of the Planning and Compulsory Purchase Act 2004 in United Kingdom law, SPDs may cover a range of issues, thematic or site-specific, and provides further detail of policies and proposals in a 'parent' development plan document.
- Local development orders
- Simplified planning zones

Sometimes certain policies from an old document remain effective when that document is superseded. These policies are known as "saved" policies.

=== Legal requirements of all local development documents ===
They should be prepared in accordance with the local development scheme and should have regard to section 19 of the Planning and Compulsory Purchase Act 2004:

- National policies and advice contained in guidance issued by the Secretary of State,
- The regional spatial strategy for the region in which the area of the authority is situated, if the area is outside Greater London. Also the RSS for any region which adjoins the area of the authority or the Wales Spatial Plan if any part of the authority's area adjoins Wales
- The spatial development strategy if the authority is London borough or if any part of the authority's area adjoins Greater London
- The community strategy prepared by the authority and also any other authority whose area comprises any part of the area of the local planning authority
- Any other local development documents which has been adopted by the authority
- The resources likely to be available for implementing the proposals in the document
- Such other matters as the Secretary of State prescribes.
- They should comply with the statement of community involvement (once the statement is adopted)
- The local planning authority must appraise the sustainability of each development plan document and report the findings.

Development plan documents are subject to rigorous procedures of community involvement, consultation and independent examination. Once adopted, development control decisions must be made in accordance with the DPDs unless material considerations indicate otherwise.

DPDs must be examined with a sustainability appraisal to ensure economic, environmental and social effects of the plan are in line with sustainable development targets.

== Key government aims ==
1. Flexibility
2. Strengthening community and stakeholder involvement
3. Front-loading sometimes – local authorities to take key decisions early in the preparation of local development documents.
4. Sustainability appraisal
5. Programme management
6. Soundness – local development documents must be soundly based in terms of their content and the process by which they are produced. The must also be based upon a robust, credible evidence base.

== Criticism ==
In practice, many local authorities have found Local Development Frameworks difficult to implement. Although progress on Local Development Frameworks was made in the years 2012–2015, an assessment by Nathaniel Lichfield and Partners has found any progress to be "marginal".

== See also ==
- Development control in the United Kingdom
- London Plan
- Planning and Compulsory Purchase Act 2004
- Planning Policy Statements
- Town and country planning in the United Kingdom
