= Local area agreement =

A local area agreement (LAA) in the United Kingdom is a three-year agreement between central government and a local area working through its Local Strategic Partnership. It contains a set of improvement targets which local organisations are committed to achieving and a delivery plan setting out what each partner is intending to do to achieve those targets.

LAA targets have to reflect the vision, priorities and challenges set out in the Sustainable Community strategy, which are 10-year vision statements for a given area required by national government. LAA targets are chosen in discussion with all partners, and are then negotiated with Government Departments, working through Regional Government Offices. In two-tier counties (i.e. counties with both district and county councils) LAAs are drawn up by the upper-tier authorities, that is, counties, unitaries, London boroughs.

Government provides a reward grant at the end of 3 years if LAA targets have been achieved.

LAAs were first introduced in 2004/05, starting with 20 pilot areas and extending across the country in three phases. The Local Government and Public Involvement in Health Act 2007 placed LAAs on statutory footing. All upper-tier local authorities were required to draw up a new LAA for the three-year period 2008/09 to 2010/11.

As of June 2008, LAAs are in place for all 150 upper-tier local authority areas in England. Different arrangements apply in Wales. In October 2010 it was announced that LAAs were to be abolished by Local Government Secretary Eric Pickles.
