= Structure plan =

Type of spatial planning

Structure planning is a type of spatial planning and is part of urban planning practice in the United Kingdom and Western Australia. A structure plan in any jurisdiction will usually consist of a written component, supported by maps, photographs, sketches, tables and diagrams and a 'plan' component consisting of one or more plans illustrating land use and infrastructure proposals for the area being planned.

In the United Kingdom a structure plan was an old-style development plan required by United Kingdom planning law between 1968 and 2004. Structure plans set out strategic planning policies and formed the basis for detailed policies in local plans. Although no longer prepared, these plans continue to operate in many areas following the commencement of the new development plan system introduced by the Planning and Compulsory Purchase Act 2004, due to transitional provisions.

In Western Australia structure plans are commonly prepared at subregional, district and local levels. Typically, subregional structure plans are informed by higher level policy and strategy and deliver sufficient information to identify areas that should be excluded from development, guide the planning of major infrastructure and the broadscale zoning of land at the regional level. Similarly, district structure plans are informed by relevant policies and strategies, any subregional structure plan and by any detailed engineering of major infrastructure affecting that district. Local structure plans repeat this process to the level of local roads, land subdivision, sites for community facilities, parks, utilities, etc. in order to inform the final phase of road and infrastructure construction and the zoning of the land.

== United Kingdom ==
Structure plans were first introduced by the Town and Country Planning Act 1968, as strategic level development plans, prepared either by a county council or by local authorities working jointly together. They consisted of a broad framework of policies looking forward up to 20 years ahead, supported by a "key diagram" showing land use, transport and environmental proposals diagrammatically (that is, not on a locationally specific map base). Local plans, prepared by district rather than county councils, were required to accord with the overall strategy set out in the structure plan.

Structure plans were increasingly criticised in the 1980s and 1990s for the length of time taken in their preparation and adoption, their often abstract nature, and for imposing an unnecessary level of policy above the level of the local district council. This became increasingly apparent with the establishment of regional planning conferences (later Regional Assemblies) and the development of Regional Planning Guidance after the mid-1980s.

Structure plans in the UK were abolished as part of the new development plan system introduced following the 2004 legislation. They were replaced by Regional Spatial Strategies and by Local Development Documents, particularly Core Strategies. Regional Spatial Strategies have since been abolished as part of the 2010 Coalition Government's abolition of Regional Development Agencies. At a local level, Local Plans are now closest in nature to the former structure plans.

== Western Australia ==
In Western Australia structure plans do not have a legal status under the Planning and Development Act 2005 and cannot therefore directly control the use of land. However, they are provided for by State Planning Policies prepared under that Act by the Western Australian Planning Commission and one of their key functions is to propose land use zoning changes and to provide the planning logic to support such changes.

In contrast to United Kingdom practice, Australian structure plans are spatially precise, particularly in regard to the elements of the plan (e.g. boundaries of land to be protected, land to be reserved for major infrastructure, etc.) that are intended to be 'fixed' spatially by a particular plan. Elements that are not intended to be fixed at that level of planning may be indicated approximately and 'fixed' spatially by a subsequent, more detailed level of structure plan.
