= LCDP =

LCDP is a community development organisation working across the city of Lincoln and the county of Lincolnshire.

== History ==
Originally known as Lincoln Community Development Project, LCDP was initiated by the churches of Lincoln to address economic and community development within the city of Lincoln.

It was launched by a group of people in January 1997, led by Andrew Vaughan, industrial chaplain in Lincoln. On the origins of the project, Andrew has said the following:

"There were a lot of creative projects going on like the regeneration of Sessions House and new training schemes being put together, but I felt there was a missing ingredient," he said.

"I thought you can have all this opportunity for people but, unless they feel motivated themselves and supported in a way that forms aspirations, then the great things that were out there would remain untapped."

The project now also provides training courses, funding advice and support to small organisations. Historically the LCDP provided small grants through the Community Chest scheme, but no longer does so.

The project is a Company Limited by Guarantee and has achieved charitable status.

== Funding ==
The project has received funding and support from a variety of UK and European based public and private funding streams. Present funding for the project comes from:

- European Social Fund
- European Regional Development Fund
- Neighbourhood Renewal Fund
- Lloyds TSB
- Safer & Stronger Communities Fund (SSCF)
- Big Lottery Fund
- Community Empowerment Fund
- Community Chest
- Single Programme
- Sure Start
- Lincolnshire NHS
- Urban Challenge
- City of Lincoln Council

== Neighbourhood Management Teams ==
In September 2006 LCDP received funding through the Neighbourhood Renewal Fund via the City of Lincoln Council to work in partnership to set up two Neighbourhood Management Teams, on the St Giles and Moorland estates of the City of Lincoln.

== BME Mental Health Project ==
In January 2007 LCDP began work with the local primary care trust to work with Black and minority ethnic groups across Lincolnshire to combat barriers preventing members of BME communities to access mental healthcare.
