= UWE Stadium =

Cancelled stadium in Cheswick, England

- Artist's impression of the proposed UWE Stadium
- Interactive map of UWE Stadium
- Location: Cheswick, South Gloucestershire
- Coordinates: 51.4989°N 2.5571°W
- Owner: Bristol Rovers
- Operator: Bristol Rovers
- Capacity: 21,700

Construction
- Cost: £40 million
- Architect: Arturus Architects LLP
- Main contractor: Buckingham Group Contracting Ltd

Tenant
- Bristol Rovers

Website
- www.uwestadium.com

UWE Stadium was a proposed 21,700 all-seater stadium to be built in Cheswick, South Gloucestershire, as a new home for Bristol Rovers. The stadium was to replace their current home, the Memorial Stadium. Sainsbury's agreed to buy the Memorial Stadium in 2011 and lease it to the club while the new stadium was built to the north of the city.

However, in 2014 the future of the stadium was put in doubt due to a court battle with Sainsbury's over the contract for the Memorial Stadium site. In July 2015 Sainsbury's won its High Court battle with Bristol Rovers over the termination of the £30m deal to buy the Memorial Stadium. The future of the stadium became uncertain, with the club describing the ruling as a "kick in the teeth". Shortly after, the club were granted leave to appeal the decision which was completed in January 2016 and rejected in March 2016.

The following month, Bristol Rovers were sold to the Jordanian Al-Qadi family with outgoing chairman Nick Higgs confirming the outcome of the court case is "no longer relevant". The club's new president Wael al-Qadi confirmed a new stadium is a "key requirement" for the new owners.

In August 2017, the club announced the project had been cancelled as both parties were unable to agree acceptable terms.

== History ==
Having left their long-term home at Eastville Stadium in 1986, Bristol Rovers spent ten years in exile at Twerton Park in Bath. They finally moved back to Bristol in 1996, becoming joint owners of the Memorial Stadium with Bristol Rugby. They then went on to buy the rugby club's share in the ground in 1998. In 2007, Rovers were granted permission for a complete rebuild of the stadium but, following numerous delays, began seeking alternatives to redeveloping their current home.

On 9 June 2011, Bristol Rovers chairman Nick Higgs announced plans to build a 21,700 all-seater stadium in Cheswick in partnership with UWE. The application to build the stadium was submitted to South Gloucestershire Council on 9 March 2012.

On 19 July 2012, planning permission was granted for the stadium with councillors voting 12 to 1 in favour. The planning meeting for Sainsbury's Memorial Stadium application was initially expected to follow shortly after this, but was delayed and took place on 16 January 2013. Councillors granted permission for the plans, voting 6 to 3 in favour. This was followed by approval by the Secretary of State for Communities and Local Government Eric Pickles in March.

However, the project was put in doubt in September 2013 when a group named TRASHorfield filed an application for a judicial review against Sainsbury's plans which was granted in November. The review was held on 13 March 2014 and rejected by Mr Justice Hickinbottom a week later. TRASHorfield appealed this decision on 26 March 2014, which was dismissed by Mr Justice Hickinbottom the same day.

Doubts were raised about the stadium again in August 2014 after it emerged that Rovers had issued a writ against Sainsbury's, alleging that the supermarket chain was attempting to terminate its contract to buy the Memorial Stadium site. At a six-day High Court hearing in May 2015, Sainsbury's argued it had "lawfully terminated" the contract when planning conditions were not met before the "cut-off date" in the agreement. On 13 July 2015, Mrs Justice Proudman ruled in favour of Sainsbury's saying the way the deal was structured was an "insuperable barrier to the club". Rovers chairman Nick Higgs described it as a "huge disappointment" and stated "We will be asking them [UWE] to hang in there with us as it’s not over yet. We have looked at a number of other options to still bring this new stadium to fruition, even without the help of Sainsbury’s, and we will continue to do that. We have an obligation to explore options and it would be remiss of us not to do so for the sake of the fans, and for this club". The club were granted leave to appeal later the same month and confirmed Sainsbury's had made an out of court cash offer to end the litigation, which was rejected being described as 'derisory'. The appeal, held in January 2016, saw the club's lawyers claim Mrs Justice Proudman made a "fundamental error" in agreeing with the supermarket chain. The verdict from the two-day appeal came on 17 March 2016 and upheld the high court decision.

A further twist to the tale came in February 2016 when Bristol Rovers were purchased by the wealthy Al-Qadi family of Jordan, rending the outcome of the court case "no longer relevant" as described by former chairman Nick Higgs.

== Location ==
UWE Stadium shown in relation to Bristol

Proposed to be situated in the University of the West of England's Frenchay campus, it would have become the only 20,000+ seater stadium within a university campus in the UK. Though not within the city council boundary of Bristol, the stadium would have been located in the area sometimes known as Greater Bristol. The stadium will be located around 1.5 miles from Bristol Rovers current Memorial Stadium home and around 1.8 miles from their former ground at Eastville.

The UWE Stadium would have been just off the A4174 and a short drive from junction 1 of the M32. There would have been space for 1,000 cars and coaches with a further 1,500 spaces on campus if needed. It would have also additionally been close to both Filton Abbey Wood and Parkway train stations.

== Design ==
The bowl-shaped stadium would have been all-seated with an initial capacity of 21,700. The stadium has been designed to adhere to international standards for both football and rugby. However, following Bristol City majority shareholder Stephen Lansdown's takeover of Bristol Rugby, they have instead moved to play at Bristol City's Ashton Gate Stadium.

The stadium was designed to minimise the impact on the local environment, including using the topography of the site to effectively enclose the stadium and minimise noise and light disruption, as well as being designed to allow the capacity to be increased to 26,000 without making any external changes and up to 35,000 should it be needed.

Proposed facilities

- Supporters club bar
- Club shop
- 1000 seat conference centre and banqueting suite
- 28 executive boxes
- Convenience store
- Gym and jogging track
- Crèche
- 19,000sq ft of teaching space for UWE

== Criticism ==
UWE Students' Union website acknowledged that they had received student criticism but do not share such criticism.

== See also ==
- Development of stadiums in English football
