= Local development order =

An example of a Local Development Order.

In the United Kingdom, local development orders (LDOs) were introduced with the Planning and Compulsory Purchase Act 2004. They allow local authorities to extend permitted development rights for certain forms of development with regard to a relevant local development document.

== Development order ==
The Town and Country Planning Act 1990 states that

The Secretary of State shall by ... "development order"... provide for the granting of planning permission.

For example, this enabled the General Permitted Development Order 1995, allowing the SoS to set out what is 'permitted development'.
