= Local strategic partnership =

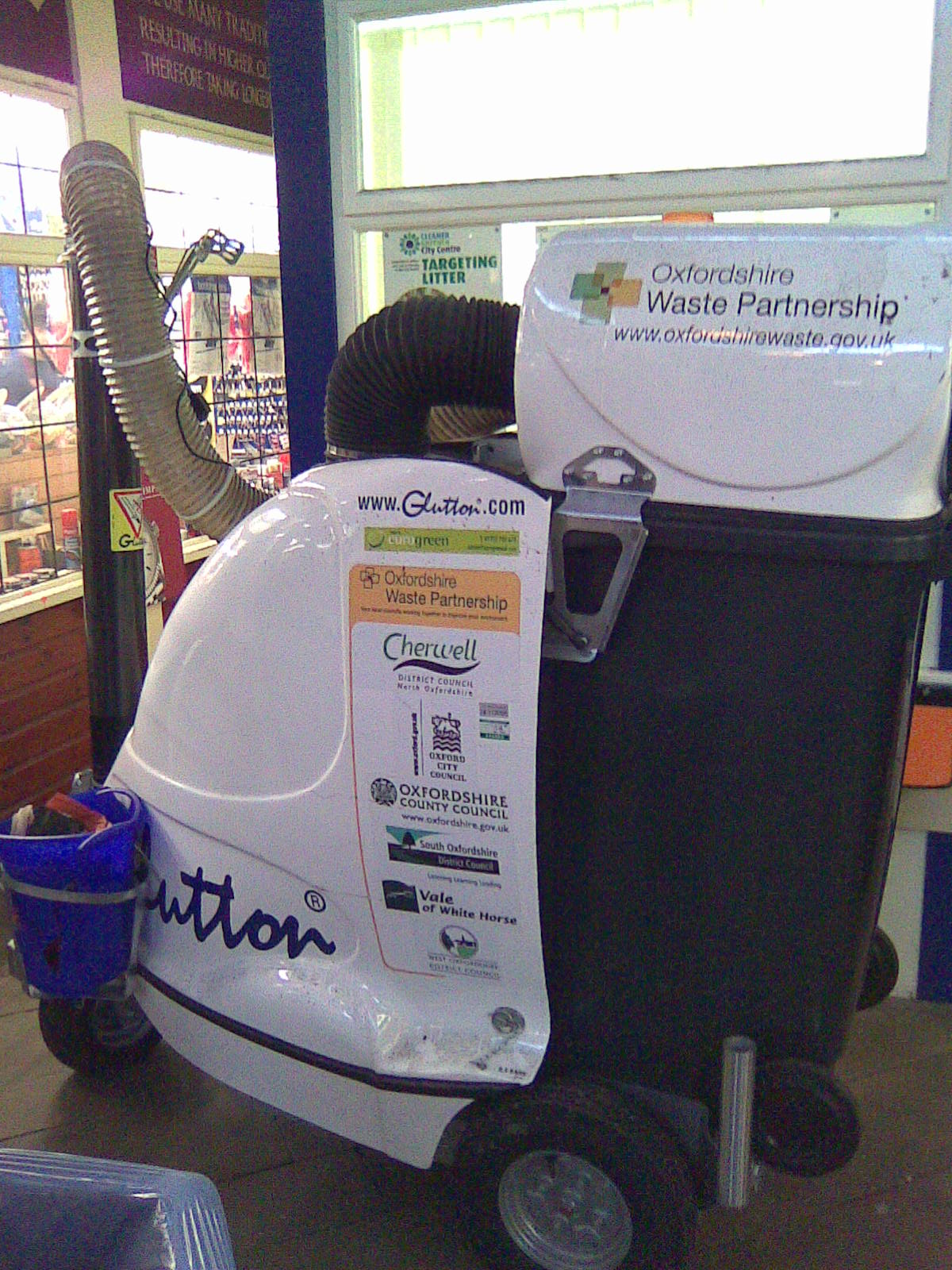
A piece of equipment of the Oxfordshire Waste Partnership, a local strategic partnership.

Local strategic partnerships (LSPs) exist in nearly all local authority areas in England. They bring together representatives from the local statutory, voluntary, community and private sectors to address local problems, allocate funding, and discuss strategies and initiatives. They aim to encourage joint working and community involvement, and prevent 'silo working' (i.e., different agencies that share aims working in isolation) with the general objective of ensuring resources are better allocated at a local level. In Scotland, equivalent partnerships are called Community Planning Partnerships and in Wales, Local Service Boards.

The structure of an LSP is flexible to a large degree, and is decided at the local level. This has resulted in a diverse collection of partnerships across the country, both in terms of who is represented and how they work. Differences in structure and process influence the effectiveness of each partnership. Equally important are local political history, and the relationships between the different organisations and sectors involved.

The first LSPs were set up around the year 2000. For 88 local authority areas in England (the most deprived according to the Index of Multiple Deprivation) that received Neighbourhood Renewal Fund funding from the Office of the Deputy Prime Minister – now the Department for Levelling Up, Housing and Communities – formation of an LSP was made a condition of receiving funding. In line with this source of funding, the work of most LSPs has tended to focus on 'regeneration and renewal'.

Involvement of the community is a key aspect of the government's vision of local strategic partnerships. Initially (with neighbourhood renewal funding) this was in the form of a community empowerment network (CEN). Again, the structure of the CEN is very much left up to the local voluntary and community sector. Often an umbrella body, for example a Council for Voluntary Service, will take on the role of co-ordinating the networks. Since dedicated funding for CENs ended around 50% of them have ceased to exist.

LSPs are an evolving partnership. Recently, they have been getting to grips with local area agreements – where money and decision-making power is taken from various traditional local bodies (for example, the primary care trust, local authority etc.) and given instead to the partnership.

Despite their potential impact on local governance and the implications this could have on the local democratic process, LSPs have suffered from a low profile outside (and even inside) those organisations and bodies that are involved. Some find this surprising. Others point out that it may be indicative of their lack of importance at a local level.

== See also ==
- Local enterprise partnership
