= Core strategy document =

The Hackney Core Strategy was produced by the local authority and adopted in 2010.

In the United Kingdom, a core strategy document is the key compulsory local development document specified in planning law. Every other local development document is built on the principles it sets out, regarding the development and use of land in a local planning authority's area. The principles should be in accordance with the community strategy.

The core strategy document usually lasts for 15 years.

== Legal requirements ==
Additional to the requirements of all local development documents, core strategy documents:-

- Should be location specific rather than site specific and so may be illustrated by a key diagram or on Ordnance Survey-based proposal maps.
- May need to be expressed as criteria-based policies.

== See also ==
- Development plan document
- Local plan
- The Town and Country Planning (Local Development) (England) Regulations 2004

== Examples ==
- Tunbridge Wells Borough Council
- Manchester City Council
