= Community Empowerment Network =

US non-profit organization

The Community Empowerment Network (CEN) is a US-based non-profit organization that focuses information technology education in rural communities and developing countries.

== History ==
CEN was founded by Robert Bortner in November 2004. Between 2002 and June 2004, Robert was managing the USAID-funded Rio Tapajós (Brazil) Telecenter Installation Project, which installed solar powered community operated telecenters in the communities of Suruacá and Maguari. After completion of this project, Bob continued to work with these communities and with the community of Xixuau, located approximately 500 km north of Manaus along the Rio Jauaperi, and he mentored key activists in the communities. Encouraged by their significant progress in addressing community challenges and becoming more independent, Bob launched CEN and continued this work as the Amazon Pilot Project. In April 2008 CEN began the implementation of the Creating a Culture of Learning and Empowerment in the Amazon (cCLEAR) Project. Angela Viehmayer, Director at Brazilian NGO (Link Social), and serving on the CEN board, is the Field Manager for the project to add a sustained presence to the communities.

== The CEN Amazon pilot project ==
CEN is working on a pilot project consisting of three communities in the Brazilian Amazon. In two communities located along the upper Tapajós River, it helped manage the installation of solar-powered, internet-connected telecenters, which was completed by mid-2004.

This project was selected as a finalist in the 2006 Stockholm Challenge

== See also ==
- Community empowerment network
