= Community empowerment network =

In the United Kingdom, community empowerment networks (CENs) are networks of a collection of local community, voluntary and third sector organisations and groups, set up by the central government as part of an initiative to foster community involvement in regeneration at a local level. They get together periodically to discuss issues of concern to them in relation to regeneration plans. CENs exist locally across the UK. A CEN forms an important but small part of a Local Strategic Partnership.

== Statement ==
Statement from the Improvement and Development Agency's Website idea statement:

As a crucial part of the Government's drive to reduce the gap between England's poorest communities and the country as a whole, the ‘National Strategy for Neighbourhood Renewal’ published in 2001, seeks to influence change at a local level.

The Neighbourhood Renewal Fund provides a grant to 88 of the most deprived local authority areas to fund the work of Local Strategic Partnerships (LSPs) in improving services and targeting resources more effectively.

Since 2001, £43 million a year has been invested in developing community empowerment networks through the Single Community Programme in order to foster community involvement in neighbourhood renewal initiatives. To date, these networks have funded 25,000 community projects, provided the LSPs with access to a wider community network and led community development work.

== See also ==
- Community Empowerment Network
- Capacity building
- Social entrepreneurship
