= National Development Framework (Wales) =

Welsh Government spatial plan, 2004–2021

The National Development Framework (Welsh: Fframwaith Datblygu Cenedlaethol) is a statutory spatial development strategy for Wales that is written and published by the Welsh Government. It is updated from time to time.

== Background ==
Until 2021, spatial planning policy for Wales had been set out in the Wales Spatial Plan.

The Planning (Wales) Act 2015 enabled the Welsh Government to publish the National Development Framework.

The National Development Framework was first published in August 2019. It was published in full in February 2021. The Welsh Government announced revisions to the agreement in 2026.

== Policies ==
Planning authorities in Wales are required to publish local development plans that comply with the framework.

The draft version of the plan published in 2019 identified locations for homes and renewable energy.

The 2021 version of the framework contains a focus on urban growth and regeneration, affordable housing and economic growth.

Sub-regions of Wales, along the boundaries of the corporate joint committees, each have specific policies under the plan, but 2019 draft plan did not use the corporate joint committees as the basis for its choice of sub-regions.
