= Neighbourhood Management Pathfinder Programme =

The Neighbourhood Management Pathfinder Programme was a co-operative programme in England between residents and stakeholders such as the local authority, businesses etc., aimed at improving specific deprived neighbourhoods.

The programme was sponsored, and part funded, by the Neighbourhood Renewal Unit of the Department for Communities and Local Government who are responsible for overseeing the UK Government's neighbourhood renewal strategy in England.

The programme was started in July 2001 when twenty schemes were announced. Fifteen further programmes started in December 2002. All schemes received revenue grants over a seven-year period to pump prime the renewal initiatives. After seven years, the schemes continued to operate within existing funding provisions. It was cancelled abruptly in 2011, leaving considerable dereliction in many Midland and Northern cities.

== See also ==
- Housing Market Renewal Initiative
- Neighbourhood Renewal Fund
