= Neighbourhood Renewal Fund =

Neighbourhood Renewal Fund (NRF) is a form of Local Government finance in England, launched by the Office of the Deputy Prime Minister in July 2000.

NRF is allocated to multi-agency Local Strategic Partnerships (LSPs) in the 88 Local Authority areas judged to be the most deprived based on the 2000 Indices of Multiple Deprivation. It is intended to be spent on the social regeneration of the areas to which it has been awarded, and on interventions designed to reduce the relative deprivations in those areas (such as health inequalities, educational underachievement and high crime rates).

== See also ==
- Neighbourhood Management Pathfinder Programme
- Start Up Citywide
