= Castle Leazes =

Piece of common land in England

Leazes Park
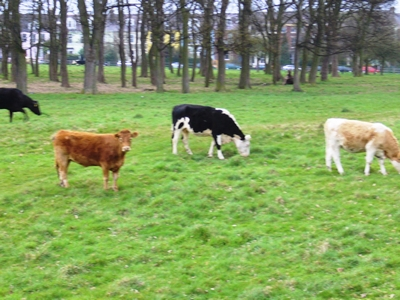
- Cows grazing on Castle Leazes, 2006

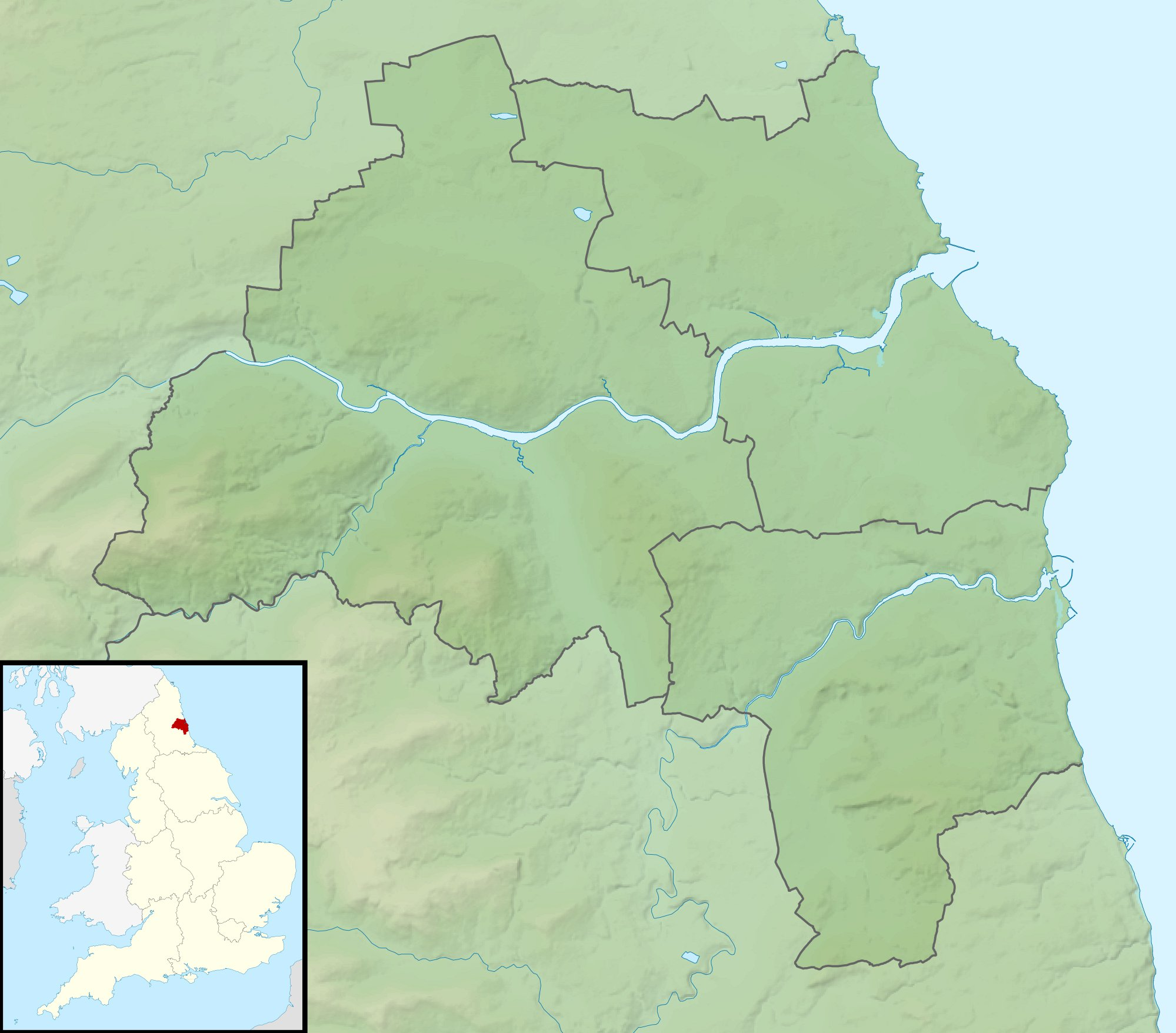
- Location within Tyne and Wear
- Interactive map of Leazes Park
- OS grid: NZ242649
- Coordinates: 54°59′N 1°37′W

Castle Leazes is a piece of common land in Newcastle upon Tyne. It is situated in an area which separates Leazes Park and Spital Tongues. It has been in common ownership for over 700 years.

This area of land was earmarked as the site of a new stadium by Newcastle United football club in the mid-1990s, when chairman John Hall announced his intention to build a 55,000 seater stadium was planned at a potential cost of £65 million. The planned move proved controversial with the club's supporters and others, and was shelved in favour of expanding St James' Park to over 50,000 seats over the next few years.

== Castle Leazes Halls ==
The Castle Leazes Halls, built in 1969, were Newcastle University's second largest catered Halls of Residence, with approximately 1,050 student study bedrooms. The halls closed in 2024 under a £250m redevelopment plan to provide new student accommodation on the site. Demolition of the buildings was completed by Spring 2025. The new development will create 2,000 student bedrooms, and is due to open in time for the 2028/9 academic year.
