= Wales Spatial Plan =

Welsh Government spatial plan, 2004–2021

The Wales Spatial Plan (Welsh: Cynllun Gofodol Cymru) was a statutory spatial development strategy for Wales that was written by the Welsh Government. It was updated from time to time.

== Background ==
Before the Wales Spatial Plan, the equivalent of a spatial plan had been Planning Guidance (Wales): Planning Policy, a document published by the Welsh Office, under the shared of planning law of England and Wales.

The Planning and Compulsory Purchase Act 2004 enabled the National Assembly for Wales to publish the Wales Spatial Plan.

The first version of the Wales Spatial Plan was published in November 2004. It was updated in 2008. The Wales Spatial Plan was replaced by the National Development Framework in 2021.

== Contents ==
The plan divided Wales into several sub-regions and contained specific policies dedicated to each region.

The 2004 plan endorsed considering southeast Wales as a "city region".

The 2008 version of the plan divided the plan identified Wales as having extremely "fuzzy" boundaries.
