= Cheswick, Gloucestershire =

Village in England

Coordinates: 51.498°N 2.56°W

Cheswick
- Location within Gloucestershire
- Civil parish: Stoke Park and Cheswick
- Unitary authority: South Gloucestershire, Bristol
- Ceremonial county: Gloucestershire
- Region: South West
- Country: England
- Sovereign state: United Kingdom
- Post town: BRISTOL
- Postcode district: BS16
- Dialling code: 0117
- Police: Gloucestershire
- Fire: Gloucestershire
- Ambulance: South Western
- UK Parliament: Filton and Bradley Stoke; Bristol North West

Cheswick (/ˈtʃɛzɪk/) is a new village bridging the South Gloucestershire and Bristol borders. It straddles the boundaries of Stoke Gifford, Filton and Lockleaze and lies close to the major employment sites of the University of the West of England (UWE), and MoD Abbey Wood. The development has three points of motor vehicular access: From Coldharbour Lane, just south of the UWE East Entrance, and two bus and cycle only routes from the Abbey Wood Roundabout on the A4174 Avon Ring Road (the Cheswick Bus Link) and from Lockleaze (Romney Avenue).

== Development ==
Construction started in 2008 and was expected to be completed in 2015 with a total of 1,100 houses. Prior to construction the land was part of Wallscourt Farm and Hewlett Packard. The houses have been constructed by Redrow Homes, Elan Homes and Taylor Wimpey and local housing associations Curo Group (previously known as Somer Housing Group), Solon Housing, Sovereign Housing and Affinity Sutton. The structure of the village consists of a long central road called Long Down Avenue with a central square. Until 2023 it was part of Stoke Gifford parish, on 1 April 2023 it became part of Stoke Park and Cheswick.

== Transport links ==
The Cheswick bus link opened on 17 September 2012; it was built to cut journey times to UWE by avoiding the Avon Ring Road and Coldharbour Lane, which often became congested.

Buses also link Cheswick with Bristol city centre via the Romney Avenue bus and cycle only road via Lockleaze.

The village is within walking distance of Filton Abbey Wood railway station and also has direct bus links to Bristol Parkway railway station.
