= Memorial Stadium (Bristol) =

Stadium in Bristol, England

- The Mem
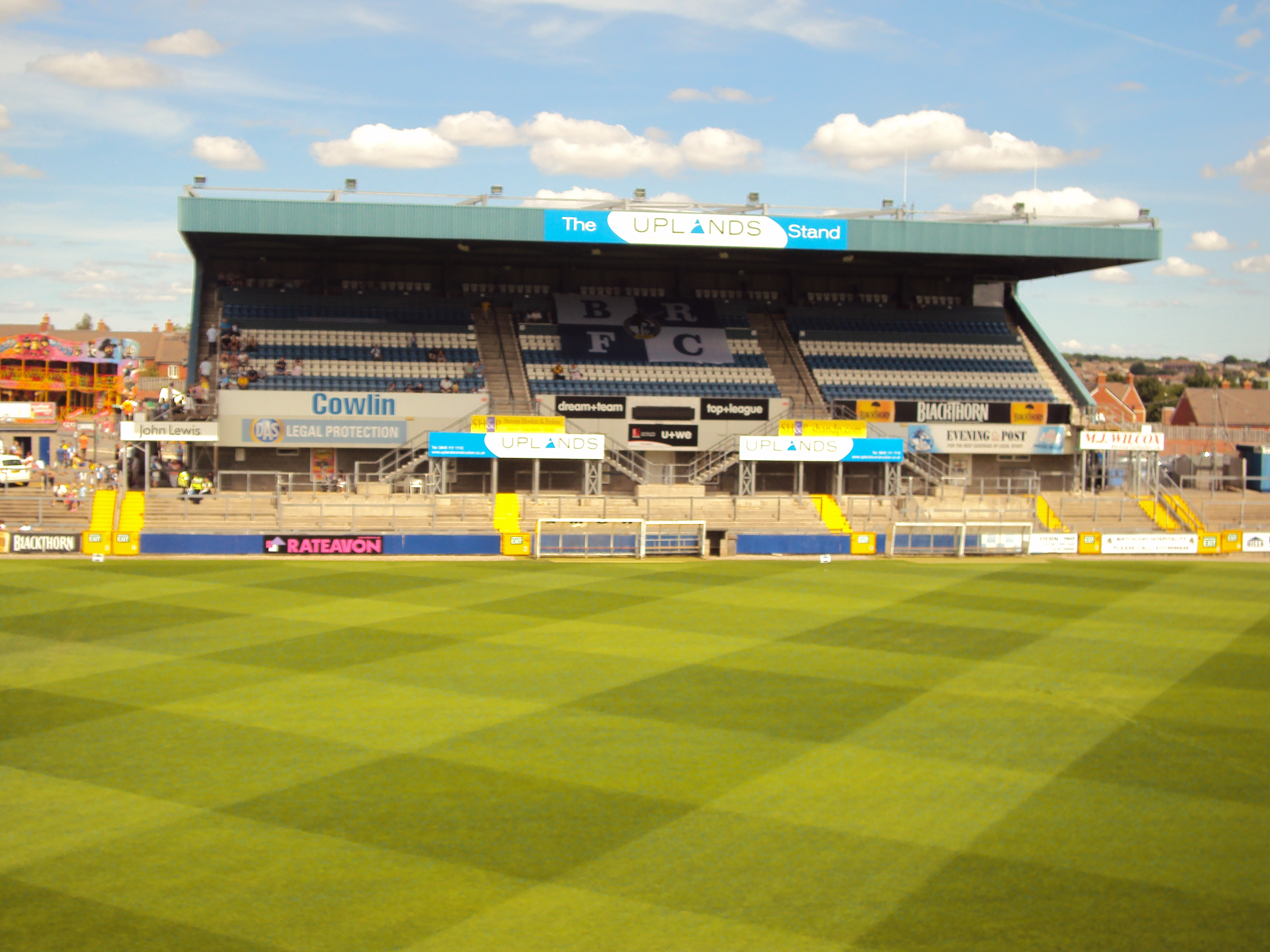
- DriBuild Stand at the Memorial Stadium, c. 2010
- Interactive map of Memorial Stadium
- Former names: Memorial Ground
- Location: Filton Avenue, Horfield, Bristol, BS7 0AQ
- Coordinates: 51.4862°N 2.5831°W
- Owner: Bristol Rovers F.C.
- Capacity: 12,500
- Surface: Grass
- Record attendance: 12,011 (Bristol Rovers vs West Bromwich Albion, 9 March 2008)
- Field size: 101 × 68 metres
- Public transit: Ashley Down

Construction
- Opened: 24 September 1921

Tenants
- Bristol Rovers (1996–present); Bristol Rovers Women (2024–present); Bristol Rugby (1921–2014)

Locally Listed Building
- Official name: Bristol Memorial Ground
- Designated: 1 September 2016
- Reference no.: 383

The Memorial Stadium, also commonly known by its previous name of the Memorial Ground, is a sports ground in Horfield, Bristol, England, which has been the home of Bristol Rovers Football Club since the 1996-97 season. It opened in 1921, dedicated to the memory of local rugby union players killed during the First World War and was the home of Bristol Rugby Club until they moved to Ashton Gate in 2014.

== History ==
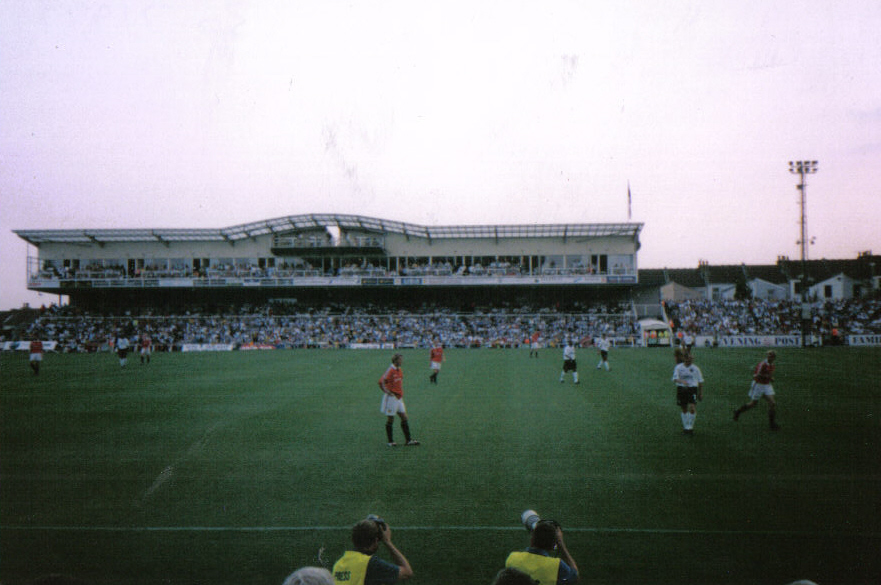
Bristol Rovers v Manchester United at the Memorial Stadium, 1999

The site was created on an area of land called Buffalo Bill's Field, after Colonel William "Buffalo Bill" Cody's Wild West Show was held there between 28 September and 3 October 1891. Two years later, in September 1893, Clifton RFC played on the site for the first time.

During the First World War the site was converted into allotments, but after the war, Buffalo Bill's Field was bought by the Sheriff of Bristol, Sir Francis Nicholas Cowlin, and given to Bristol Rugby Club. It was opened as the Memorial Ground on 24 September of that year by G. B. Britton, the Lord Mayor of Bristol.

Situated on Filton Avenue in Horfield, Bristol, it has been developed significantly over the years. A massive crowd turned out to watch the first Bristol game to be held there against Cardiff but did so from wooden terraces and stands. With the advent of leagues in the late 1980s, Bristol looked to develop the ground, replacing the old Shed on the north side with the Centenary Stand, to mark the club's 100th anniversary in 1988. The West Stand, an original feature of the ground, was demolished in 1995, having been condemned, and was replaced.

In 1996, Bristol Rovers moved in as tenants of Bristol Rugby Club and then entered into joint ownership through the Memorial Stadium Company. After just two years, in 1998, the rugby club was relegated from the Premiership (causing severe financial difficulties). Under the agreement's terms, Bristol Rovers could buy Bristol Rugby's share of the stadium for a "nominal fee," a clause designed to protect either party should one or the other fall into financial difficulties. The rugby club became tenants in their original home.

By 2005, the Memorial Stadium was hosting Bristol Rugby Club back in the Guinness Premiership, with Bristol Rovers continuing to compete in the lower levels of the Football League. A roof was added to the Clubhouse Terrace, paid for by Bristol Rovers supporters, and temporary stands at the south and south-west of the ground raised capacity to 11,916. Bristol Rugby were again relegated from the Premiership in 2009.

In February 2013, after months of speculation, Bristol Rugby announced they would move and share a ground with Bristol City at the redeveloped Ashton Gate. The rugby club played their final game at "The Mem" on 4 June 2014, a Championship play-off final second leg against London Welsh. There was no fairytale ending for Bristol, though, as London Welsh won the game 21–20 to condemn the side to a sixth straight season outside the Premiership.

The ground has remained a focal point for the wider Bristol community, and a minute's silence is held annually at the closest game to Remembrance Sunday. In contrast, on 11 November, a service of remembrance is held at the Memorial Gates, and players and officials from Bristol Rovers and Bristol Rugby attend the service each year. On Christmas Eve 2015, the memorial gates were vandalised by Bristol City supporters.

== Other uses ==
The stadium is also used for the rugby varsity between the city's universities, the University of the West of England and the University of Bristol. In 2013, the stadium hosted the Rugby League World Cup Group D match between the Cook Islands and the United States, attracting a crowd of 7,247. Gloucester Rugby played two pre-season friendlies at the stadium whilst their home ground, Kingsholm Stadium, was used for the 2015 Rugby World Cup.

In 2017, people over 18 were invited to form a crowd at the Memorial Stadium to provide audio for the forthcoming Aardman Animations film Early Man. The stadium features in the music videos for Kano's This Is England and Idles' Great.

== Stadium future ==
The Memorial Stadium Company proposed a wide-ranging £35 million refurbishment of the Memorial Stadium, bringing it up to an 18,500 all-seater capacity. On 17 January 2007, Bristol City Council granted permission for the stadium redevelopment.

The new stadium would have included a 97-room hotel, 99 student flats, a restaurant, a convenience store, offices, and a public gym.

On 17 August 2007, it was announced that the stadium's redevelopment had been delayed and would commence in May 2008 and finish in December 2009. During this period of reconstruction, Bristol Rovers would have groundshared with Cheltenham Town at Whaddon Road, while Bristol Rugby would have played across the Severn Bridge, sharing the Rodney Parade ground in Newport. The Section 106 legal agreement, which was the main cause for the delay in the redevelopment, was finally signed on 4 January 2008. Still, more delays were encountered when, on 30 May 2008, Rovers admitted that their preferred student accommodation providers had pulled out of the project, leaving the club to find an alternative company. This caused the redevelopment to be put back another year, to 2009. More delays, mainly attributed to the ongoing financial crisis, meant that by mid-2011, the stadium redevelopment had yet to begin.

In June 2011, Bristol Rovers announced its intention to relocate the club to the newly proposed UWE Stadium instead of redeveloping the Memorial Stadium. To fund the new stadium, the Memorial Stadium was to be sold to supermarket chain Sainsbury's, with Rovers paying a peppercorn rent and working to redevelop the site, not beginning until Rovers completed their move to the new stadium. Planning permission was granted for the UWE Stadium site in July 2012, and Sainsbury's plans for the Memorial Stadium in January 2013. Work was expected to begin on the UWE Stadium shortly after, but multiple delays caused by legal challenges held the project up. In 2014, Sainsbury's pulled out of the project and was subsequently taken to court by Rovers. Sainsbury's won the case and an appeal, leaving the entire project in doubt again.

In August 2017, following the takeover of the club by the Al-Qadi family and extensive negotiations with UWE, the club announced that it was no longer looking to build a new stadium in collaboration with UWE, and would once again explore redeveloping the Memorial Stadium instead.

Before the 2019/20 League One campaign, Rovers redeveloped the bar under the Poplar Insulation stand and subsequently reopened it as a "club superstore." The new club bar replaces the former club shop.

On 28 April 2023, Bristol Rovers announced plans to remove the South Stand, a temporary tent that had been there since the stadium's redevelopment in 1995/1996. In June 2023, the stand had been completely removed and the land was ready to be rebuilt. The stand will increase the stadium's capacity by 3,414 seats and will boost the stadium's capacity to 12,500. In July, local media reported that work on the new stand had commenced without planning permission. A statement released on 2 August 2023 confirmed that "due to issues outside of the club's control," the improved south stand would not be ready for the start of the new season. On 15 November 2023, it was confirmed that planning permission had been granted with conditions.

In October 2023, Rovers' new owner, Hussain AlSaeed, confirmed that the club's proposed move to a potential new stadium at the Fruit Market site had fallen through and they would instead focus on redeveloping the Memorial Stadium. The plans included development on the East and North stands upon completion of the South Stand, increasing the ground's capacity to between 16-17,000.

== Average attendances ==
Season	Bristol Rovers			
Season	Attendance	League		
2025–26	8,051	League Two		
2024–25	7,880	League One		
2023–24	8,190	League One		
2022–23	8,907	League One		
2021–22	7,512	League Two		
2020–21	0 (Note: No fans permitted for the 2020–21 season on account of the COVID-19 pandemic)	League One		
2019–20	7,348	League One		
2018-19	8,320	League One		
2017–18	8,933	League One		
2016–17	9,302	League One		
2015–16	8,096	League Two	Bristol Rugby	
2014–15	6,793	Conference Premier	Attendance	League
2013–14	6,420	League Two	5,808	Championship
2012–13	6,308	League Two	4,859	Championship
2011–12	6,035	League Two	5,351	Championship
2010–11	6,253	League One	4,273	Championship
2009–10	7,042	League One	5,261	Championship
2008–09	7,170	League One	7,435	Premiership
2007–08	6,849	League One	9,175	Premiership
