= Community strategy =

Planning document for an English local authority area

A community strategy (strictly speaking a "sustainable community strategy" (SCS) further to the Sustainable Communities Act 2007 is a long-term strategy for the economic, social and environmental well-being of a local authority area in England.

Community strategies were first mandated under section 4 of the Local Government Act 2000 (c. 22), which then related to England and Wales, although subsequent legislation has separated the provisions into discrete statutes for each nation.

Every principal Local Authority must have a Community Strategy 'for promoting or improving the economic, social and environmental well-being of their areas, and contributing to the achievement of sustainable development in the UK'. Each local authority should work with the voluntary sector and private sector, as well as local people, to agree the content.
