= Caborn =

Caborn may refer to

== People ==
- Richard Caborn (born 1943), a British politician
- Michael Caborn-Waterfield (1930–2016), a British business man

== Places ==
- Caborn, Indiana, an unincorporated community in Posey County, Indiana, United States

== Other ==
- Caborn-Welborn culture
- Caborn principles, in the United Kingdom, criteria for the calling in of planning applications
