= List of shipwrecks in May 1882 =

The list of shipwrecks in May 1882 includes ships sunk, foundered, grounded, or otherwise lost during May 1882.

== 1 May ==
List of shipwrecks: 1 May 1882
Ship	State	Description
Mohusser	India	The barque was wrecked at Saugor with much loss of life. There were at least ten survivors. She was on a voyage from Calcutta to Mauritius.
Western Belle	Flag unknown	The ship collided with an iceberg off the east coast of Canada and sank.

== 2 May ==
List of shipwrecks: 2 May 1882
Ship	State	Description
Acastus	United Kingdom	The brigantine was beached at Land's End, 3 nautical miles (5.6 km) north of Whitby, Yorkshire.
Fernwood	United Kingdom	The steamship ran aground in the Suez Canal. She was on a voyage from Cardiff, Glamorgan to Port Said, Egypt.

== 4 May ==
List of shipwrecks: 4 May 1882
Ship	State	Description
Alfgar, and White Sea	United Kingdom	The steamship Alfgar was run into by the steamship White Sea and sank in the Humber with the loss of one of the nineteen people on board. Alfgar was on a voyage from Hull, Yorkshire to Kronstadt, Russia. White Sea was severely damaged at the bow. She was on a voyage from Dundee, Forfarshire to Hull.

== 6 May ==
List of shipwrecks: 6 May 1882
Ship	State	Description
Pearl	United Kingdom	The fishing smack was run down and sunk off the mouth of the Humber by the steamship Falcon (United Kingdom) with the loss of a crew member.
Sappho	United States	The whaler, a barque, became a total loss when ice stove in her hull in the Bering Sea off Provideniya Bay on the southern coast of the Chukchi Peninsula of northeastern Siberia, Russia.

== 8 May ==
List of shipwrecks: 8 May 1882
Ship	State	Description
Carl and Auguste	Germany	The barque was abandoned in the Atlantic Ocean. Her thirteen crew were rescued. She was on a voyage from Hamburg to Miramichi, New Brunswick, Canada.
Melanope	United Kingdom	The ship collided with Carisbrooke (United Kingdom) at Rangoon, Burma and was severely damaged. Melanope was on a voyage from Melbourne, Victoria to Madras, India.
Navigation	United Kingdom	The steamship was driven ashore in the Kertch Strait. She was refloated with assistance.

== 9 May ==
List of shipwrecks: 9 May 1882
Ship	State	Description
City of St. Andrews	United Kingdom	The schooner was wrecked on Taylor's Bank, in Liverpool Bay. Her crew were rescued by a gig. She was on a voyage from Garston, Lancashire to Newry, County Antrim.
Garibaldi	United Kingdom	The smack was wrecked on the Thornham Ridge, in the North Sea off the coast of Norfolk. Her crew survived.

== 10 May ==
List of shipwrecks: 10 May 1882
Ship	State	Description
Emma	Germany	The ship collided with Leo (Germany) and sank off "Rieserhoft". Emma was on a voyage from Antwerp, Belgium to Danzig.
Harbinger	United Kingdom	The steamship ran aground in the Suez Canal. She was on a voyage from Bombay, India to Bordeaux, Gironde, France.

== 11 May ==
List of shipwrecks: 11 May 1882
Ship	State	Description
Bertha	United Kingdom	The steamship was driven ashore at Blackhead Point, Cornwall. She was on a voyage from Dunkirk, Nord, France to Belfast, County Antrim. She was on a voyage from two tugs and taken in to Falmouth, Cornwall.
Bessie Morris	United Kingdom	The steamship arrived at Malta on fire. She was on a voyage from Bombay, India to Antwerp, Belgium.
Ranelagh	New South Wales	The steamship ran aground on the King's Reef. All on board were rescued. She was on a voyage from Cairns to Cooktown, Queensland.
Young Harry	United Kingdom	The smack was run into by Amadia (United Kingdom) and sank in the North Sea. Her seven crew were rescued.

== 12 May ==
List of shipwrecks: 12 May 1882
Ship	State	Description
Stoomvaart	Netherlands	The steamship ran aground in the Zuyder Zee. She was on a voyage from Amsterdam, North Holland to Hamburg, Germany. She was refloated and resumed her voyage.

== 13 May ==
List of shipwrecks: 13 May 1882
Ship	State	Description
Dolphin	Germany	The barque foundered in the North Sea 13 nautical miles (24 km) north east by north of Heligoland. Her crew were rescued by the schooner Cuxhaven (Germany).
Pliny	United Kingdom	"The Wreck of the 'Pliny' at Deal Beach, New Jersey, Saturday, May 13," illustration from Harper's Weekly, 27 May 1882 The schooner-rigged steamship was wrecked during a storm about 200 yards (183 m) off Deal Beach on the coast of New Jersey, about 1 mile (1.6 km) south of Elberon. The United States Life-Saving Service rescued all 55 people on board. She broke in two on 16 May, and her wreck sank in 10 to 25 feet (3 to 8 m) of water.

== 14 May ==
List of shipwrecks: 14 May 1882
Ship	State	Description
Glance	United Kingdom	The Mersey Flat sank 1 nautical mile (1.9 km) off Point Lynas, Anglesey. Her crew survived. She was on a voyage from Connah's Quay, Flintshire to Amlwch, Anglesey.
Minstrel	(United Kingdom of Great Britain and Ireland) Guernsey	The ship ran aground on the Lejoy and sank. Her crew were rescued by Edessa (Flag unknown)/ Minstrel was on a voyage from Newcastle upon Tyne, Northumberland to Saint-Brieuc, Côtes-du-Nord, France.
Progress	United Kingdom	The schooner ran aground at Courtmacsherry, County Cork. She was on a voyage from Garston, Lancashire to Courtmacsherry. She was refloated and found to be severely leaky.

== 15 May ==
List of shipwrecks: 15 May 1882
Ship	State	Description
Oxion	United Kingdom	The fishing vessel was run down and sunk in the River Liffey by the steamship St. George (United Kingdom).

== 16 May ==
List of shipwrecks: 16 May 1882
Ship	State	Description
Delight	Grenada	The sloop sank off Bequia. All on board survived. She was on a voyage from Carriacou to Barbados.

== 17 May ==
List of shipwrecks: 17 May 1882
Ship	State	Description
City of Perth	United Kingdom	The ship was wrecked on the coast of New Zealand. She was subsequently refloated and towed in to Port Chalmers.
Hopper No. 5	United Kingdom	The hopper barge was run into and sunk by the steamship Raithwaite Hall (United Kingdom) at the mouth of the River Tyne. Her crew were rescued by a fishing smack.
Modern	United Kingdom	The ship was sighted in the South Atlantic whilst on a voyage from South Shields, County Durham to Java, Netherlands East Indies. No further trace, reported missing.
Zizine	United Kingdom	The barquentine sank in the Bay of Biscay. All nine people on board were rescued by Marchioness of Londonderry (United Kingdom). Zizine was on a voyage from Santander, Spain to Newport, Monmouthshire.

== 18 May ==
List of shipwrecks: 18 May 1882
Ship	State	Description
H. M. Thanhouser	United States	The steamship sank in the Ohio River near West Franklin, Indiana with the loss of one life.
Progress	Canada	The steamship was destroyed by fire at Green Island with the loss of three of her crew.
Rosetta	United Kingdom	The ship was run down and sunk by the Thames barge Elizabeth (United Kingdom) in the River Crouch off Foulness Island, Essex.

== 19 May ==
List of shipwrecks: 19 May 1882
Ship	State	Description
Constance	United Kingdom	The schooner was destroyed by fire at Queenborough Pier, Kent.
Consus	United Kingdom	The brigantine was destroyed by fire at Queenborough Pier.
Socotra	United Kingdom	The steamship was driven ashore at the entrance to the Gulf of Martaban and was wrecked. Her crew survived. She was on a voyage from Rangoon to Moulmein, Burma.

== 20 May ==
List of shipwrecks: 20 May 1882
Ship	State	Description
Athlete	United Kingdom	The steamship was abandoned in the Atlantic Ocean. Her thirteen crew were rescued by the steamship Alliance (United States). Athlete was on a voyage from Bilbao, Spain to Swansea, Glamorgan.

== 21 May ==
List of shipwrecks: 21 May 1882
Ship	State	Description
Harvey Mills	United Kingdom	The ship collided with the barqueEta (United Kingdom) and was beached at Crookhaven, County Cork. Harvey Mills was on a voyage from Carrizal Bajo, Chile to Swansea, Glamorgan. She was later refloated and towed in to Queenstown, County Cork for repairs.

== 23 May ==
List of shipwrecks: 23 May 1882
Ship	State	Description
Largo Bay	United Kingdom	The steamship was run ashore 30 nautical miles (56 km) from Ras Ghareb, Egypt. She was on a voyage from Bombay, India to Port Said, Egypt. She was refloated.

== 24 May ==
List of shipwrecks: 24 May 1882
Ship	State	Description
Hermann	GermanyUnited Kingdom	The schooner collided with the paddle steamer Great Western and sank in the English Channel. Her crew were rescued.

== 25 May ==
List of shipwrecks: 25 May 1882
Ship	State	Description
Bella	Denmark	The schooner was wrecked at "Strathjerbuk", on the west coast of Iceland with the loss of all twenty crew.
Lovenorn	Netherlands	The schooner was wrecked at "Strathjerbuk" with the loss of all twelve crew.

== 26 May ==
List of shipwrecks: 26 May 1882
Ship	State	Description
Black Watch	United Kingdom	The steamship ran aground in the River Suir. She was on a voyage from Waterford to Cardiff, Glamorgan She was refloated but found to be severely leaky and was beached at Check Point, County Waterford. The hole was patched and she resumed her voyage.
Canima	United Kingdom	The steamship ran aground on the Nantucket Shoals, off the coast of Massachusetts, United States. She was on a voyage from Saint John's, Newfoundland Colony to New York, United States.

== 28 May ==
List of shipwrecks: 28 May 1882
Ship	State	Description
Dictator	United Kingdom	The steamship was driven ashore at La Rochelle, Charente-Inférieure, France. She was on a voyage from Bilbao, Spain to an English port.

== 29 May ==
List of shipwrecks: 29 May 1882
Ship	State	Description
Mini	Germany	The schooner was driven ashore at "Aalsgaard", Denmark. She was on a voyage from Runcorn, Cheshire, United Kingdom to Pärnu, Russia.

== 30 May ==
List of shipwrecks: 30 May 1882
Ship	State	Description
Barletta	Italy	The steamship foundered near Yalta, Russia. Her crew were rescued by the steamship Unity (United Kingdom). Barletta was on a voyage from Taganrog, Russia to Gibraltar.
Flora	United Kingdom	The schooner ran aground on the Knavestone, in the Farne Islands, Northumberland. She subsequently broke her back and was consequently declared a total loss.
Lancaster	United Kingdom	The ship ran aground near Ras Ghareb, Egypt. She was on a voyage from Bombay, India to Dunkirk, Nord, France. She was refloated and towed in to Suez, Egypt in a severely damaged condition by the steamship Ossian (United Kingdom).

== 31 May ==
List of shipwrecks: 31 May 1882
Ship	State	Description
Louise Dorothea	Germany	The barque was driven ashore and wrecked in Mossel Bay with the loss of three of her crew. She was on a voyage from Port Augusta, South Australia to the Natal Colony.
Virago	United Kingdom	The steamship departed from Hull, Yorkshire for Constantinople, Ottoman Empire. No further trace, reported missing.

== Unknown date ==
List of shipwrecks: Unknown date in May 1882
Ship	State	Description
Alice and Kate	United Kingdom	The schooner struck the wreck of the steamship Albert (United Kingdom) and sank off Pemnarth, Glamorgan. She was later refloated and taken into the Glamorganshire Canal.
Austruweel	Belgium	The brig collided with the steamship Atlantico (Italy) and sank in the Atlantic Ocean. Her crew were rescued by Atlantico.
Avé Marie	France	The fishing vessel was wrecked on the coast of Iceland. Her crew survived.
Benjamin	France	The ship ran aground in the River Usk and was wrecked. She was on a voyage from L'Orient, Morbihan to Newport, Monmouthshire, United Kingdom.
Brilliant	Norway	The abandoned barque was taken in to IJmuiden, North Holland in a severely damaged condition. She was on a voyage from Savannah, Georgia, United States to Bremen, Germany.
Cashmere	United Kingdom	The ship was driven ashore at Newcastle, New South Wales. She was on a voyage from Newport, Monmouthshire to Newcastle.
Catherine Leed	Flag unknown	The ship was wrecked on San Salvador Island, Bahamas. She was on a voyage from New York to Gibara, Cuba.
Celæno	United Kingdom	The barque was destroyed by fire in the Atlantic Ocean. Her crew were rescued. She was on a voyage from Liverpool, Lancashire to Rio de Janeiro, Brazil.
Clift	United Kingdom	The Thames barge collided with the brigantine Charles P. Knight (United Kingdom) and sank in the River Thames off the Coalhouse Fort, Essex. Her crew were rescued.
Dame de Perpétuel Secours	France	The fishing vessel was wrecked on the coast of Iceland. Her crew survived.
Elvin Keplin	Germany	The ship was abandoned in the Atlantic Ocean.
Forsoget	Flag unknown	The derelict schooner was taken in to Rønne, Denmark.
Fortuna	Denmark	The schooner ran aground at Lowestoft, Suffolk, United Kingdom. She was on a voyage from Danzig, Germany to Lowestoft. She was refloated and taken in to Lowestoft in a severely leaky condition.
Francesca	United Kingdom	The ship was wrecked at East London, Cape Colony.
Holyrood	Flag unknown	The steamship sank whilst on a voyage from Saigon, French Indochina to Singapore, Straits Settlements.
Johanne Augusta	Flag unknown	The schooner capsized in the Skaggerak (56°30′N 4°43′E).
John Balsey	United Kingdom	The ship ran aground at Philadelphia, Pennsylvania. She was on a voyage from Cárdenas, Cuba to New York. She was refloated and found to be severely leaky.
Lizzie	United Kingdom	The ship was driven ashore on "Cardos Island". She was on a voyage from Antwerp, Belgium to the Rio Grande.
Mallard	United Kingdom	The barque was abandoned off The Lizard, Cornwall before 3 May. Six of her crew were rescued by Aberfoyle (United Kingdom). Mallard was towed in to Plymouth, Devon on 5 May by the tug Secret (United Kingdom).
Marmion	United Kingdom	The waterlogged and abandoned steamship ran aground 4 nautical miles (7.4 km) off the Swedish coast.
Napoleon	Norway	The brig was wrecked of Båstad, Sweden. Her crew were rescued. She was on a voyage from Boulogne, Pas-de-Calais, France to Helsingør, Denmark.
Novara	United Kingdom	The full-rigged ship was destroyed by fire in the Pacific Ocean. Her crew took to three boats; those in two of the boats were rescued by the barque Enrique Tevodoro (Germany). Four crew in the third boat were reported missing. Novara was on a voyage from South Shields, County Durham to San Francisco, California, United States.
Olive Branch	United Kingdom	The smack foundered in the North Sea with the loss of all hands.
Othello	United Kingdom	The steamship was driven ashore at Constantinople, Ottoman Empire. She was on a voyage from Hull, Yorkshire to Odesa, Russia. She was refloated.
Peders Minde	Denmark	The schooner was driven ashore in the Ätran.
Perveche	Flag unknown	The ship was wrecked at Saint-Louis, Senegal. She was on a voyage from Pensacola, Florida, United States to Saint-Louis.
Recovery	United Kingdom	The tug ran aground in the Clyde at Greenock, Renfrewshire. She was refloated and taken in to Greenock.
Roseneath	United Kingdom	The barque foundered at sea. Eight of the thirteen people on board were rescued by the steamship Mardi (Germany). Five crew in a pinnace were reported missing. Roseneath was on a voyage from Mejillones, Chile to Liverpool.
Sigtruder	Denmark	The schooner departed from Copenhagen for Reykjavík, Iceland. No further trace, reported missing.
Skulda	Norway	The ship was towed in to Portland, Dorset, United Kingdom in a capsized condition.
Star of India	United Kingdom	The ship was beached at Valparaíso, Chile, where she was wrecked. Her crew were rescued. SHe was on a voyage from San Francisco, California, United States to Queenstown, County Cork.
Thorbecke	Netherlands	The ship collided with the steamship Cadoxton (United Kingdom) and was severely damaged. Thorbecke was on a voyage from Amsterdam, North Holland to Batavia, Netherlands East Indies. She put back to Amsterdam.
Vindobala	United Kingdom	The steamship was driven ashore in the Gulf of Suez. She was on a voyage from South Shields to Bombay, India.
10th June	Germany	The barque was abandoned in the North Sea.
