= Eastchurch railway station =

Disused railway station in Kent, England

Coordinates: 51.3981°N 0.8526°E

Eastchurch
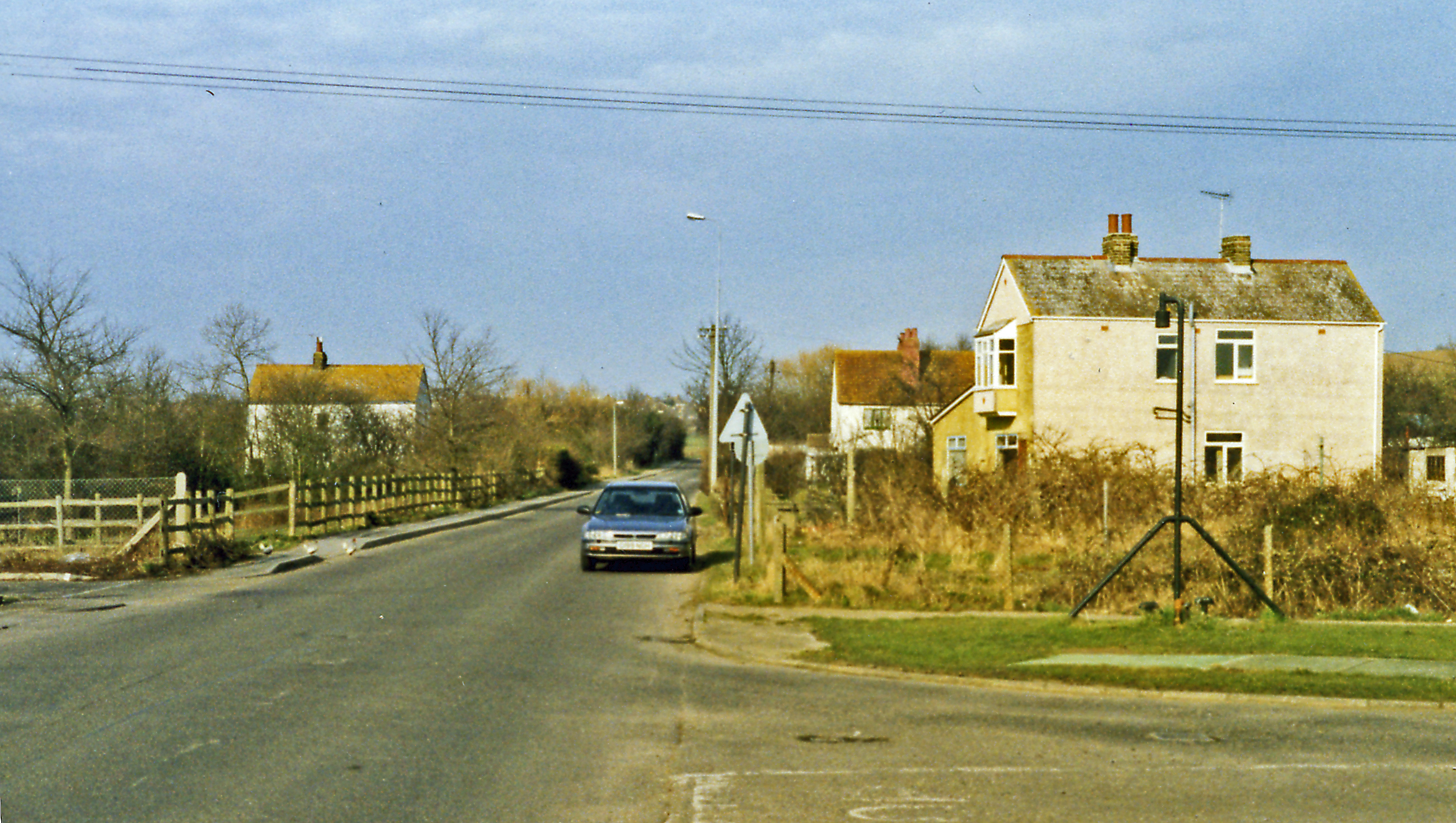
- Site of the station in 1995

General information
- Location: Sheppey, Swale; England
- Platforms: 1

Other information
- Status: Disused

History
- Original company: Sheppey Light Railway
- Pre-grouping: South Eastern & Chatham Railway
- Post-grouping: Southern Railway

Key dates
- 1 Aug 1901: Opened
- 4 Dec 1950: Closed
Location

Eastchurch is a disused railway station serving Eastchurch on the Isle of Sheppey. It opened in 1901 and closed in 1950.

Preceding station	Disused railways	Following station
Brambledown Halt	Sheppey Light Railway	Harty Road Halt
