= Sheerness East railway station =

Disused railway station in Kent, England

Coordinates: 51.4272°N 0.7744°E

Sheerness East

General information
- Location: Sheppey, Swale; England
- Platforms: 1

Other information
- Status: Disused

History
- Original company: Sheppey Light Railway
- Pre-grouping: South Eastern and Chatham Railway
- Post-grouping: Southern Railway

Key dates
- 1 Aug 1901: Opened
- 4 Dec 1950: Closed
Location

Sheerness East is a disused railway station serving Sheerness on the Isle of Sheppey. It opened in 1901 and closed in 1950. The site of the station is now covered by housing.

Preceding station	Disused railways	Following station
Queenborough	Sheppey Light Railway	East Minster
