= East Minster railway station =

Disused railway station in Kent, England

Coordinates: 51.4199°N 0.7974°E

East Minster
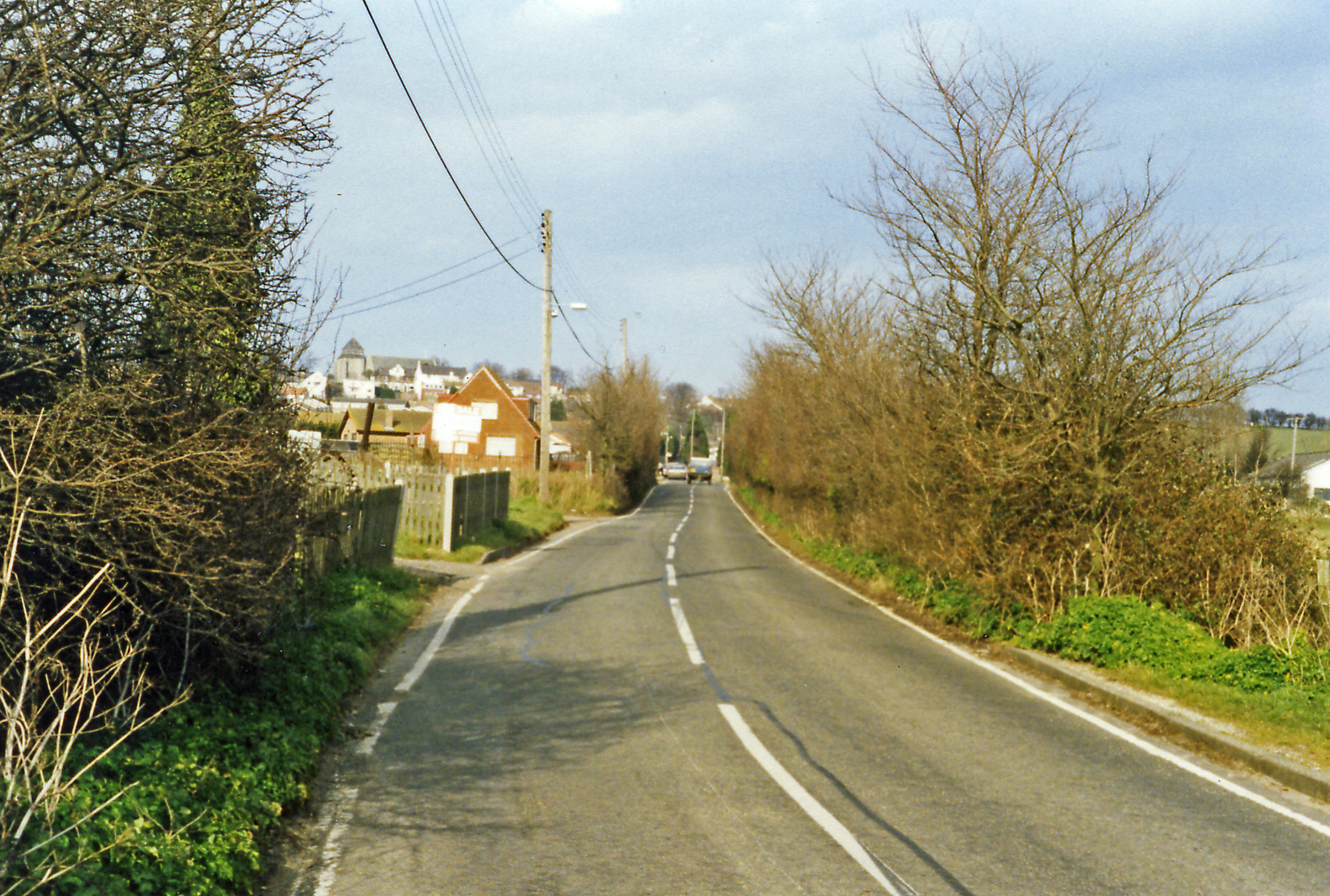
- Site of the station in 1995

General information
- Location: Sheppey, Swale; England
- Platforms: 1

Other information
- Status: Disused

History
- Original company: Sheppey Light Railway
- Pre-grouping: South Eastern & Chatham Railway
- Post-grouping: Southern Railway

Key dates
- 1902: Opened
- 4 Dec 1950: Closed
Location

East Minster is a disused railway station serving Minster on the Isle of Sheppey. It opened in 1902 and closed in 1950.

Preceding station	Disused railways	Following station
Sheerness East	Sheppey Light Railway	Minster on Sea
