= QBR =

QBR may refer to:

- Total quarterback rating, an American football performance measurement
- Quins-Bobbies Rugby Club, in South Africa
- Queenborough railway station, North Kent, National Rail station code
- QBR: The Black Book Review, later merged into the Black Issues Book Review
- Quarterly business review, a business process
