= West Franklin =

West Franklin may refer to:

- West Franklin, Indiana
- West Franklin, New Hampshire, village in the city of Franklin
- West Franklin Township, Pennsylvania
