= Call in =

Call in may refer to:

- Phone-in
- 'Call-in', (or 'called in'), referring to a planning decision process being passed to a higher authority
  - In New Zealand, a function available under the Resource Management Act 1991
  - In the United Kingdom, see Development control in the United Kingdom
