= Minster on Sea railway station =

Disused railway station in Kent, England

Coordinates: 51.4172°N 0.8092°E

Minster on Sea

General information
- Location: Sheppey, Swale; England
- Platforms: 1

Other information
- Status: Disused

History
- Original company: Sheppey Light Railway
- Pre-grouping: South Eastern & Chatham Railway
- Post-grouping: Southern Railway

Key dates
- 1 Aug 1901: Opened as Minster (Sheppey)
- 1 May 1906: Renamed; Minster On Sea
- 4 Dec 1950: Closed
Location

Minster on Sea is a disused railway station that served Minster on the Isle of Sheppey. It opened in 1901 and closed in 1950.

Preceding station	Disused railways	Following station
East Minster	Sheppey Light Railway	Brambledown Halt
