= Queenborough railway station =

Railway station in Kent, England

Coordinates: 51°24′56.31″N 0°44′59.08″E

Queenborough
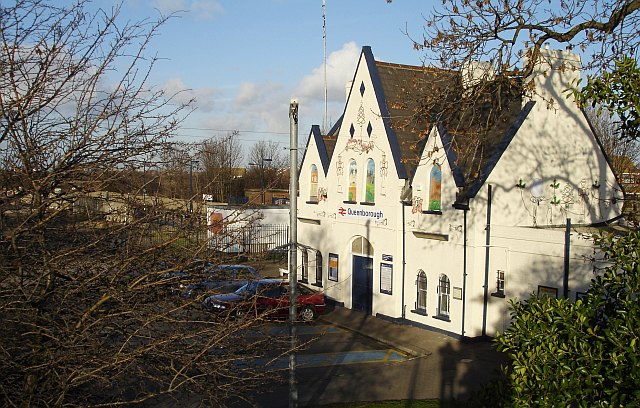

General information
- Location: Queenborough, Swale; England
- Grid reference: TQ913721
- Managed by: Southeastern
- Platforms: 2

Other information
- Station code: QBR
- Classification: DfT category E

History
- Original company: Sittingbourne and Sheerness Railway; London, Chatham and Dover Railway
- Pre-grouping: South Eastern and Chatham Railway
- Post-grouping: Southern Railway

Key dates
- 19 July 1860: Opened

Passengers
- 2020/21: ▼57,806
- 2021/22: ▲0.150 million
- 2022/23: ▼0.140 million
- 2023/24: ▲0.179 million
- 2024/25: ▲0.196 million
Location
Notes
- Passenger statistics from the Office of Rail and Road

Queenborough railway station is on the Sheerness Line, on the Isle of Sheppey in northern Kent, and serves the town of Queenborough. It is 49 miles 22 chains (79.3 km) down the line from London Victoria. Train services are provided by Southeastern.

== History ==
Queenborough was opened on 19 July 1860 by the Sittingbourne and Sheerness Railway (S&SR), a nominally independent company which had powers to construct a 7.125-mile (11.467-kilometre) branch line from Sittingbourne across the River Swale to a terminus near the entrance of Sheerness Dockyard. The line was worked from the outset by the London, Chatham and Dover Railway which absorbed the S&SR in 1876.

On 15 May 1876, Queenborough became a junction station with the opening of a short spur to Queenborough Pier to serve steam ship services. A second line was added on 1 August 1901 with the opening of the Sheppey Light Railway, an 8.75-mile (14.08-kilometre) light railway across the Isle of Sheppey to Leysdown. There was no direct connection with the Sheerness Line and trains for Leysdown departed from the outer face of a newly constructed island platform at Queenborough. An iron footbridge was erected at the southern end of the platforms to facilitate passengers changing between main line and branch services. Services on the Sheppey Light Railway ceased as of 4 December 1950.

Until the opening of Swale Halt in 1922, Queenborough was the only intermediate station on the Sheerness Line. The imposing two-storey station building has a strong Victorian character with its high-pitched gables and round-headed sash windows. The building is in a similar style to Lymington Town railway station which dates from the same period, a resemblance which may be explained by the fact that the construction of both the Lymington branch line and the S&SR was overseen by John Cass Birkinshaw who was replaced as engineer on the S&SR after the company's directors blamed him for the line's slow construction.

A wooden waiting shelter was provided on the Upside but not on the Downside. The station also had a sizeable goods shed and goods yard on the Up side adjacent to the main station building. Sidings on the Down side served Sheerness Steelworks and provided connections for MCD car traffic and shipbreaking activities. There was a signal box on the Up side which was located at the point where the Sheppey branch curved away to the east; this closed on 24 May 1959. By this time, the goods shed had already been demolished although the goods yard remained open until 16 August 1971. The line through Queenborough was electrified and the platforms were lengthened in 1959 as part of phase I of the Kent Coast Electrification.

By 1993, much of the station building was no longer in use and only the booking office was staffed on weekdays until mid-morning.

== Facilities ==
On Platform 2 (Sheerness bound), there is a substantial and historic two-storey building which contains a ticket office on the ground floor. Outside of these hours, tickets can be purchased via a ticket machine, located by the sidegate on Platform 2. The station also has a car park, waiting shelters and help points.

== Passenger volume ==
Passenger Volume at Queenborough
	2002–03	2004–05	2005–06	2006–07	2007–08	2008–09	2009–10	2010–11	2011–12	2012–13	2013–14	2014–15	2015–16	2016–17	2017–18	2018–19	2019–20	2020–21	2021–22	2022–23
Entries and exits	169,034	162,234	179,418	166,631	167,201	163,596	150,504	152,522	141,800	120,008	119,210	118,204	123,064	153,166	175,994	185,690	189,514	57,806	149,976	140,170

The statistics cover twelve month periods that start in April.

== Services ==
The typical off-peak service is one train per hour in each direction between Sheerness-on-Sea and Sittingbourne, from where connections are available to London Victoria, London St Pancras International, Dover Priory and Ramsgate. During the peak hours, the service is increased to two trains per hour in each direction.

Preceding station	National Rail	Following station
Swale	Southeastern Sheerness Line	Sheerness-on-Sea
	Historical railways	
Swale Line and station open	South Eastern and Chatham Railway Sheerness Line	Sheerness Dockyard Line and station closed
Swale Line and station open	South Eastern and Chatham Railway Sheerness Line	Queenborough Pier Line and station closed
Kings Ferry Bridge North Halt Line open, station closed	South Eastern and Chatham Railway Sheerness Line	Queenborough Pier Line and station closed
Kings Ferry Bridge North Halt Line open, station closed	South Eastern and Chatham Railway Sheerness Line	Sheerness-on-Sea Line and station open
	Disused railways	
Terminus	Southern Railway Sheppey Light Railway	Sheerness East Line and station closed

== Bibliography ==
- Awdry, Christopher (1990). Encyclopaedia of British Railway Companies. Sparkford: Patrick Stephens Ltd. ISBN 1-8526-0049-7. OCLC 19514063. CN 8983.
- Body, Geoffrey (1989) [1984]. Railways of the Southern Region. Patrick Stephens Ltd. ISBN 1-85260-297-X.
- Butt, R. V. J. (October 1995). The Directory of Railway Stations: details every public and private passenger station, halt, platform and stopping place, past and present (1st ed.). Sparkford: Patrick Stephens Ltd. ISBN 978-1-85260-508-7. OCLC 60251199. OL 11956311M.
- Clinker, C.R. (October 1978). Clinker's Register of Closed Passenger Stations and Goods Depots in England, Scotland and Wales 1830-1977. Bristol, Avon: Avon-AngliA Publications & Services. ISBN 0-905466-19-5.
- Course, Edwin (1974). The Railways of Southern England: Secondary and Branch Lines. London: B.T. Batsford. ISBN 0-7134-2835-X.
- Dendy Marshall, C. F.; Kidner, R. W. (1982) [1963]. History of the Southern Railway (Revised ed.). Shepperton: Ian Allan. ISBN 0-7110-0059-X.
- Gray, Adrian (1984). The London, Chatham and Dover Railway. Rainham: Meresborough Books. ISBN 978-0-905270-88-3.
- Hart, Brian (1992). The Sheppey Light Railway. Didcot: Wild Swan Publications. ISBN 1-874103-09-7.
- Mitchell, Vic; Smith, Keith (July 1993). Branch Lines Around Sheerness. Midhurst: Middleton Press. ISBN 1-8737-9316-2.
- Moody, G.T. (1979) [1957]. Southern Electric 1909-1979. Shepperton, Surrey: Ian Allan. ISBN 0-7110-0924-4.
- Quick, Michael (2009) [2001]. Railway passenger stations in Great Britain: a chronology (4th ed.). Oxford: Railway & Canal Historical Society. ISBN 978-0-901461-57-5. OCLC 612226077.
- White, H.P. (1987) [1976]. Forgotten Railways: South-East England. Vol. 6. Newton Abbot, Devon: David & Charles. ISBN 978-0-946537-37-2.
- White, H.P. (1992) [1961]. A Regional History of the Railways of Great Britain: Southern England. Vol. 2). Nairn, Scotland: David St John Thomas. ISBN 0-946537-77-1.
