= Harty Road Halt railway station =

Disused railway station in England

Coordinates: 51.3978°N 0.8847°E

Harty Road halt

General information
- Location: Sheppey, Swale; England
- Platforms: 1

Other information
- Status: Disused

History
- Original company: Sheppey Light Railway
- Pre-grouping: South Eastern & Chatham Railway
- Post-grouping: Southern Railway

Key dates
- Mar 1905: Opened
- 4 Dec 1950: Closed
Location

Harty Road Halt is a disused railway station between Eastchurch and Leysdown-on-Sea. It opened in 1905 and closed in 1950.

Preceding station	Disused railways	Following station
Eastchurch	Sheppey Light Railway	Leysdown
