= Saint Philip, Indiana =

- Unincorporated community
- Location within Indiana Location within the United States
- Coordinates: 37°59′13″N 87°42′57″W
- Country: United States
- State: Indiana
- County: Posey
- Township: Marrs
- Elevation: 499 ft (152 m)
- Time zone: UTC-6 (Central (CST))
  - Summer (DST): UTC-5 (CDT)
- ZIP code: 47620
- Area codes: 812, 930
- GNIS feature ID: 449726

Saint Philip is an unincorporated community in Marrs Township, Posey County, in the U.S. state of Indiana.

== History ==
A post office was established at Saint Philip in 1872, and remained in operation until it was discontinued in 1902. The community took its name from a local church. Saint Philip was originally built up chiefly by German Catholics.
