= Leysdown railway station =

Disused railway station in Kent, England

Coordinates: 51.3989°N 0.9212°E

Leysdown
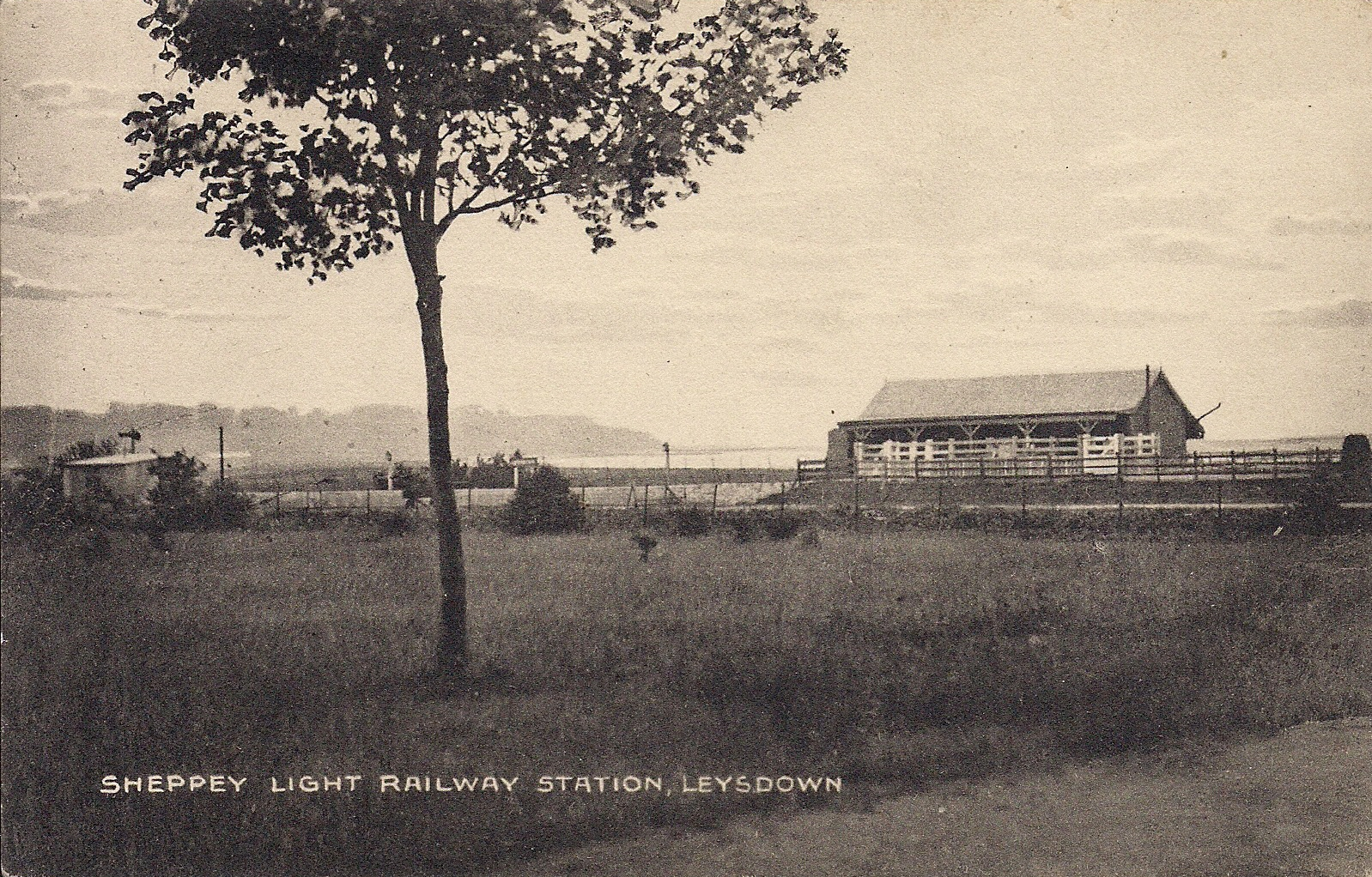

General information
- Location: Leysdown, Swale; England
- Platforms: 1

Other information
- Status: Disused

History
- Original company: Sheppey Light Railway
- Pre-grouping: South Eastern & Chatham Railway
- Post-grouping: Southern Railway

Key dates
- 1 Aug 1901: Opened
- 4 Dec 1950: Closed
Location

Leysdown is a disused railway station in Leysdown-on-Sea. It opened in 1901 and closed in 1950. There are no remains of the station.

Preceding station	Disused railways	Following station
Harty Road Halt	Sheppey Light Railway	Terminus
