= Richard Caborn =

British Labour Party politician (born 1943)

The Right Honourable Richard Caborn
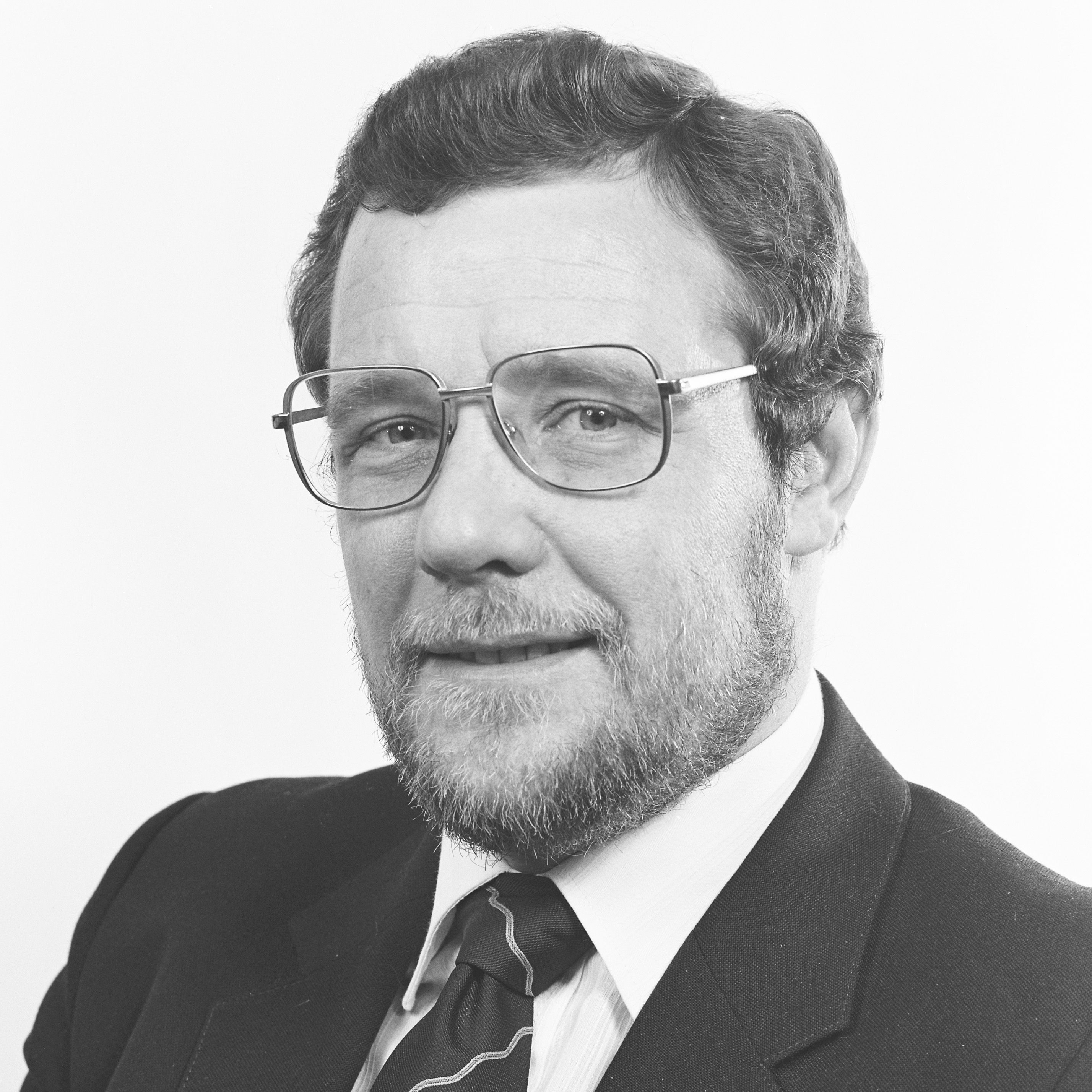
- Caborn in 1979

Minister for Sport
- In office 7 June 2001 – 28 June 2007
- Prime Minister: Tony Blair
- Preceded by: Kate Hoey
- Succeeded by: Gerry Sutcliffe

Minister of State for Trade
- In office 28 July 1999 – 7 June 2001
- Prime Minister: Tony Blair
- Preceded by: Brian Wilson
- Succeeded by: The Baroness Symons

Minister of State for Regions, Regeneration and Planning
- In office 2 May 1997 – 28 July 1999
- Prime Minister: Tony Blair
- Preceded by: Office established
- Succeeded by: Nick Raynsford
Parliamentary offices
Member of Parliament for Sheffield Central
In office 10 June 1983 – 12 April 2010
Preceded by	Constituency established
Succeeded by	Paul Blomfield
Member of the European Parliament for Sheffield
In office 7 June 1979 – 14 June 1984
Preceded by	Constituency established
Succeeded by	Bob Cryer

Personal details
- Born: Richard George Caborn; 6 October 1943 (age 82) Sheffield, West Riding of Yorkshire, England
- Party: Labour
- Spouse: Margaret Hayes
- Education: Sheffield Polytechnic
- Occupation: Member of Parliament

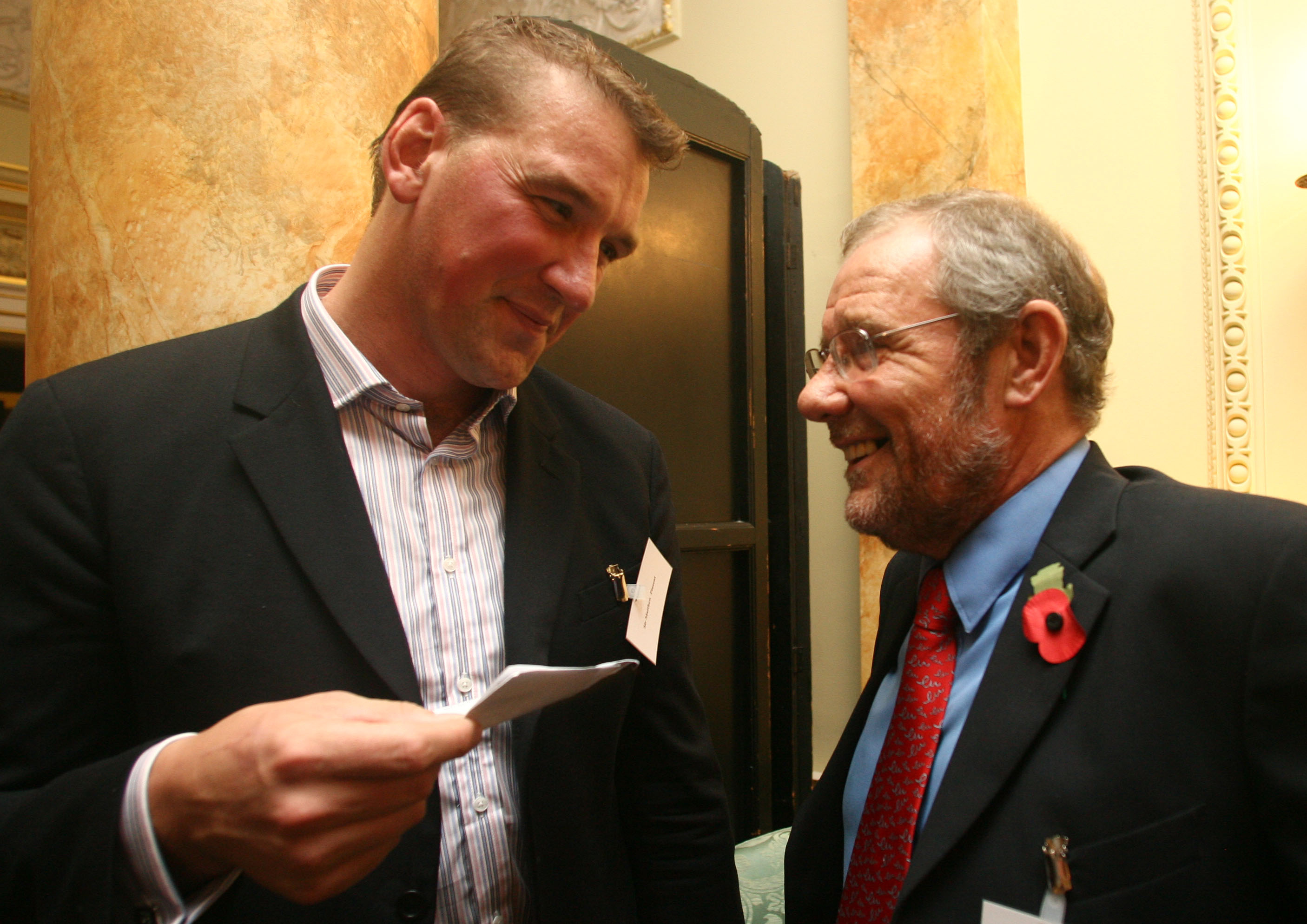
Caborn (right) in 2005.

Richard George Caborn (born 6 October 1943) is a British politician who served as Minister of Sport from 2001 to 2007 and later as the prime minister's ambassador for England's 2018 FIFA World Cup bid. He previously served as a junior minister in the Department of Environment, Transport and the Regions and Department of Trade and Industry. A member of the Labour Party, he was Member of Parliament (MP) for Sheffield Central from 1983 to 2010.

== Early life ==
Richard Caborn was born in Sheffield and was educated at the Hurlfield Secondary Modern Boys School until 1958 (now Sheffield Springs Academy) on East Bank Road, Intake in Sheffield; Granville College of Further Education (now Castle College, part of Sheffield College); and Sheffield Polytechnic (now Sheffield Hallam University), where he qualified as an engineer. He began an engineering apprenticeship in 1959 and became a convenor of shop stewards at Firth Brown in 1967 where he worked as a fitter. He was elected as the Vice-President of Sheffield Trades Council between 1968 and 1979. He became a governor of the BBC for three years in 1975. He is a member of the Co-operative Party and of Amicus (formerly AEEU).

== Parliamentary career ==
In 1979, he was elected as a Member of the European Parliament for Sheffield, where he remained until 1984. He contested the new parliamentary seat of Sheffield Central at the 1983 general election, following the decision to retire of the Labour MP for Sheffield Park and former Cabinet member Fred Mulley, and was elected somewhat easily with a majority of 16,790, and remained the MP there until 2010.

Caborn joined the frontbench under Neil Kinnock in 1988 when he became an opposition spokesman on Trade and Industry, becoming a spokesman of Regional Affairs in 1990. Following the 1992 general election he became the chairman of the Trade and Industry Select committee where he served until 1995 when he became an opposition spokesman on the Lord Chancellor's Department. Following Labour's return to power at the 1997 general election, he entered the government of Tony Blair as the Minister of State at the Department of Environment, Transport and the Regions, in which role he was closely involved in establishing the English Regional Development Agencies. He was also a strong supporter of English regional government, but after negative responses from referendums in the north of England in 2004 this was dropped by government. He then moved with the same position at the Department of Trade and Industry in 1999. He became a Member of the Privy Council in 1999, and from the 2001 general election until 2007 he served as the Minister of Sport. In relation to the Wembley Stadium rebuilding project, he announced in October 2005: "They say the Cup Final will be there, barring six feet of snow or something like that".

Caborn was seen as a close ally of John Prescott, running his campaigns for the deputy leadership of the Labour Party in 1992 (whilst supporting Bryan Gould for leader). He also ran Prescott's campaign for both deputy and leader in 1994. He is a former Bennite, and was very active on South Africa issues, being pro-Mandela and anti-apartheid; he ran concerts in support of the African National Congress. He was an active supporter of Arthur Scargill during the 1984–1985 miners' strike.

In March 2003, Caborn supported Tony Blair in voting for the controversial Iraq War. On 30 December 2005, Caborn publicly announced his support for capped wages in British football.

On 28 June 2007, it was announced he would step down as Minister for Sport to become the prime minister's ambassador for Britain's unsuccessful 2018 FIFA World Cup bid. In this role, he lobbied FIFA, oversaw the appointment of the bid's senior team and liaised between ministers and the Football Association.

Caborn announced on 13 September 2007 that he would stand down at the next general election.

Caborn is a director of Nuclear Management Partners, which manages the Sellafield nuclear complex, a consultant to AMEC, a construction firm in the nuclear industry, and also a consultant to the Fitness Industry Association.

In March 2010, Caborn faced accusations in The Sunday Times that he accepted money in exchange for influencing policy, implicating him in the "Lobbygate" affair. On 9 December 2010 he, Stephen Byers, and Geoff Hoon were banned from Parliament. The Standards and Privileges Committee banned him for six months whilst Byers received two years and Hoon five years.

== Caborn principles ==
The Caborn principles, a list of criteria used by a Secretary of State in deciding whether to use their power to call in a planning application, are named after Caborn, who as Planning Minister first established them in June 1999.

European Parliament
New constituency	Member of the European Parliament for Sheffield; 1979–1984	Succeeded by Bob Cryer
Parliament of the United Kingdom
New constituency	Member of Parliament for Sheffield Central; 1983–2010	Succeeded by Paul Blomfield
Political offices
Preceded by John Gummer	Minister for the Environment; 1997–1999	Succeeded by Nick Raynsford
Preceded by Stephen Byers	Minister for Trade; 1999–2001	Succeeded by Patricia Hewitt
Preceded by Kate Hoey	Minister for Sport; 2001–2007	Succeeded by Gerry Sutcliffe
