= Sheerness Dockyard railway station =

Former railway station in England

Sheerness Dockyard Sheerness (1860-83)
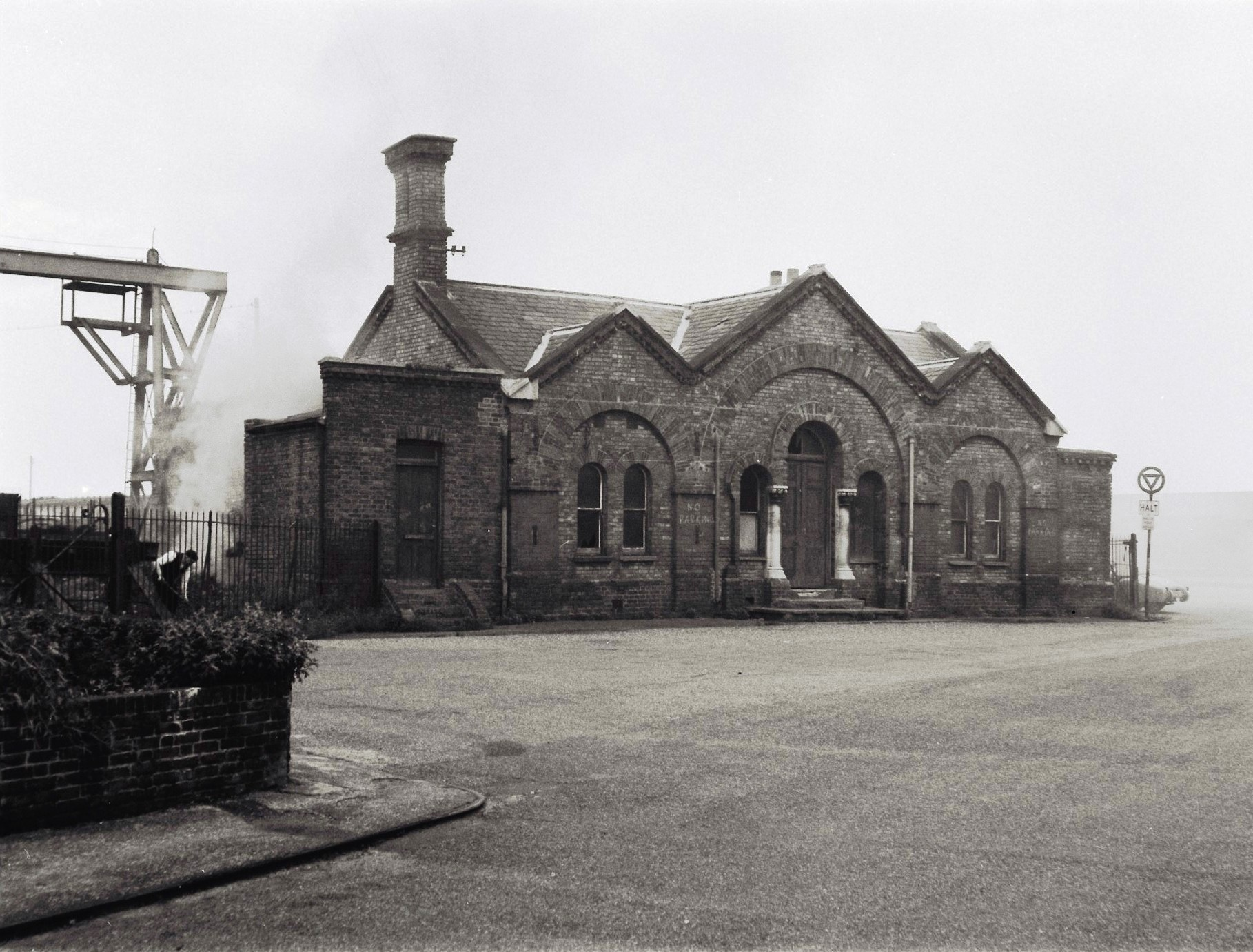
- Sheerness Dockyard station, 1960

General information
- Location: Sheerness-on-Sea; England
- Coordinates: 51°26′17″N 0°44′58″E
- Grid reference: TQ 912 746
- Platforms: 2

Other information
- Status: Disused

History
- Original company: Sittingbourne & Sheerness Railway Company
- Pre-grouping: London, Chatham and Dover Railway
- Post-grouping: Southern Railway

Key dates
- 19 July 1860: Opened
- 1 June 1883: Renamed Sheerness Dockyard
- 2 January 1922: closed for passengers
- 6 May 1963: Closed for freight
Location

Sheerness Dockyard railway station was the original terminus of the Sheerness line. It was built by the Sittingbourne & Sheerness Railway and opened in 1860. The station closed for passengers in 1922, closed for freight in 1963 and the buildings were demolished in 1971.

== History ==
The station opened with the Sheerness line on 19 July 1860, which was built by the Sittingbourne & Sheerness Railway (S&SR) and taken over by the London Chatham & Dover Railway in 1876. It was originally called simply Sheerness, and stood not only close to the Royal Navy Dockyard, but also to the foot of Sheerness pier and the town's quay. It occupied a cramped site, formerly part of the Ordnance Well House that supplied the garrison's water, between the Navy Dockyard's defensive moat and dockyard workers' housing. There were two platforms, later linked at the terminal end by a fan table, also known as a sector plate, thus allowing the release of locomotives. Other facilities included a single-road engine shed, turntable and goods shed. The engine shed was later extended to a longer, two-road structure, and a larger 45 ft turntable replaced the original 42 ft one. An over-track signal box was also added by 1875. A narrow-gauge railway originally ran from the end of the pier to the station, most likely for baggage transfers and worked by manpower.

Although conveniently sited, in an area known as Blue Town, for access to the Royal Navy's Sheerness Dockyard, the station was some way from the civilian part of the town. The station building was damaged by a gale which blew from 29 October to 1 November 1863. Further damage was caused when HMS Bulwark exploded in the River Medway nearby in November 1914. Falling debris struck the station's overall roof, causing its collapse and replacement by simple timber platform canopies.

On 1 June 1883, a short, U-shaped branch was opened from the original terminus to a new station convenient for the resort part of the town, known as Mile Town. The new station took the name Sheerness-on-Sea and the original station was renamed Sheerness Dockyard. Sheerness-On-Sea was, in fact, on the site originally proposed for its terminus by the S&SR. It's likely that the Admiralty was instrumental in changing the first terminus's location to its own advantage, after first mooting a spur to its dockyard from the original alignment. All trains to Sheerness-On-Sea had to reverse at Sheerness Dockyard station, so it was probably about this time that the fan table was installed, and the latter station's platforms lengthened. This improvement in facilities was spurred by competition from the South Eastern Railway's branch line to Port Victoria, on the opposite bank of the River Medway, from which passengers could reach Sheerness by ferry: an overall shorter route.

Sheerness Naval Dockyard had an internal standard gauge railway system from c.1870, but it was not until 1904 that it was connected to the railway at the station. It was closed on 2 January 1922, when a direct connection for passenger services was provided to Sheerness-on-Sea from Queenborough.

The Royal Navy left Sheerness in 1960 and the dockyard closed. Sheerness Dockyard station closed on 6 May 1963 although the 1904 dockyard siding remained in use as a private siding until 8 March 1965. It was not officially taken out of use until October 1968. The station buildings were demolished in 1971. The site was used for sidings serving the adjacent Sheerness Steelworks and is now a storage area for cars imported via Sheerness docks (the former Royal Navy dockyard). The dockyard siding, its rails inset into granite setts, has survived, as has the pier-master's house and the pier approach road.

== Services ==
Initially there were five passenger trains daily, rising to ten daily and eight on Sunday in June 1869. Services in February 1890 were nine daily and three on Sundays. By July 1907 there were nine trains daily and seven on Sundays, rising to thirteen daily and nine on Sundays in July 1914.

Preceding station	Disused railways	Following station
Terminus	London, Chatham and Dover Railway; Sheerness line	Queenborough
