= Heusler, Indiana =

- Unincorporated community
- Location within Indiana Location within the United States
- Coordinates: 37°56′01″N 87°42′46″W
- Country: United States
- State: Indiana
- County: Posey
- Township: Marrs
- Elevation: 469 ft (143 m)
- Time zone: UTC-6 (Central (CST))
  - Summer (DST): UTC-5 (CDT)
- ZIP code: 47712
- Area codes: 812, 930
- GNIS feature ID: 436079

Heusler is an unincorporated community in Marrs Township, Posey County, in the U.S. state of Indiana.

== History ==
A post office was established at Heusler in 1893, and remained in operation until it was discontinued in 1903. Ernest H. C. Heusler served as postmaster and gave the community its name.
