= Marrs Township, Posey County, Indiana =

Marrs Township Posey County
- Township
- Coordinates: 37°56′47″N 87°45′21″W
- Country: United States
- State: Indiana
- County: Posey

Government
  - Type: Indiana township

Area
  - Total: 52.12 sq mi (134.98 km^{2})
  - Land: 51.5 sq mi (133.5 km^{2})
  - Water: 0.57 sq mi (1.48 km^{2})
- Elevation: 436 ft (133 m)

Population (2020)
  - Total: 5,385
  - Density: 94.5/sq mi (36.47/km^{2})
- FIPS code: 18-47250
- GNIS feature ID: 453614

Marrs Township is one of ten townships in Posey County, Indiana. At the 2000 census, its population was 4,868. By the 2020 census it had risen to 5,385.

Historical population
Census	Pop.	Note	%±
1890	2,066		—
1900	2,199		6.4%
1910	2,008		−8.7%
1920	1,736		−13.5%
1930	1,758		1.3%
1940	1,900		8.1%
1950	2,006		5.6%
1960	2,500		24.6%
1970	2,931		17.2%
1980	4,182		42.7%
1990	4,462		6.7%
2000	4,868		9.1%
2010	5,177		6.3%
2020	5,388		4.1%
Source: US Decennial Census

== History ==
Marrs Township was organized in 1817. The township was named for Samuel R. Marrs, a pioneer settler and afterward county commissioner.

== Demographics ==
=== 2020 Census ===
At the 2020 census there were 5,385 people, 2,094 housing units and 1,949 households residing in the township. The population density was 104.6 inhabitants per square mile. The racial makeup was 94% White, 1% African American, 0% Native American, 1% Asian, 0% Pacific Islander, 2% from other races, and 2% from two or more races. Hispanic or Latino of any race was 0% of the population.

Of the family households, 76% were married couples, 5% were a male householder with no spouse, and 5% were a female householder with no spouse. The average household had 2.8 people.

The median age was 40.1, 26% of people were under the age of 18, and 18% were 65 years of age or older. Of the residents none spoke a language other than English at home, and 1.3% were born outside the United States, 13% in Europe and 87% in Asia.

The median income for a household in the township was $119,933. 5.9% of the population were military veterans, and 34.2% had a batchelors degree or higher. In the CDP 9.9% of the population was below the poverty line, including 10% of those under age 18 and 12% of those age 65 or over.

== Adjacent townships ==
- Indiana
  - Posey County
    - Black Township (West)
    - Lynn Township (Single Point - Northwest)
    - Robinson Township (North)
  - Vanderburgh County
    - German Township (Single Point - Northeast)
    - Perry Township (East)
- Kentucky
  - Henderson County
    - Corydon District (South)

== Unincorporated places ==
- Caborn
- Heusler
- Marrs Center
- St. Philip
- West Franklin

== Education ==
It is within the Metropolitan School District of Mt. Vernon, which operates Mount Vernon High School.
