= Lynn Township, Posey County, Indiana =

Lynn Township Posey County
- Township
- Coordinates: 38°02′49″N 87°55′34″W
- Country: United States
- State: Indiana
- County: Posey

Government
  - Type: Indiana township

Area
  - Total: 44.71 sq mi (115.79 km^{2})
  - Land: 43.63 sq mi (112.99 km^{2})
  - Water: 1.1 sq mi (2.8 km^{2})
- Elevation: 433 ft (132 m)

Population (2020)
  - Total: 810
  - Density: 19/sq mi (7.2/km^{2})
- FIPS code: 18-45450
- GNIS feature ID: 453585

Lynn Township is one of ten townships in Posey County, Indiana. As of the 2020 census, its population was 810.

Historical population
Census	Pop.	Note	%±
1890	1,471		—
1900	1,382		−6.1%
1910	1,297		−6.2%
1920	1,047		−19.3%
1930	967		−7.6%
1940	912		−5.7%
1950	825		−9.5%
1960	702		−14.9%
1970	649		−7.5%
1980	891		37.3%
1990	991		11.2%
2000	945		−4.6%
2010	895		−5.3%
2020	810		−9.5%
Source: US Decennial Census

== History ==
Lynn Township was organized in 1817. The township bears the name of Dan Lynn, a state legislator.

== Adjacent Townships ==
- Indiana
  - Posey County
    - Black Township (South)
    - Center Township (Northeast)
    - Harmony Township (North)
    - Marrs Township (Single Point)
    - Robinson Township (East)
- Illinois
  - White County, Illinois
    - Emma Township (Southwest)
    - Phillips Township (Northwest)

== Unincorporated Places ==
- Savah
- Solitude
- Springfield

== Education ==
It is within the Metropolitan School District of Mt. Vernon, which operates Mount Vernon High School.
