= Metropolitan School District of Mt. Vernon =

School district in Indiana

The Metropolitan School District of Mt. Vernon, Indiana, also known as simply the MSD of Mt. Vernon or MSDMV, is the school corporation serving the City of Mt. Vernon and southern Posey County and is the larger of two school districts in the county.

The townships covered by this district include Black, Lynn, Marrs, and Point. The only incorporated community is Mount Vernon, by far the largest community in the county.

The school district comprises five schools, Marrs Elementary, Farmersville Elementary, West Elementary, Mt. Vernon Junior High, Mt. Vernon High school. The district is led by Dr. Matthew Thompson

== History ==
In 1949 the Indiana Legislature passed a law that allowed school consolidation. By 1953 there had been proposals in Posey County to establish metropolitan school district systems. By 1953 the Rural School Improvement Council (RISC) was promoting such a consolidation for Black, Marrs, and Lynn townships, and a referendum on such was scheduled for May 4, 1954.

Previously Posey County had a county school system, but it transitioned, after a referendum on October 1, 1956, determined it would do so. By December 1956, the consolidations of the school systems into Mt. Vernon schools had occurred. The referendum was held because there were people opposed to the school district consolidations who submitted official documents opposing them.

Point Township was not a part of the October 1956 vote. In November 1956, Point Township joined MSD of Mount Vernon, because the board of the township asked to join.

== Schools ==
- Mount Vernon Senior High
- Mount Vernon Junior High School
- Farmersville Elementary School
- Marrs Elementary School
- West Elementary School

== Other Facilities ==
- Southern Indiana Career & Technical Center
- Hedges Central Community Center & Offices

== Nearby districts ==
- Evansville-Vanderburgh School Corporation
- Metropolitan School District of North Posey County
- Union County Public Schools, Kentucky
- Carmi-White County Public Schools, Illinois
  - Carmi-White County High School
