= Solitude, Indiana =

- Unincorporated community
- Location within Indiana Location within the United States
- Coordinates: 38°00′53″N 87°53′56″W
- Country: United States
- State: Indiana
- County: Posey
- Township: Lynn
- Elevation: 374 ft (114 m)
- Time zone: UTC-6 (Central (CST))
  - Summer (DST): UTC-5 (CDT)
- ZIP code: 47620
- Area codes: 812, 930
- GNIS feature ID: 443755

Solitude is an unincorporated community in Lynn Township, Posey County, in the U.S. state of Indiana.

== History ==
A post office was established at Solitude in 1858, and remained in operation until 1917. The community was named for its quiet character.

== Geography ==
Solitude is located on Indiana State Road 69 north of Mount Vernon.
