= Springfield, Posey County, Indiana =

Springfield, Indiana
- Unincorporated community
- Location within Indiana Location within the United States
- Coordinates: 38°02′33″N 87°52′13″W
- Country: United States
- State: Indiana
- County: Posey
- Township: Lynn
- Elevation: 440 ft (130 m)
- Time zone: UTC-6 (Central (CST))
  - Summer (DST): UTC-5 (CDT)
- ZIP code: 47631
- Area codes: 812, 930
- GNIS feature ID: 444010

Springfield is an unincorporated community in Lynn Township, Posey County, Indiana, United States.

== History ==
Springfield was platted in 1817. The community served from its beginning until 1825 as the county seat, but when the seat was transferred to Mount Vernon in 1825, business activity shifted elsewhere, and the town's population dwindled. A post office was established at Springfield in 1818, and remained in operation until 1828.
