= Brambledown Halt railway station =

Disused railway station in Kent, England

Coordinates: 51.40886°N 0.82433°E

Brambledown Halt

General information
- Location: Sheppey, Swale; England
- Platforms: 1

Other information
- Status: Disused

History
- Original company: Sheppey Light Railway
- Pre-grouping: South Eastern & Chatham Railway
- Post-grouping: Southern Railway

Key dates
- Mar 1905: Opened
- 4 Dec 1950: Closed
Location

Brambledown Halt is a disused railway station between Minster and Eastchurch. It opened in 1905 and closed in 1950.

| Preceding station | Disused railways | Following station |
|---|---|---|
| Minster on Sea | Sheppey Light Railway | Eastchurch |
