= Marrs Center, Indiana =

- Unincorporated community
- Location within Indiana Location within the United States
- Coordinates: 37°56′44″N 87°45′18″W
- Country: United States
- State: Indiana
- County: Posey
- Township: Marrs
- Elevation: 443 ft (135 m)
- Time zone: UTC-6 (Central (CST))
  - Summer (DST): UTC-5 (CDT)
- ZIP code: 47620
- Area codes: 812, 930
- GNIS feature ID: 438645

Marrs Center is an unincorporated community in Marrs Township, Posey County, in the U.S. state of Indiana.

== History ==
Marrs Center took its name from Marrs Township.
