= Savah, Indiana =

Unincorporated community in Indiana, USA

- Unincorporated community
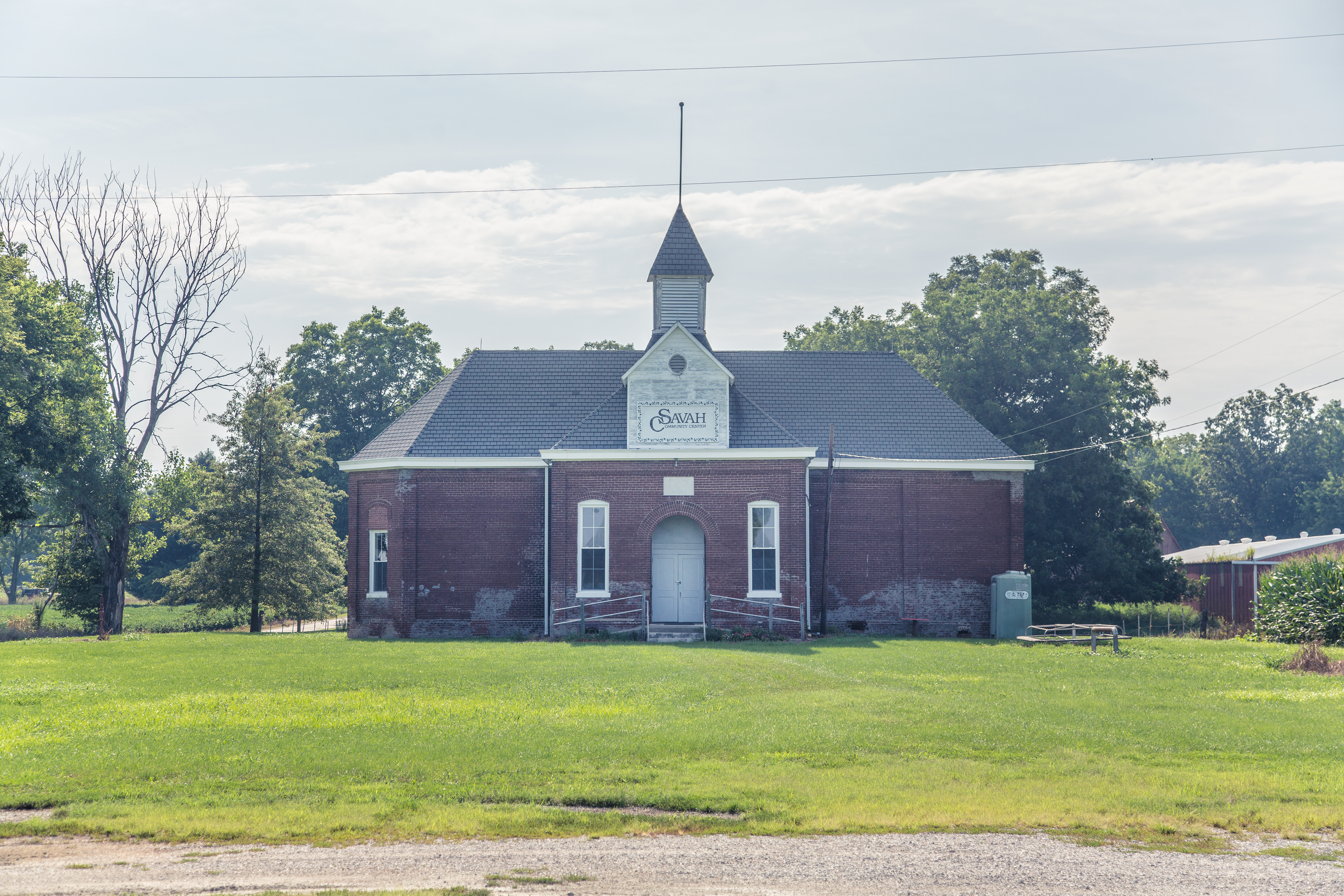

- Location within Indiana Location within the United States
- Coordinates: 38°01′04″N 87°58′43″W
- Country: United States
- State: Indiana
- County: Posey
- Township: Lynn
- Elevation: 400 ft (120 m)
- Time zone: UTC-6 (Central (CST))
  - Summer (DST): UTC-5 (CDT)
- ZIP code: 47620
- Area codes: 812, 930
- GNIS feature ID: 443047

Savah is an unincorporated community in Lynn Township, Posey County, in the U.S. state of Indiana.

== History ==
A post office was established at Savah in 1892, and remained in operation until it was discontinued in 1902.
