= Caborn principles =

The Cabourn principles are a list of instances when the relevant British Secretary of State, currently the Secretary of State for Housing, Communities and Local Government, may choose to use his power to call in a planning application for his determination, taking it out of the hands of a local planning authority.

The Cabourn principles are named after Richard Caborn, a Planning Minister who first established them in reply to a parliamentary question in June 1999.

There is no legal obligation on the Secretary of State to use his call-in powers, and the use of them is rare.

== Principles ==
As established in 1999, the possible criteria for a call-in were stated as being where a planning application

- may conflict with national policies on important matters;
- could have significant effects beyond the immediate locality;
- gives rise to substantial cross-boundary or national controversy;
- raises significant architectural or urban design issues; or
- may involve the interests of national security or of foreign governments.

One further criterion for calling-in applications was added in October 2012:

- may have significant long-term impact on economic growth and meeting housing needs across a wider area than a single local authority.

In the High Court case of R. v. Secretary of State for the Environment, ex parte Newprop, Mr Justice Forbes found that there was no duty on the Secretary of State to give reasons for a refusal to exercise the discretion to call in an application and that such a decision could only be challenged if it was "wildly perverse".
