= Queenborough Pier railway station =

Former railway station in England

Queenborough Pier
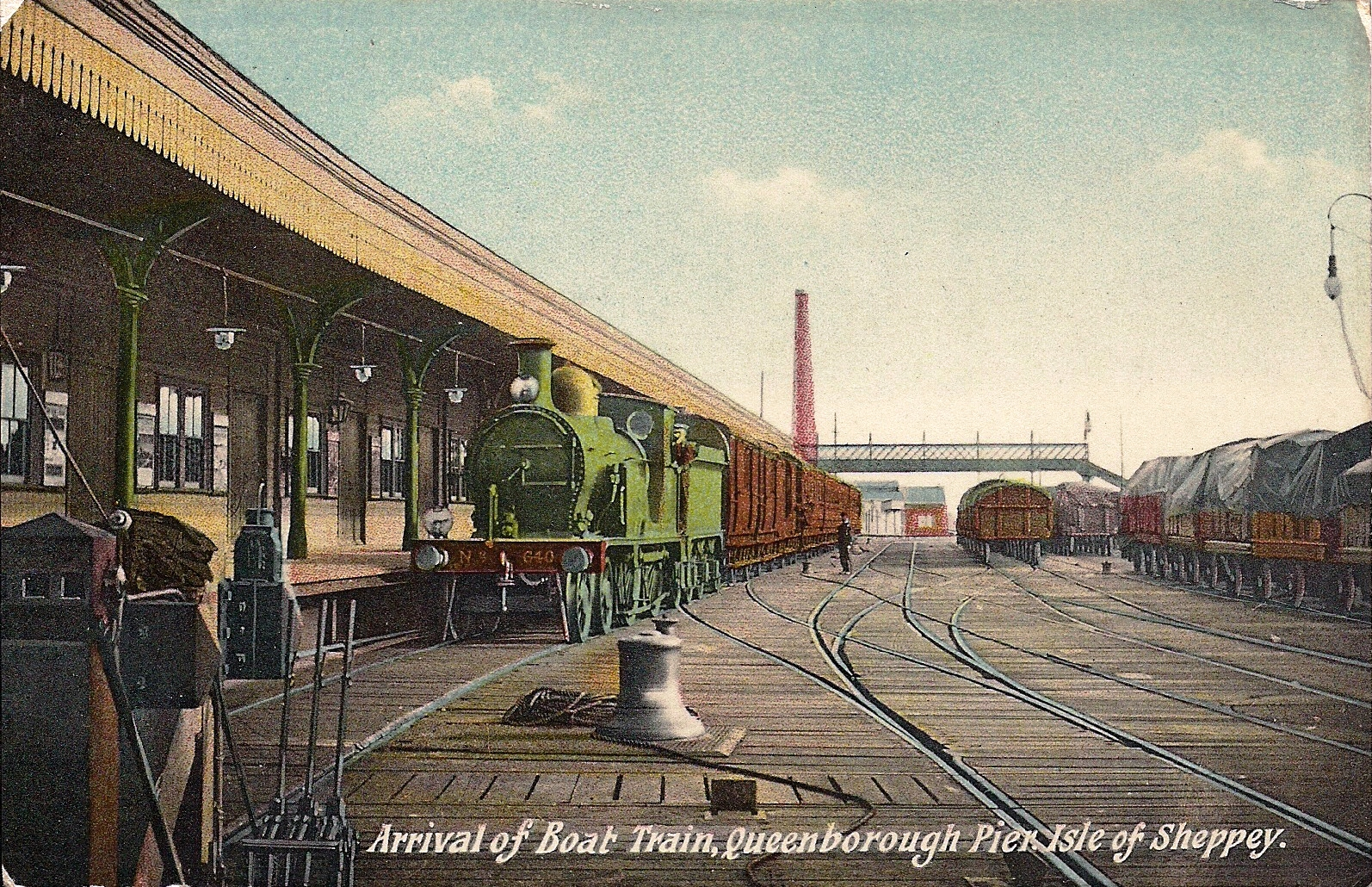

General information
- Location: Queenborough, Kent; England
- Coordinates: 51°25′25″N 0°44′03″E
- Grid reference: TQ 902 709

Other information
- Status: Disused

History
- Opened: 1863
- Original company: London, Chatham and Dover Railway
- Pre-grouping: South Eastern and Chatham Railway
- Post-grouping: Southern Railway

Key dates
- 1863: Opened to freight
- 15 May 1876: Opened to passengers
- November 1914: Closed to passengers
- 22 December 1922: Reopened to passengers
- 1 March 1923: Closed to passengers
- 1956: Closed to freight
- 1956: Station demolished
Location

Queenborough Pier railway station was a railway station opened by the London, Chatham and Dover Railway in 1863. Initially serving for freight, it was extended in 1876 and opened for passengers. The passenger service ceased in 1914, due to World War I, although Admiralty passenger traffic continued to use the station. Attempts to reintroduce a passenger service post-WWI were unsuccessful. The station continued to serve freight traffic until the mid-1950s.

== History ==
Queenborough Pier station was opened by the London, Chatham and Dover Railway (LCDR) c.1863. Initially, it served freight traffic. In 1876, the station was rebuilt and the pier was extended, opening to passengers on 15 May. The Stoomvaart Maatschappij Zeeland (SMZ) operated a service from Queenborough to Vlissingen, Netherlands. SMZ had been operating from Ramsgate, and had trialled a service from Sheerness in the summer of 1875.

On 19 May 1882, a fire occurred which closed the pier for three weeks. The fire killed two LCDR porters. Two people were trapped on the pier and dived into the water. They were rescued by the SMZ steamship Prins Hendrik. Twenty wagons were destroyed, as was the schooner Constance, which was aground alongside the pier.

SMZ transferred their services to Dover. The pier was rebuilt at a cost of £100,000.

A mail service to Germany operated from 1887. On 13 May 1896, a boat train collided with the buffer stop at the station. Seven people were injured.

The Sheerness line was closed to traffic between 5 and 11 February 1899 following flooding and to enable inspection of the Kingsferry Bridge. SMZ transferred their services to Port Victoria and the LCDR laid on a steamship service between Chatham and Queenborough Pier during this time. Another fire on 17 July 1900 resulted in the pier being closed. The fire was fought by 60 sailors sent from Sheerness Dockyard, a fireboat and HMS Asp, also sent from Sheerness. The Sheerness Dockyard Police Fire Brigade and the Sheerness Urban District Council Fire Brigade also assisted. The sailing barge Lena was slightly damaged, but was towed to safety by the Admiralty tug Sheerness. The SMZ steamship Koningen Regentes was able to move to safety under her own steam. Shipping was transferred to Port Victoria. Services resumed from Queenborough on 1 November.

Passenger services were withdrawn in November 1914, due to World War I, but the station was used by military traffic. An attempt to reintroduce passenger services post-WWI was unsuccessful, only operating between 22 December 1922 and 1 March 1923. SMZ operated from Queenborough Pier until 1927, when services were transferred to Harwich, Essex. The station had two signal boxes. Queenborough Signal Box closed on 25 May 1934. The station was used by the Admiralty during World War II. Whiteway Crossing Signal Box closed on 15 December 1946, and the branch was then worked as a siding. The station closed and was demolished in 1956.

As of 1993 the branch was open as far as Whiteway.

Preceding station	Disused railways	Following station
Terminus	British Railways; Southern Region; Sheerness line	Queenborough
