= West Franklin, Indiana =

- Unincorporated community
- Location within Indiana Location within the United States
- Coordinates: 37°53′42″N 87°42′46″W
- Country: United States
- State: Indiana
- County: Posey
- Township: Marrs
- Elevation: 367 ft (112 m)
- Time zone: UTC-6 (Central (CST))
  - Summer (DST): UTC-5 (CDT)
- ZIP code: 47620
- Area codes: 812, 930
- GNIS feature ID: 445765

West Franklin is an unincorporated community in Marrs Township, Posey County, in the U.S. state of Indiana.

== History ==
West Franklin was laid out in 1837. A post office was established at West Franklin in 1837, and remained in operation until 1902. With the construction of the railroad, business activity shifted to nearby Caborn, and the town's population dwindled.
