= Caborn, Indiana =

- Unincorporated community
- Location within Indiana Location within the United States
- Coordinates: 37°58′14″N 87°47′31″W
- Country: United States
- State: Indiana
- County: Posey
- Township: Marrs
- Elevation: 417 ft (127 m)
- Time zone: UTC-6 (Central (CST))
  - Summer (DST): UTC-5 (CDT)
- ZIP code: 47620
- Area codes: 812, 930
- GNIS feature ID: 449629

Caborn is an unincorporated community in Marrs Township, Posey County, in the U.S. state of Indiana.

== History ==
Caborn was laid out in 1871 by Cornelius Caborn, and named for him. A post office was established at Caborn in 1876, and remained in operation until 1911.
