= Development management in the United Kingdom =

Development Management (DM), formerly known as planning control, or development control, is the element of the United Kingdom's system of town and country planning through which local government or the Secretary of State, regulates land use and new building, i.e. development. It relies on a "plan-led system" whereby development plans are produced, involving various stages of public consultation prior to being adopted. Subsequently, development that requires planning permission, which is granted or refused with reference to the development plan as the starting point, then other material considerations are taken into account.

There are 421 local planning authorities (LPAs) in the United Kingdom (although in Scotland, where local authorities are unitary in nature, they are known simply as 'planning authorities'). Generally they are the local borough or district council or a unitary authority. Development involving mining, minerals or waste disposal matters is dealt with by county councils in non-metropolitan areas. Within national parks, it is the national park authority that determines planning applications (although in Scotland the situation is sightly different, whereby the Cairngorms National Park Authority only has the power to call-in and determine certain applications which it deems to be of importance to its objectives).

== History ==
When the UK's systems of town and country planning were established by the Town and Country Planning Act 1947 (10 & 11 Geo. 6. c. 51) and, in Scotland, the Town and Country Planning (Scotland) Act 1947 (10 & 11 Geo. 6. c. 53), it was generally expected that the great majority of new built development would be undertaken by the public sector: Local authorities, New Town Development Corporations, and the then-new National Health Service, for example. In those cases the commissioning body would grant itself planning permission for the proposals concerned. However, a separate system to grant or withhold planning permission for the small amount of development which would be undertaken by the private sector was also required. This was the origin of the modern system of planning control. In fact this expectation was entirely mistaken as, by the mid 1950s, the rate of private sector development was vastly exceeding that of the public sector. In modern times, development, including that by government departments and local authorities requires planning permission, and is subject to the same process of scrutiny as any private developer. An increasing range of developments are permitted development – a form of planning permission granted nationally or locally by order in advance.

In recent years, planning has become a key means of delivering a number of the government's objectives relating to climate change, reducing carbon emissions, access to housing and improving the supply of housing, enhancing biodiversity and a number of other emerging priorities. Although these are addressed via the process of formulating local planning policies for the area of each LPA on a local basis, as far as the public are concerned it is development control and the process of determining planning applications which is the most evident part of the planning system as a whole.

Note that within the United Kingdom, any significant development may require a variety of different consents from different agencies before commencement, such as approval of construction materials and methods under the relevant Building Regulations. The term "development control" is out of favour and development management is preferred as it implies a more cooperative process, though in reality the difference is sometimes difficult to distinguish. There is after all a limit to the level of cooperation possible if proposals are unacceptable.

== Scope of development management ==
The UK is distinguished from most countries in that the lawful occupier of any land or buildings will not only have title to their land (a freehold, leasehold, or licence from the actual land owner), but also requires planning title for any buildings on the land, or uses to which the land and buildings are put. Planning title (usually referred to as "planning permission") was granted for all pre-existing buildings and uses in 1948. Since that date planning permission has been required for all new development. A grant of planning permission relates to the land or building(s) concerned. With a few rare exceptions it is not specific to the person, organisation or firm who obtained the permission.

"Development" in UK planning law is defined as the carrying out of any building, engineering, mining or other operations in, on, over or under land, or the making of any material change in the use of any buildings or other land. Certain types of development are specifically excluded from the definition of development, such as routine building maintenance and repair. Many categories of minor development are classified by legislation as "permitted development" (PD). These are in effect granted an automatic planning permission by law, rather than requiring any specific application for planning permission. Another way of looking at it is that Permitted Development is a form of nationally approved planning permission. Although still defined as "development" these works (may) avoid a need to engage with the planning system and can be undertaken by land owners as a right. More recent changes to PD rules require some element of contact with the LPA before implementation - for example prior notification.

Uses of land and buildings are classified into "use classes" and any change from one use class to another use class is automatically a "material change of use" amounting to development. Some small scale changes between use classes are nevertheless "permitted development" and hence do not require planning permission, subject to any site specific restrictions. Certain types of use or activity do not fall into a specific use class and are termed "sui generis". Any change of use to or from "sui generis" use requires planning permission. In practice most uses are a composite of several uses so that, say, a factory might well have an ancillary office and perhaps storage uses, all within the same premises. In such a case however the primary use would be that of a factory (use class B1 or B2).

There is a separate system of control over alterations to buildings which are listed as being of architectural or historic interest ("listed buildings"). Alterations to such a building that affect its architectural or historic character, inside or outside, require "listed building consent" (and may also require planning permission if the scope of the proposed alterations or development is above that classified as permitted development). It is an offence to carry out works without the necessary listed building consent. The owner of a listed building can also be compelled to keep it in a good state of repair to safeguard its architectural or historic significance.

Trees and woodland which are of particular importance to local amenity or ecology may be made the subject of a tree preservation order (TPO). Unless those trees are dead, dying or dangerous, then consent is required before their removal, and generally a replacement tree may be required.

If development is carried out without planning permission then the LPA may take "enforcement action" to have the building removed, the land reinstated, or at least undertake the minimum measures required to remove the harm arising. Generally, a retrospective application for planning permission would be invited if there is a reasonable likelihood of it being permitted, and action taken if planning permission is refused or the development incapable of being made acceptable. Almost all planning permissions are granted conditionally and enforcement action can also be taken to secure compliance with the conditions imposed. Unauthorised development can be the subject of a "stop notice" if there is an urgent need to prevent further harm.

== Call-in by Secretary of State ==
Under Section 77 of the Town and Country Planning Act 1990, the Secretary of State for Housing, Communities and Local Government has the power to call in any planning application for his or her determination, taking it out of the hands of the local planning authority. The Caborn principles are the established criteria for such a decision, which in practice is only rarely used.

== Principles of development management ==
=== Development Plan and Local Development Framework ===
Applications for planning permission must by law be decided in accordance with relevant policies within the Development Plan prepared and published by the LPA, "unless other material considerations indicate otherwise". Development management is therefore "policy led".

From 2006, in England, each area's Development Plan is to be replaced by a Local Development Framework (LDF). These involve a large measure of community and public involvement in preparing the new local planning policies by which applications will be decided in future years. Therefore, while the process for local plan preparation maybe appear to be distant from making day-to-day decisions it is vital in making sure the 'rulebook' says the right things.

The planning policies expressed in the LDF deal with a wide range of local issues including promoting more energy efficient transport facilities, highway proposals and highway safety, ensuring an adequate supply of land for housing and other uses, safeguarding areas of countryside, and safeguarding important landscapes or sites of historic, ecological or scientific importance. More specific policies usually promote best practice in building design as a reflection of local traditions and priorities. The interests of sustainability are built into LDFs, not only in terms of energy efficiency, but also in promoting economic growth, regeneration, and the fostering of strong and inclusive communities. Whatever their local priorities, LDFs are a key policy document for all local authorities, enabling them and other local agencies to engage in spatial planning for their local area on an inclusive and "joined up" basis.

=== Design and Access Statement ===
Planning applications for most major developments must be accompanied by a Design and Access Statement. This is not just a description of the development, but also explains how the design was arrived at, what local planning policies have been observed, how any public engagement has been reflected in the design, and how relevant principles of good design have contributed to the proposal. Commercial issues may well have been paramount, but this document enables the lay public to understand how the proposal evolved, and acts as a check upon the quality of the decision making process which led to that proposal by the developer concerned. Most are written at the end of the process and are of limited value. Isochrone maps may be included.

=== Material considerations ===
The issue of what might be a material planning consideration in deciding any given case can be complex. This issue has never been legislated upon by Parliament and consists entirely of judge-made law arising out of numerous cases decided by British courts. In short, they are planning issues relevant to the specific case. What is material to one application may not be material to another. The decision maker needs to choose, subject to challenge in the courts. A local or Government planning policy is most likely to be material and issues of public safety or amenity can be in any given case. An important point is that planning control is concerned only with the broad public interest, rather than protecting any person's private interests. Competition between businesses is not a planning consideration; neither is the developer's profit motives, or any supposed loss of value to nearby properties or loss of view. Private covenants over land or anything regulated by other legislation are also incapable of being a material consideration in deciding a planning application.

In deciding on a planning application LPAs have a duty to start with the development plan and then have regard to all of the material planning considerations. However, while they cannot choose to simply ignore a relevant issue, provided they behave reasonably they are entitled to decide how much weight should be given to competing priorities.

If planning permission is to be refused, or if enforcement action is to be taken against unauthorised development, then the LPA must give reasons in writing which show "demonstrable harm to interests of acknowledged importance". Unpopularity is not grounds for refusal of planning permission. A proper reason for refusal of planning permission must be based on the tangible harm which would be brought about by the proposal, as reflected in a relevant policy or other matter relating to planning, and in order to protect the public interest. Similarly, if a condition is to be imposed on the grant of any planning permission, compliance with that condition should be essential to make acceptable a development which would otherwise be unacceptable (i.e. refused planning permission).

=== Appeals against decisions ===
A decision made by an LPA is subject to a right of appeal in the event of refusal of planning permission, the taking of enforcement action, imposition of an onerous or improper condition on a granted planning permission, or the failure of the LPA to determine the application within a timely period ("non-determination"). The right of appeal applies only to the applicant/developer who is aggrieved by the decision of an LPA. Third parties such as a member of the public who disagrees with the decision of an LPA to grant planning permission do not have any right of appeal.

Planning appeals in England and Wales are administered and decided by the Planning Inspectorate PINS, which is an executive agency of the UK Government. In Scotland appeals are determined by the Scottish Government Directorate for Planning & Environmental Appeals (DfPEA), and in Northern Ireland appeals are determined by the Planning Appeals Commission. An Inspector (in England and Wales), Reporter (in Scotland), or Commissioner (in Northern Ireland) investigates the question and decides to uphold or overturn the decision of the LPA. The decision is based on a fresh look at the case considering the representations that have been made by each party. A planning inspector (or equivalent) may find fault with the reasoning of the LPA but still dismiss the appeal based on their own reasoning of the issues and planning policies which are relevant to the case. In England around 65% of planning appeals uphold the original decision of the LPA.

== Public involvement in development management ==
The public have a right to be consulted before any planning application is decided by the LPA. Land owners immediately adjoining the application site are usually notified, a public notice may be posted in nearby streets, and sometimes a notice is published in the local press. Planning applications must be decided in a timely manner and only 21 days is normally allowed by law for the public to express their views. Planning applications can be viewed on the LPA's website and comments can be submitted by email.

=== Delegated powers and committees ===
Most planning applications are decided by an authorised senior officer of the LPA - under what are known as "delegated powers". Only major or controversial applications are decided by elected councillors meeting as a Planning Committee of the authority concerned. The agenda of the committee meeting with a report by planning officers on each planning application is usually published at least five working days before the meeting. The report on any planning application should contain a description of the development, a fair summary of any public comments received, state the relevant planning policies which have a bearing on the decision and a discussion of the issues raised – all leading to a recommendation to either grant or refuse planning permission. The elected Planning Committee may act on the advice of their professional planning officers, or occasionally may take a different view.

Planning Committee are under the same requirement as officers to determine applications development plan first and also considering material considerations. Members may need to temper the views of their constituents with a clear judgement of the planning merits of the case. Applications should not be determined on the basis of their popularity of unpopularity. The committee may refuse planning permission for development even if their own professional planning officers have recommended that planning permission be granted, or allow an application that officers recommend should be refused. However this must be based on a planning judgement of relevant matters.

Refusal of an application, whether by committee or under delegated powers, may be challenged by an appeal through the Planning Inspectorate. Objectors to a successful application have no right of appeal, except by a legal challenge to the courts, although for some significant applications (e.g. involving major policy matters) the Secretary of State may be asked to "call in" an application for review.

Subject to making arrangements in advance, many LPAs will invite applicants and members of the public to address the Planning Committee before making their decision. However, the Committee is "a meeting conducted in public", rather than "a public meeting"; although given an opportunity to speak at the outset of the meeting, members of the public will not be allowed to join in the committee's debate. There are a number of LPAs that still do not permit the public or the applicant to speak at the committee meeting at all.

There are often different views as to what constitutes “fairness” in deciding planning applications. Many public objections to new development are explicitly based on a perception of unfairness that developers and landowners should be allowed to profit, while near neighbours, the local environment or the community as a whole do not. More specific objections may also be given, but this apparent unfairness is the fundamental of many if not most public objections to new development. The process of development and re-development is seen as an immediate cost or inconvenience to those living nearby, and any benefits are invariably to the community as a whole, over a wider geographical area, and over time. The most obvious beneficiaries of any development are those who will later live or work within it but their views are not heard when a planning application is being decided. Even a well managed LPA, making decisions in light of published planning policies and after extensive public consultation, will still attract accusations of unfairness.

=== Public influence ===
Unless a member of the public raises one or more material planning considerations which were not apparent beforehand, it is unusual for public views to override the relevant planning policies when the decision is made. The importance of public opinion is in adding flavour to the issues from the point of view of the decision maker. Applications cannot be determined on the basis of s popularity contest. They can be influential in deciding how much "weight" to give to different material considerations. Unpopular proposals often attract well orchestrated public opposition and it is not unusual for an LPA to receive multiple copies of the same pre-written letter of objection from a large number of people, or petitions with numerous signatures. It is not unknown for LPAs to receive letters of objection to a proposal with fake names and addresses in an effort to increase the level of apparent public opposition to a planning application. Some objectors to a development will also write to their Member of Parliament or to other people who are mistakenly believed to have influence over the outcome of a planning application but MPs will scrupulously avoid seeking to influence the proper functioning of a democratically elected LPA. Although members are democratically elected, they should not decide applications on the basis of strength of public opinion, but according to planning law. If there are no substantial planning grounds for refusing an application, a planning inspector at appeal could well order the LPA to pay costs if its actions are shown to be both unreasonable and put the other side to unnecessary costs. The conduct of an appellant is similarly liable.

The most effective methods of influencing the outcome of a planning application is to make written representations to the LOA and to one or more of the elected councillors who form the LPA, whose contact details are readily available on the LPA's website. Local councillors who are also members of the LPA's Planning Committee may be reluctant to meet with applicants or members of the public in person in order to prevent subsequent allegations of bias or pre-determination when the Planning Committee comes to make a decision.

=== Conflicts of interest ===
Councillors who are members of a Council's Planning Committee are subject to different restrictions regarding conflicts of interest, depending on the country of the United Kingdom, and to a Code of Conduct which may be statutory or locally decided.

In England, councillors are required to register Disclosable Pecuniary Interests and to declare them when they are engaged. They cannot speak or vote when they have such a conflict of interest.

In Scotland, the relevant standards are decided by the Scottish Parliament and patrolled by the Standards Commission for Scotland.

In Wales, councillors are required to register certain interests, to declare them when they are relevant to a decision, and to withdraw from the meeting if they have a prejudicial interest.

Most LPAs are receptive to public complaints and seek to learn from them. The great majority of public complaints about planning matters concern an alleged error in procedure, rather than the outcome of a permitted development as later built.

A member of the public whose complaint is well founded and who has suffered genuine injury or injustice as a result of maladministration can also pursue their complaint at the national level through the Local Government Ombudsman.

=== Predetermination ===
Both in Planning Committees and when taking other decisions, councillors are also required to avoid bias in the form of predetermination. There is much case law on this, and the present position (following the decision of the Court of Appeal in Persimmon Homes Teesside Limited v. Lewis 2008) is that whilst Members may have a predisposition to a view on a particular application, they must not have predetermined it in the sense that they come to the decision with their mind closed to the arguments of fellow members and the advice of the Officers. This causes difficulty, because members of the public, action groups etc. not only ask Councillors to listen to their views, but also try to persuade them to commit for or against a Planning Application in advance, without understanding that if they do so there will be a risk of a legal challenge to the decision if those taking it have predetermined their position.

== Proposed reforms to system ==
Historically most decisions on planning applications have been framed around the question of whether the proposed development is “bad enough to warrant being refused planning permission”. The thrust of recent reforms to the planning system as a whole has been to raise the game of both developers and their advisors, along with LPAs, so that the question becomes “is the proposed development good enough to deserve planning permission”. In reality the test is a more neutral "Is it acceptable in planning terms"?

The requirement to prepare a Design and Access Statement (D&A) for most significant developments, requires applicants to explain or justify their proposals in those terms. The objective was that a living document would evolve through the design process leading to better thought through proposals. This culture change has only been partly successful as applicants often see it as one more task to get through and tend to have D&As drawn up after completion of design work to 'tick the box'. The policy intention of the UK Government and most LPAs is that new developments should contribute positively to their surroundings, rather than merely avoid doing unacceptable harm.

LPAs make extensive use of electronic systems for reasons of efficiency and also to encourage transparency. Almost all have their own website and electronic document management systems where planning applications can be viewed and commented upon, along with local planning policy documents viewed and a wide range of other relevant sources. Provided that architectural drawings and other supporting documents are in electronic form then planning applications should ideally be submitted on-line, either via the LPA's website or via the UK-wide "planning portal" website which provides a nationwide clearing house on planning information and facilities.

LPAs are under constant pressure to improve the speed, efficiency and quality of decision making. Applicants are usually advised to engage in discussion with the LPA before finalising any planning application in order to research the relevant planning policies and other local issues. LPAs vary in their attitude to pre-application discussion but the advantage is to front load the process, and reduce the formal planning application closer to a “rubber stamp”. In the past developers often submitted a planning application as the start of what was expected to be a lengthy process of negotiation with the LPA. Attitudes have now changed and few LPAs will agree to accept significantly amended proposals after submission of the application since this would require them to restart public consultations and so delay their decision. Along with the requirement to prepare well written and complete documentation with the original submission this puts the onus increasingly on the applicant to get their proposal right first time.

About half a million planning applications are submitted throughout the UK each year. Of those around 60% relate to “householder applications” – that is for extensions or alterations to an individual's house. A much larger number of householder proposals are classed as permitted development and do not require a planning application to be made. Only about 30% of householder planning applications are significantly altered before being granted, or are actually refused permission as unacceptable. This raises the issue of whether the time of LPAs is being well spent when such types of minor development could be codified and either excluded from planning control altogether, or subject to a much simpler regime of control. Among other things this would free resources for more important work in implementing local planning policies which would be of wider public benefit. The UK Government periodically prepares new legislation along these lines.

== See also ==
- English land law
- Town and country planning in the United Kingdom
- Development management (Scotland)
- Listed building
- Scheduled monument
- Register of Historic Parks and Gardens of Special Historic Interest in England
- Conservation area (United Kingdom)
- Land Utilisation Survey of Britain (1930)
