= Sheppey Light Railway =

Railway in England

Coordinates: 51.3994°N 0.8380°E

The Sheppey Light Railway was a railway on the Isle of Sheppey, Kent, England, which ran from Leysdown to Queenborough, where it connected with the South Eastern and Chatham Railway's Sheerness Line. It was engineered by Holman Fred Stephens and opened in August 1901 and closed on 4 December 1950. Originally there were stations at Sheerness East, East Minster on Sea, Minster on Sea, Eastchurch and Leysdown. Two halts were opened in 1905 at Brambledown and Harty Road.

Sheppey Light Railway, shown with other railway lines in Kent.

== History ==
Authorised by the Sheppey Light Railway Order 1898, the completed line was inspected by the Board of Trade in mid-June 1901, who recommended some changes to the signalling. The railway was opened on 1 August 1901, with a formal opening ceremony a few weeks later. Freight on the line was shunted into sidings at Brambledown, Grove, Holford and Harty Road. Brambledown and Harty Road were upgraded to halts in 1905 by the addition to each of a simple platform and waiting hut. Passenger trains were run morning and afternoon, with a single freight train scheduled at lunchtime.

During WWI a siding into the Royal Navy Aviation School (later RAF Eastchurch) was built running south of Eastchurch station from the Queenborough end. It was inspected by the Board of Trade (Colonel Pringle) in December 1916, but the inspector was unhappy that the loop points in the station were now controlled by two separate ground frames. These were replaced with a single ground frame which took another nine months. The RAF base continued in use until 1946.

The line had a relaxed atmosphere according to recollections of Don Pilcher, the fireman on the last train before the railway closed for all traffic on 4 December 1950. He said "It was a bit like a bus service really. We would stop for anyone who waved a hanky or an arm indicating they wanted to get on". The last train carried a mock coffin with a large wreath of vegetables to signify the death of the line, and large crowds were present at every station. The driver of the last train, Tom Birchnell, shook hands with the driver of the first train to run on the railway (in 1901), Jack Buddle.

== Locomotives and rolling stock ==
For the first few years after opening the SE&CR operated the line using standard locomotives and stock. However the light traffic on the line required a rethink.

=== Petrol railcars ===
In 1904 trials were carried out of two petrol engined railcars. One only had seats for four passengers, insufficient even for this byway, but the larger 16 seat railcar proved satisfactory. Unfortunately it proved impossible to find a motor mechanic on Sheppey to maintain it in those early days of internal combustion so the SE&CR had to stay with steam power.

=== Steam railmotors ===
The solution was a steam railmotor – a small steam engine permanently coupled to a carriage portion. Two were bought in 1905, one for the Sheppey Light and one for the equally remote Hundred of Hoo branch on the other side of the Medway estuary. A further six were acquired in 1906 for use on other lightly used services. The railmotors remained in use until the outbreak of World War I. The steam engine components were scrapped but the carriage portions were united in pairs, coupled over a shared bogie, and in this format they remained in use on Sheppey, hauled by normal steam engines, until the line's closure.

=== Goods traffic ===
As the steam railmotors did not have enough power to pull goods wagons, the SE&CR sought out a small engine for the daily goods service. One, No. 54 Waddon, was obtained secondhand from their neighbour and rival, the London Brighton and South Coast Railway. This was one of that railway's famous Terrier class tank engines. This particular example survived into British Railways days and is still preserved, albeit as a static exhibit, in Canada's National Railway Museum.

=== LCDR 653 and 20 ===
Two carriages that were used on the Sheppey Light Railway are preserved. These two being London, Chatham & Dover Railway No. 20 6w Saloon and No. 653 BTZ, later Saloon are preserved on the Isle of Wight Steam Railway. No. 20's centre wheel was removed for use on the IoWR when absorbed into Southern Railway ownership in 1924. No. 20 and 653 join over 15 more SR-used on-IOW carriages. Restoration of 20 was completed in 1993 and 653 was officially restored in 1979.

== Incidents ==
In August 1934 the body of a retired chargeman of boilermakers, Henry Bourne, was found alongside the line. He was suffering from cancer and the verdict at the inquest was "Suicide while of unsound mind".

In April 1935 a car collided with a train on an ungated level crossing in Station Road, MInster, killing one man (Frank Mogni) and seriously injuring three others.

On 4 August 1935 a body was found next to the line near Leysdown, identified at the inquest as Frank Towndrow (62) of London. He wasn't well and his widow didn't know he had left London. The verdict was accidental death, though the railway was encouraged to take steps to prevent people wandering on the line.

The North coast of Kent can receive large amounts of snow when the wind blows from the North-East, and in 1940 a large snowfall stranded a train crew on the Sheppey Light Railway for three days and nights. The driver and fireman were accommodated at the RAF Station at Eastchurch. The rescue engine that was sent was stranded at Sheerness East. The locomotive had eventually to be towed back to its depot.

== Sources ==
- Kidner, R. W. (1985). Southern Railway Halts. Survey and Gazetteer. Headington, Oxford: The Oakwood Press. ISBN 0-85361-321-4.
