= National Register of Historic Places listings in Warrick County, Indiana =

Location of Warrick County in Indiana

This is a list of the National Register of Historic Places listings in Warrick County, Indiana.

This is intended to be a complete list of the properties and districts on the National Register of Historic Places in Warrick County, Indiana, United States. Latitude and longitude coordinates are provided for many National Register properties and districts; these locations may be seen together in a map.

There are 9 properties and districts listed on the National Register in the county.

Properties and districts located in incorporated areas display the name of the municipality, while properties and districts in unincorporated areas display the name of their civil township. Properties and districts split between multiple jurisdictions display the names of all jurisdictions.

This National Park Service list is complete through NPS recent listings posted December 19, 2025.

== Current listings ==
	Name on the Register	Image	Date listed	Location	City or town	Description
1	Angel Mounds	Angel Mounds	October 15, 1966 (#66000124)	8215 Pollack Ave. 37°56′35″N 87°27′06″W	Ohio Township	Extends into Vanderburgh County
2	Boonville Public Square Historic District	Boonville Public Square Historic District	January 23, 1987 (#86002720)	Bounded roughly by 1st, Sycamore, 4th, and Walnut; 38°02′57″N 87°16′29″W	Boonville	
3	Ellerbusch Archeological Site (12W56)	Ellerbusch Archeological Site (12W56)	March 14, 1991 (#91000270)	Atop the bluff northwest of the junction of State Road 662 and Ellerbursch Rd., west of Newburgh; 37°57′09″N 87°25′32″W	Ohio Township	
4	Old Newburgh Presbyterian Church	Old Newburgh Presbyterian Church	May 23, 1978 (#78000040)	N. State and W. Main Sts. 37°56′44″N 87°24′19″W	Newburgh	
5	Old Warrick County Jail	Old Warrick County Jail	February 14, 1979 (#79000025)	124 E. Main St. 38°03′01″N 87°16′24″W	Boonville	
6	Original Newburgh Historic District	Original Newburgh Historic District	June 16, 1983 (#83000162)	Roughly bounded by State Road 662 and Water, Monroe, Main, and Middle Sts. 37°56′40″N 87°24′19″W	Newburgh	
7	Pyeatt's Mill Iron Bridge	Pyeatt's Mill Iron Bridge	August 23, 2022 (#100008058)	Boner Rd. crossing of Little Pigeon Cr. 37°56′32″N 87°15′07″W	Hatfield vicinity	Built 1869 by the King Bridge Company. Crosses into Spencer County.
8	Roberts-Morton House	Roberts-Morton House	December 16, 1974 (#74000024)	1.5 miles east of Newburgh on State Road 662; 37°56′12″N 87°22′46″W	Ohio Township	
9	Yankeetown Archeological Site	Yankeetown Archeological Site	February 28, 1979 (#79000026)	Along the Ohio River bank in Section 21 of Anderson Township, south of Yankeetown; 37°54′01″N 87°18′22″W	Anderson Township	

== See also ==
- List of National Historic Landmarks in Indiana
- National Register of Historic Places listings in Indiana
- Listings in neighboring counties: Daviess (KY), Dubois, Gibson, Henderson (KY), Pike, Vanderburgh
- List of Indiana state historical markers in Warrick County
