= Doc Gorman =

American football player (1893–1938)

Profile
- Positions: End, Tackle

Personal information
- Born: July 23, 1893; Pawnee, Illinois
- Died: September 22, 1938 (aged 45); Evanston, Illinois

Career information
- College: St. Louis University

Career history
- Evansville Ex-Collegians (1920); Evansville Crimson Giants (1921–1922)
- Stats at Pro Football Reference

Otho Addison "Doc" Gorman (July 23, 1893 – September 22, 1938) was a professional football player during the early 1920s. He played in the National Football League, in 1921 and 1922, for the Evansville Crimson Giants. Gorman also played halfback at the college level for St. Louis University.

Gorman also played football in 1920 with the semi-pro Evansville Ex-Collegians. When Frank Fausch established his Crimson Giants in 1921, many of the Ex-Collegians, including Gorman, stayed loyal to Ex-Collegians manager Menz Lindsey. However once Fausch gained the only lease to Bosse Field, the city's only football field, Gorman became the first Ex-Collegians, outside of Fausch and Mark Ingle, to join the team.

Outside of pro football, Gorman worked as a dentist.
