= Bibbles Bawel =

American gridiron football player (1930–2024)

No. 81, 20, 72
- Position: Safety

Personal information
- Born: November 21, 1930; Boonville, Indiana, U.S.
- Died: July 4, 2024 (aged 93); Jasper, Indiana, U.S.
- Listed height: 6 ft 1 in (1.85 m)
- Listed weight: 185 lb (84 kg)

Career information
- High school: Boonville
- College: Evansville College (1948–1951)
- NFL draft: 1952: undrafted

Career history
- Philadelphia Eagles (1952, 1955–1956); Hamilton Tiger-Cats (1957)

Awards and highlights
- Grey Cup champion (1957)

Career NFL statistics
- Interceptions: 18
- Fumble recoveries: 3
- Total touchdowns: 3
- Stats at Pro Football Reference

Edward Raymond "Bibbles" Bawel (November 21, 1930 – July 4, 2024) was an American professional football safety in the National Football League (NFL) for the Philadelphia Eagles. He also was a member of the Hamilton Tiger-Cats in the Interprovincial Rugby Football Union. He played college football at Evansville College. Bawel died on July 4, 2024, at the age of 93.

== Early life ==
Bawel attended Boonville High School. He accepted a basketball scholarship from the Evansville College, where he was a three-sport standout; winning a total of five varsity letters in football, basketball and baseball.

He was a starter on the 1951–52 basketball team for the legendary coach Arad McCutchan. He led the Purple Aces to a record of 22–1–2 from 1948 to 1951; the 1949 Ohio Valley Conference championship and appearances in the 1948 and 1949 Refrigerator Bowls. He was named the MVP of the 1949 Refrigerator Bowl.

In 1979, he was inducted into the Indiana Football Hall of Fame.

== Professional career ==
Bawel was signed as an undrafted free agent by the Philadelphia Eagles after the 1952 NFL draft, after his coach Don Ping, being a friend of the Philadelphia Eagles head coach Jim Trimble, convinced him to give Bawel a try out. As a rookie, he made the team as a defensive back, leading the league with 34 punt returns. He also intercepted eight passes.

He was called for military duty at the end of his rookie season, rejoining the team two seasons later in 1955. That year, he intercepted 9 passes (a franchise record until 1971), finishing second in the league to Willard Sherman. He also led the league in return yards (168) and touchdown returns (2).

In 1957, he followed Trimble to the Hamilton Tiger-Cats of the Interprovincial Rugby Football Union, as a two-way player (offensive end and defensive back). He helped the team win the 45th Grey Cup, where he had 2 interceptions and was famously tripped by a spectator (David Humphrey) standing on the sidelines in front of the Winnipeg Blue Bombers bench, preventing him from returning the second one for a touchdown.
