= Chandler, Indiana =

- Town
- Town of Chandler
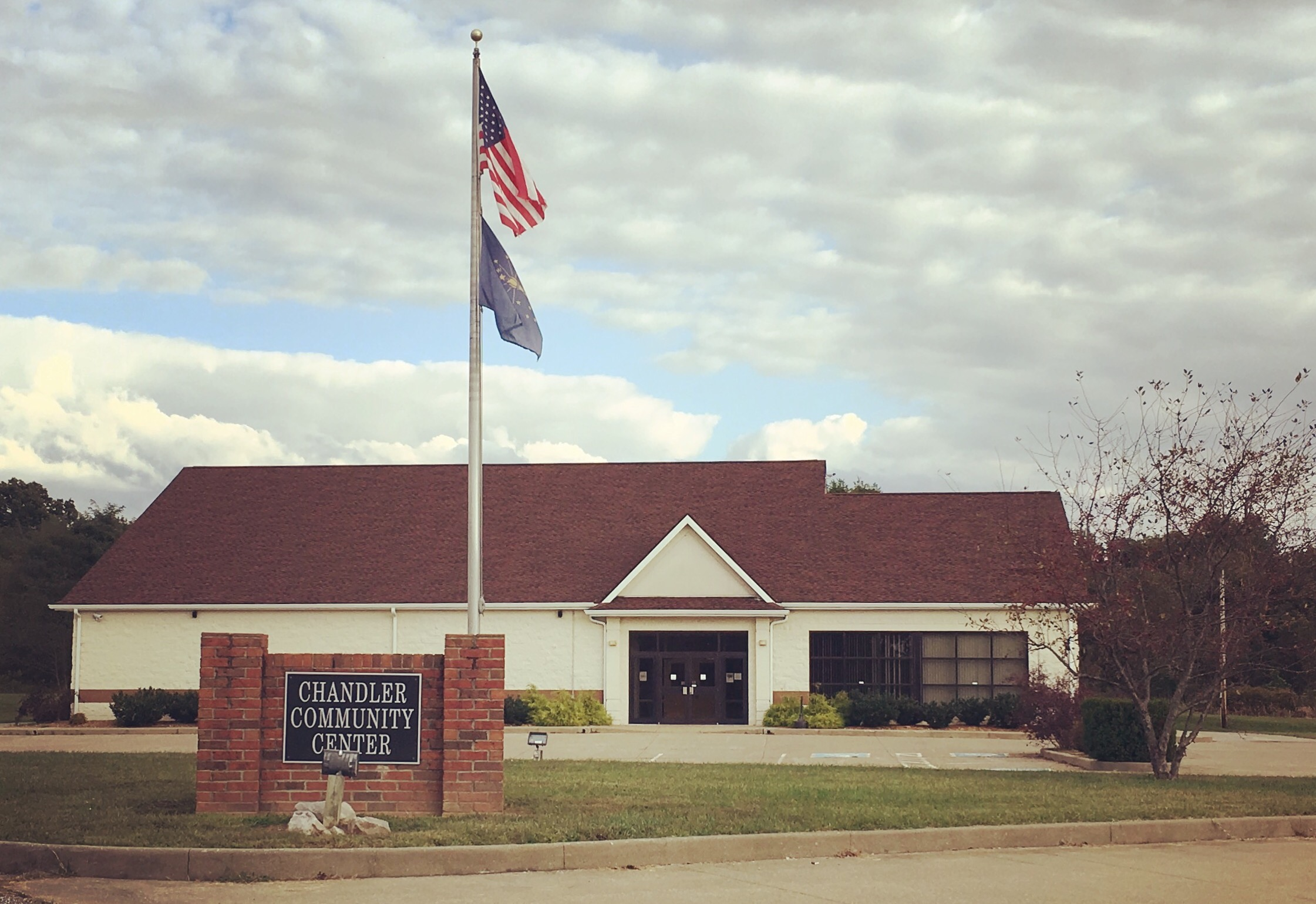
- Chandler Community Center

- Flag

- Location of Chandler in Warrick County, Indiana.
- Coordinates: 38°2′14″N 87°22′27″W
- Country: United States
- State: Indiana
- County: Warrick
- Townships: Boon, Ohio

Area
  - Total: 2.92 sq mi (7.55 km^{2})
  - Land: 2.92 sq mi (7.55 km^{2})
  - Water: 0 sq mi (0.00 km^{2})
- Elevation: 387 ft (118 m)

Population (2020)
  - Total: 3,693
  - Density: 1,267.3/sq mi (489.29/km^{2})
- Time zone: UTC-6 (CST)
  - Summer (DST): UTC-5 (CDT)
- ZIP code: 47610
- Area code: 812
- FIPS code: 18-12034
- GNIS feature ID: 2396639
- Website: www.townofchandler.org

Chandler is a town straddling Ohio and Boon Township in Warrick County, Indiana, United States, located just east of Evansville, Indiana along the Ohio River. The population was 3,693 at the 2020 census, making it Warrick County's second-most populous municipality after Boonville. The town is part of the Evansville metropolitan area with a population of 342,815.

== History ==
In 1847, the area which is now Chandler opened a post office named Lee to serve its residents. By that time, a portion of the Central Canal (a piece of the Wabash and Erie Canal) was completed just outside of town that connected nearby Evansville with present-day Worthington. The canal system was never fully completed, having met its doom with financial problems and competition from the railroad boom, but part of the canal remains today along with the old tow path, aptly named Tow Path Road.

In 1874, Lee officially became Chandler. The town got its new moniker from O.E. Chandler, the foreman of the Lake Erie, Evansville & South Western Railroad, which had completed construction on a new railway through town the year before. Using the creek bed from the failed Wabash and Erie Canal, L E E & S W RR created a rail line from Evansville through Chandler and on to Gentryville. Although the line is no longer used for passenger travel, Norfolk Southern still operates cargo trains on a portion of the railway that follows the Central Canal. The former Chandler Depot also remains, although it now serves as a private residence.

In 1875, the first underground coal mine in town opened, Chandler Mine. Warrick County lies on the eastern edge of the Illinois Basin, making it a vast coal resource; once the use of coal became mainstreamed for locomotives (and later, for generating electricity), companies flocked to the area to begin mining operations. Chandler was no different, with six different underground mines having operated here at various times over nearly a century. No more than three underground mines operated at any one time in Chandler; the Erie Canal/Air Line Mine had the longest history, having operated for 40 years before shutting down in 1937.

By the mid-1940s, all but one mine had shut down. This allowed for above-ground development, and the construction business boomed. Within a five-year period, houses sprung up like mushrooms and the population more than doubled.

In 1953, the town became incorporated, and three trustees and a clerk-treasurer were elected to lead the citizens of Chandler. For the next two decades, town officials and residents worked to organize and equip a volunteer fire department, improve streets and install street lights, construct water wells and a water treatment plant, complete a sewer treatment plant and system, and purchase a building to house town offices. More recently, residential, commercial, and industrial development has remained slow and steady.

== Geography ==
According to the 2010 census, Chandler has a total area of 2.03 square miles (5.26 km^{2}), all land.

=== Climate ===
The climate in this area is characterized by hot, humid summers and generally cool to cold winters. According to the Köppen Climate Classification system, Chandler has a humid subtropical climate, abbreviated "Cfa" on climate maps.

== Demographics ==
Historical population
Census	Pop.	Note	%±
1960	1,784		—
1970	2,032		13.9%
1980	3,043		49.8%
1990	3,099		1.8%
2000	3,094		−0.2%
2010	2,887		−6.7%
2020	3,693		27.9%
U.S. Decennial Census

=== 2020 census ===
As of the 2020 census, Chandler had a population of 3,693. The median age was 36.6 years. 25.3% of residents were under the age of 18 and 14.1% of residents were 65 years of age or older. For every 100 females there were 98.5 males, and for every 100 females age 18 and over there were 96.6 males age 18 and over.

96.9% of residents lived in urban areas, while 3.1% lived in rural areas.

There were 1,462 households in Chandler, of which 35.0% had children under the age of 18 living in them. Of all households, 47.1% were married-couple households, 18.8% were households with a male householder and no spouse or partner present, and 24.1% were households with a female householder and no spouse or partner present. About 24.5% of all households were made up of individuals and 9.8% had someone living alone who was 65 years of age or older.

There were 1,579 housing units, of which 7.4% were vacant. The homeowner vacancy rate was 2.6% and the rental vacancy rate was 7.2%.

Racial composition as of the 2020 census
Race	Number	Percent
White	3,385	91.7%
Black or African American	34	0.9%
American Indian and Alaska Native	7	0.2%
Asian	16	0.4%
Native Hawaiian and Other Pacific Islander	3	0.1%
Some other race	27	0.7%
Two or more races	221	6.0%
Hispanic or Latino (of any race)	74	2.0%

=== 2010 census ===
As of the census of 2010, there were 2,887 people, 1,101 households, and 791 families residing in the town. The population density was 1,422.2 inhabitants per square mile (549.1/km^{2}). There were 1,285 housing units at an average density of 633.0 per square mile (244.4/km^{2}). The racial makeup of the town was 97.9% White, 0.3% African American, 0.1% Native American, 0.1% Asian, 0.4% from other races, and 1.1% from two or more races. Hispanic or Latino of any race were 1.3% of the population.

There were 1,101 households, of which 37.1% had children under the age of 18 living with them, 52.4% were married couples living together, 14.4% had a female householder with no husband present, 5.0% had a male householder with no wife present, and 28.2% were non-families. 22.6% of all households were made up of individuals, and 9.1% had someone living alone who was 65 years of age or older. The average household size was 2.62 and the average family size was 3.06.

The median age in the town was 36 years. 27.2% of residents were under the age of 18; 7.8% were between the ages of 18 and 24; 27.2% were from 25 to 44; 26.2% were from 45 to 64; and 11.6% were 65 years of age or older. The gender makeup of the town was 48.8% male and 51.2% female.

=== 2000 census ===
As of the census of 2000, there were 3,094 people, 1,178 households, and 882 families residing in the town. The population density was 1,831.9 inhabitants per square mile (707.3/km^{2}). There were 1,267 housing units at an average density of 750.2 per square mile (289.7/km^{2}). The racial makeup of the town was 98.61% White, 0.36% African American, 0.13% Native American, 0.06% Asian, 0.06% Pacific Islander, 0.06% from other races, and 0.71% from two or more races. Hispanic or Latino of any race were 0.58% of the population.

There were 1,178 households, out of which 36.8% had children under the age of 18 living with them, 57.5% were married couples living together, 13.5% had a female householder with no husband present, and 25.1% were non-families. 21.0% of all households were made up of individuals, and 8.2% had someone living alone who was 65 years of age or older. The average household size was 2.63 and the average family size was 3.04.

In the town, the population was spread out, with 27.5% under the age of 18, 8.5% from 18 to 24, 32.2% from 25 to 44, 22.1% from 45 to 64, and 9.7% who were 65 years of age or older. The median age was 34 years. For every 100 females, there were 98.1 males. For every 100 females age 18 and over, there were 93.8 males.

The median income for a household in the town was $36,047, and the median income for a family was $39,500. Males had a median income of $29,074 versus $21,142 for females. The per capita income for the town was $16,172. About 10.1% of families and 14.1% of the population were below the poverty line, including 25.3% of those under age 18 and 7.7% of those age 65 or over.

== Law and government ==
Chandler uses the town council form of government, led by a five-member town council and a clerk-treasurer. The town council holds both legislative and executive powers while the clerk-treasurer is responsible for financial matters. Following staggered terms commencing in 2015, all are elected for four-year terms.

District	Council Member	First elected	Term ends	Political Party	Other titles
1	Cheryl Amos	2019	2023	Democratic Party	
2	Kim Burnett	2018	2022	Republican Party	
3	Tonya Wester	2019	2023	Republican Party	President
4	Ron Whitledge	2015	2022	Republican Party	Vice-President
At-Large	Sandy Elder	2019	2023	Democratic Party	

Some of the governmental functions are handled through Warrick County officials. The county maintains a small claims court that can handle some civil cases. The judge on the court is elected to a term of four years and must be a member of the Indiana Bar Association. The judge is assisted by a constable who is also elected to a four-year term. In some cases, court decisions can be appealed to the state level circuit court.

Chandler is represented by Vaneta Becker (District 50) in the Indiana State Senate. The town is located in the 8th District of Indiana (map) and served by U.S. Representative Larry Bucshon, a resident of Newburgh.

== Education ==
Chandler has a public library, a branch of the Ohio Township Public Library System. Chandler is a part of the Warrick County School Corporation, the school in Chandler specifically being Chandler Elementary School, home of the Vikings.

== Transportation ==
Warrick Area Transit System (WATS) provides bus service linking Chandler to the Metropolitan Evansville Transit System and the Evansville metro.
