= Jon Hilbert =

American football player (born 1975)

No. 4, 5, 9
- Position: Placekicker

Personal information
- Born: July 15, 1975 (age 51); West Palm Beach, Florida, U.S.

Career information
- High school: Boonville (Boonville, Indiana)
- College: Louisville
- NFL draft: 2000: undrafted

Career history
- Dallas Cowboys (2000)*; Buffalo Bills (2000)*; New Orleans Saints (2001)*; Dallas Cowboys (2001); Chicago Bears (2002)*; Carolina Panthers (2002)
- * Offseason or practice squad member only

Career NFL statistics
- Games played: 9
- Field goals: 11
- Field goal attempts: 18
- Field goal %: 61.1
- Longest field goal: 43
- Stats at Pro Football Reference

Jonathan Samuel Hilbert (born July 15, 1975) is an American former professional football player who was a placekicker in the National Football League (NFL) for the Dallas Cowboys and Carolina Panthers. He played college football for the Louisville Cardinals.

== Early life ==
Hilbert attended Boonville High School in Boonville, Indiana. As a senior, he averaged 43.9 yards-per-punt, receiving All-state, All-conference and All-area honors.

== College career ==
Hilbert accepted a football scholarship from the University of Louisville. After not seeing action in 1994, he spent the 1995 season rehabilitating a knee injury. As a freshman in 1996, he made his only extra point attempt, while being a backup behind David Akers.

As a sophomore, he was named the starter at placekicker after Akers graduated, making 6-of-7 field goal attempts and 23-of-24 extra point attempts. As a junior, he set a school record by making 50 extra point attempts, while connecting on 5-of-8 field goal attempts and scoring 65 points (third on the team).

As a senior, he made 11-of-18 field goals and 40-of-43 extra points, finishing with 73 points (second on the team).

== Professional career ==
=== Dallas Cowboys (first stint) ===
Hilbert was signed as an undrafted free agent by the Dallas Cowboys after the 2000 NFL draft on April 17. He was released in July.

=== Buffalo Bills ===
On July 31, 2000, he signed as a free agent with the Buffalo Bills. On August 21, after not being able to pass incumbent Steve Christie on the depth chart.

=== New Orleans Saints ===
On March 28, 2001, he was signed as a free agent by the New Orleans Saints. On August 28, he was released after losing the kicking competition against John Carney.

=== Dallas Cowboys (second stint) ===
On November 13, 2001, Hilbert was signed by the Dallas Cowboys. He kicked in eight games while replacing an injured Tim Seder, who was out for the season. He wasn't re-signed at the end of the year.

=== Chicago Bears ===
On March, 14, 2002, he was signed by the Chicago Bears, but was released on August 25, when they decided to keep incumbent kicker Paul Edinger.

=== Carolina Panthers ===
On September 19, 2002, the Carolina Panthers signed Hilbert to their practice squad. He was later elevated to the active roster after they lost starting kicker John Kasay due to hernia surgery. After missing two field goals in a game versus the Minnesota Vikings and not kicking well in practice, Hilbert was replaced by kicker Shayne Graham and waived on September 27.
