= Travis Williams (tailback) =

American football player (1892–1986)

Profile
- Position: Tailback / Halfback

Personal information
- Born: January 5, 1892; Boonville, Indiana
- Died: November 28, 1986 (aged 94); Evansville, Indiana
- Listed height: 6 ft 0 in (1.83 m)
- Listed weight: 200 lb (91 kg)

Career information
- High school: Boonville (IN)
- College: Indiana

Career history
- Evansville Crimson Giants (1921–1922)
- Stats at Pro Football Reference

Travis Bill Williams (January 5, 1892 – November 28, 1986) was a professional football player in the early 1920s. He played in the early National Football League for the Evansville Crimson Giants. Prior to playing pro football, Williams played at the college level at Indiana University.
