= Yockey =

Yockey may refer to:

== People ==
- Chauncey W. Yockey (1879–1936), American politician
- Donald J. Yockey, former United States Department of Defense Executive
- Hubert Yockey (1916–2016), American information theorist
- Francis Parker Yockey (1917–1960), American far-right political author
- Jackie Mitchum-Yockey, one time president and CEO of High Adventure Ministries
- Jim Yockey, member of the Malvern High School (Ohio, United States) Athletic Hall of Fame
- Josh Yockey, among the first employees of the American company Newsvine
- Marcia Yockey (1923–2000), American weathercaster
- Ross Yockey (1943–2008), American author and historian
- Steve Yockey, American screenwriter and producer

== Places ==
- Yockey, Indiana, a small town in the United States

== See also ==
- Homonyms
  - Yaqui
  - Tom Yawkey
  - Brian Yorkey
