= Benjamin Bosse =

Mayor of Evansville, Indiana (1875–1922)

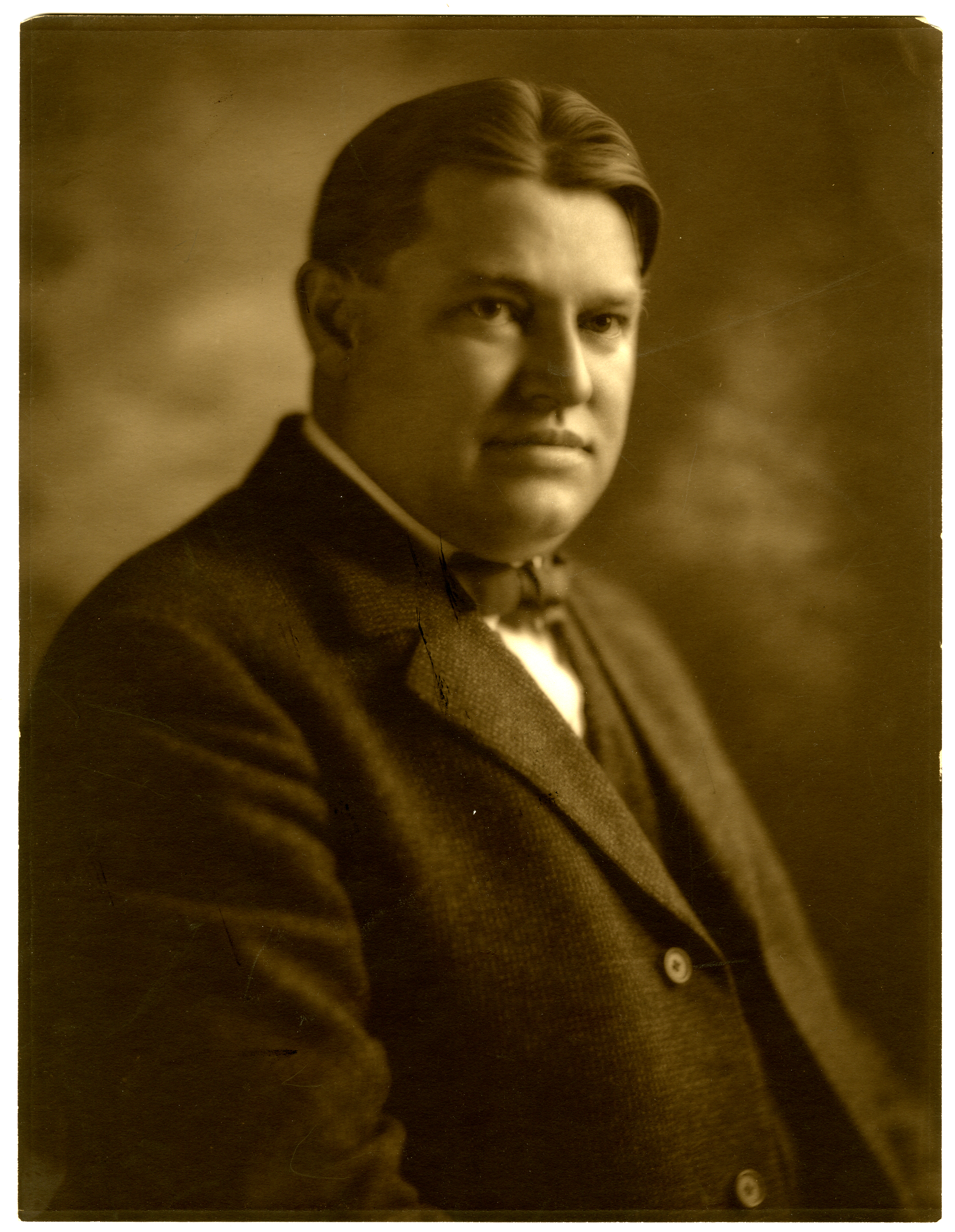
- Born: November 1, 1874; Evansville, Indiana
- Died: April 4, 1922 (aged 47); Evansville, Indiana
- Occupations: Mayor of Evansville, Indiana
- Years active: 1913–1922
- Political party: Democrat
- Spouse: Anna Schlensker
- Parent(s): Henry and Carolyn Bosse

Benjamin Bosse (November 1, 1875 – April 22, 1922) was an American politician, manufacturer, and businessman who served as the 19th mayor of Evansville, Indiana, from 1914 until his death in 1922. He died during his third term as Mayor.

During his term as mayor, Bosse oversaw the replacement of horse-drawn fire carriages, the relocation of the Evansville Police Department, the brick paving of most downtown streets, and the construction of several new public markets. The city's public recreation department was also formed, resulting in the construction of Evansville’s first public playgrounds, tennis courts and swimming pools. Bosse was also a supporter of Frank Fausch, who founded Evansville's NFL team, the Evansville Crimson Giants.

== Early life ==
Bosse was born on November 1, 1875, to German-American civil engineer Henry Bosse and Caroline L. Schlensker. Spending much of his early childhood in Scott Township, Bosse moved to Evansville at age 14. At that same age, he had his first job as a horse-drawn grocery delivery cart driver.

== See also ==
- Benjamin Bosse High School
- Bosse Field
- Evansville Crimson Giants
