= Earl Warweg =

American football player and architect (1892–1979)

Profile
- Position: Halfback

Personal information
- Born: January 11, 1892; Indianapolis, Indiana, U.S.
- Died: December 7, 1979 (aged 87); Newburgh, Indiana, U.S.
- Listed height: 5 ft 6 in (1.68 m)
- Listed weight: 145 lb (66 kg)

Career information
- College: None

Career history
- Evansville Crimson Giants (1921)
- Stats at Pro Football Reference

Earl Oscar Warweg (January 11, 1892 – December 7, 1979) was an American football player and architect.

Prior to the formation of the National Football League (NFL) (originally known as the American Professional Football Association), Warweg played semi-pro football for five years in Indianapolis, Indiana. He also competed as a featherweight wrestler at 125 pounds and taught wrestling in Indianapolis.

In August 1921, he signed a contract to play in the APFA for the Evansville Crimson Giants. He appeared in one game for the Crimson Giants during their 1921 season.

During World War II, Warweg served in the military. He was also an architect who designed many buildings in and around Evansville, Indiana. His works include Mater Dei High School, East Side Christian Church, Ross Center, Sterling Brewery, Cameron House, and the first shopping center in Evansville. He also worked on the restoration of Camp Koch in Cannelton, Indiana, and several buildings in New Harmony, Indiana. He died in 1979 at his home in Newburgh, Indiana.
