= Henderson Area Rapid Transit =

Provider of mass transportation in Henderson County, Kentucky

- Founded: 1957
- Headquarters: 401 N. Elm St.
- Locale: Henderson, Kentucky
- Service area: Henderson County, Kentucky
- Service type: Bus service, paratransit
- Routes: 6
- Hubs: Third and Main Transfer Point
- Fleet: 3 buses
- Annual ridership: 119,241 (2019)
- Website: Henderson Area Rapid Transit

Henderson Area Rapid Transit (HART) is the primary provider of mass transportation in Henderson, Kentucky with six routes serving the region. As of 2019, the system provided 119,241 rides over 16,112 annual vehicle revenue hours with 3 buses and 2 paratransit vehicles.

== History ==
Public transit in Henderson began with horsecars in 1886, with the Henderson Street Railway Co. In 1895, the horsecars were replaced with streetcars, which in turn were replaced by buses in 1929. The city took over operations in 1957. In January 2021, bus service was reduced due to staffing issues, service did not fully resume until December of that year.

== Service ==
Henderson Area Rapid Transit operates 6 bus routes on a pulse system with all routes serving the Third and Main Transfer Point.

Hours of operation for the system are Monday through Saturday from 6:00 A.M. to 5:30 P.M. There is no service on Sundays. Regular fares are $0.50.

=== Routes ===
- Shopper Shuttle
- East Gate
- Weaverton
- East End
- North
- College Shuttle

== Fixed route ridership ==
The ridership statistics shown here are of fixed route services only and do not include demand response services.

== See also ==
- List of bus transit systems in the United States
- Metropolitan Evansville Transit System
