= Boonville High School =

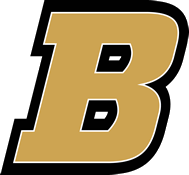

Location
- 300 North 1st Street; Boonville, Warrick County, Indiana 47601; United States; 38.053118°N 87.277440°W

Information
- Type: Public high school
- Established: 1958
- School district: Warrick County School Corporation
- Principal: Julie Kemp (2024-present)
- Teaching staff: 69.70 (FTE)
- Grades: 9-12
- Enrollment: 902 (2025-2026)
- Student to teacher ratio: 17.18
- Color
- Athletics conference: PAC
- Team name: Pioneers
- Website: Boonville High School

Boonville High School is a public high school located in Boonville, Indiana. The school is one of three high schools in Warrick County, that make up the Warrick County School Corporation.

== About ==
Boonville High School, Warrick County's oldest high school, was built in 1958 and is located on a 34-acre site that borders North First Street in the city of Boonville. A series of additions and remodeling were completed in 1976, 1983, 2000, and 2023. The band room, auditorium, kitchen and cafeteria were renovated in 1983. New additions at that time included an indoor swimming pool with spectator seating, adjacent locker and dressing rooms, faculty office space and a gymnasium. The 2000 construction project renovated all existing classrooms and added a new technology education wing, art classrooms, an agricultural science facility and a greenhouse. Technology improvements were also part of the 2000 project. T

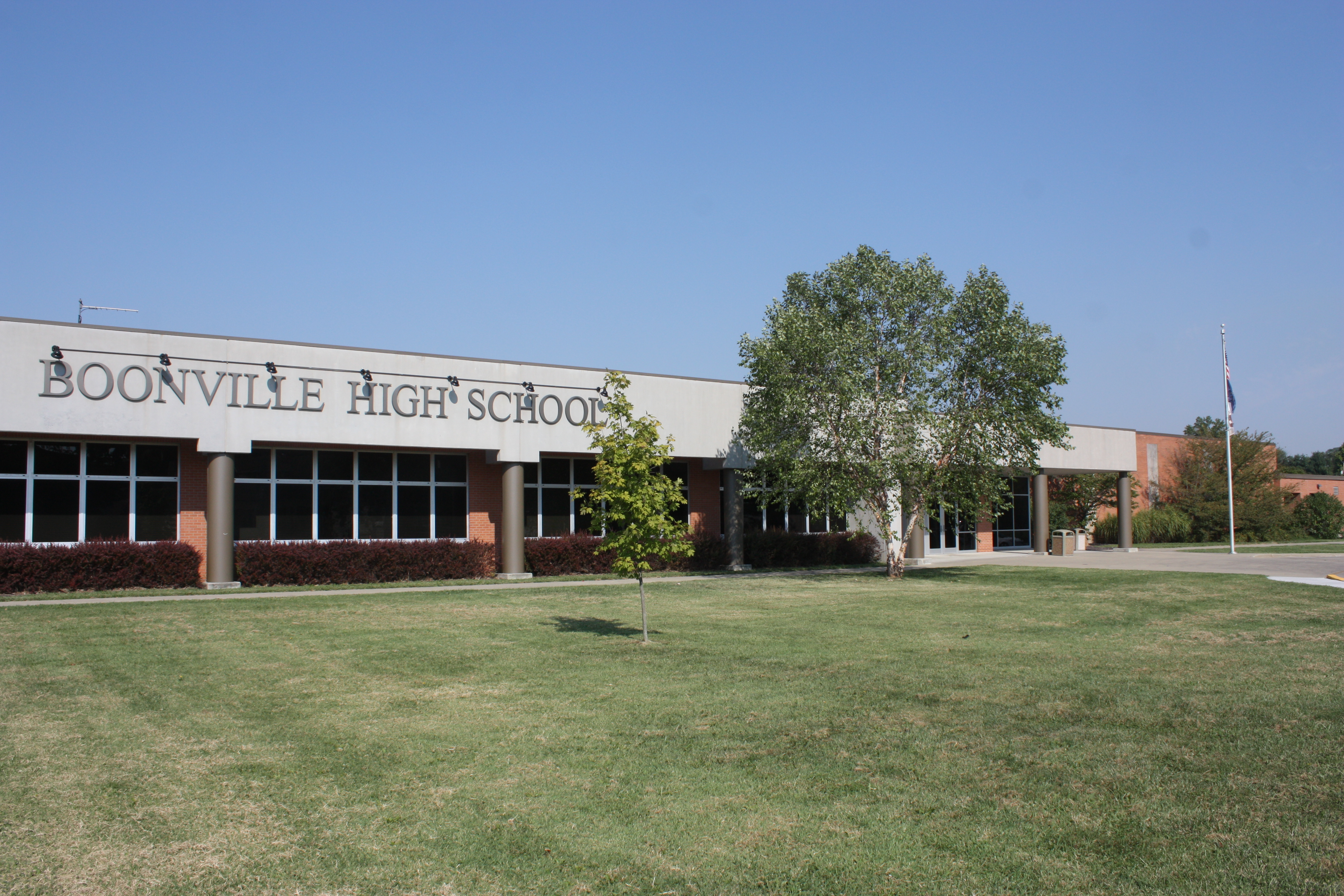
Boonville High School

The school is accredited by the North Central Association of Colleges and Schools and is a member of the Pocket Athletic Conference.

== Notable alumni ==
- Bibbles Bawel, former NFL player
- James A. Hemenway, former United States Congressman and Senator from Indiana.
- Jon Hilbert, former NFL player
- Jeremy Spencer, Five Finger Death Punch drummer.
- Travis Williams, former NFL player
- Dustin Ransom, professional musician

== See also ==
- List of high schools in Indiana
