= Mark Ingle =

American football player and attorney (1891–1950)

Profile
- Position: Guard

Personal information
- Born: August 13, 1891; Kingfisher County, Oklahoma, U.S.
- Died: c. 1950 (aged 58–59); Oklahoma City, Oklahoma, U.S.

Career information
- College: Indiana

Career history
- Evansville Ex-Collegians (1920); Evansville Crimson Giants (1921)
- Stats at Pro Football Reference

Mark B. Ingle was an attorney as well as a professional football player in the early 1920s. Ingle played in the National Football League (NFL) in 1921 for the Evansville Crimson Giants. He was also a co-founder of the team, along with Frank Fausch, and served as the team's vice-president.

Prior to establishing the Crimson Giants, Ingle played for the semi-pro Evansville Ex-Collegians in 1920. He died in either 1949 or 1950 in Oklahoma City, Oklahoma.
