= Menz Lindsey =

American attorney and football player (1897–1961)

Profile
- Position: Quarterback

Personal information
- Born: July 25, 1897; Boonville, Indiana
- Died: September 20, 1961 (aged 64)
- Listed height: 5 ft 6 in (1.68 m)
- Listed weight: 130 lb (59 kg)

Career information
- College: Wabash College

Career history
- Evansville Ex-Collegians (1920); Evansville Crimson Giants (1921); Evansville Pros (1922)
- Stats at Pro Football Reference

Ellis Menzies Lindsey (July 25, 1897 – September 20, 1961) was an attorney as well as a professional football player in the early 1920s. Lindsey was a quarterback for the Evansville Crimson Giants of the National Football League in 1921. He was also a co-manager of the semi-pro Evansville Ex-Collegians in 1920, before joining the Crimson Giants. After a dispute with Crimson Giants' owner Frank Fausch, Lindsey tried to re-establish the Ex-Collegians team. The new team was back by Evansville's baseball club and named the Evansville Pros. However that team last only two games before folding.

== Career ==
Lindsey as the manager and quarterback of the Ex-Collegians, was in charge of promoting the team. In 1920, he tried to schedule a Christmas Day game between the Ex-Collegians and the Canton Bulldogs. The deal never materialized. During the 1920 season, a group of local investors tried to purchase the Ex-Collegians, however Lindsey refused to give up the team, due to differences between the players and the investors.

When Frank Fausch established his Crimson Giants in 1921, many of the Ex-Collegians stayed loyal to Lindsey. Once Fausch gained the only lease to Bosse Field, however, the city's only football field, Lindsey and the Ex-Collegians joined the team. During the 1921 season, scheduling issues led to games being cancelled, which resulted in players not being paid. Lindsey established a "Committee of Five", which forced Fausch from his manager position. However, since Fausch had obtained the NFL franchise rights, and was therefore the franchise's owner, he retook his team in 1922. Meanwhile, Lindsey established a new semi-pro team, the Evansville Pros. He played quarterback for the team before it folded after just two games.
