= Bourbon Bondurant =

American football player (1898–1971)

Bourban Bondurant
Profile
- Positions: End, Tackle, Halfback

Personal information
- Born: February 18, 1898; Brandenburg, Kentucky, U.S.
- Died: September 4, 1971 (aged 73); Scottsdale, Arizona, U.S.
- Listed height: 6 ft 1 in (1.85 m)
- Listed weight: 202 lb (92 kg)

Career information
- College: DePauw

Career history
- 1920: Fort Wayne Friars
- 1921–1922: Evansville Crimson Giants
- 1922: Chicago Bears

Bourbon Patch Bondurant (February 18, 1898 - September 4, 1971) was an American professional football player during the early 1920s. He played in the early National Football League for the Evansville Crimson Giants and the Chicago Bears. Before joining the Evansville Crimson Giants Bondurant worked as an insurance agent. He had previously played professional football with the Fort Wayne Friars.

Bourbon played at the college level for DePauw University and was the team's captain in 1917.
