= List of Indiana state historical markers in Warrick County =

Location of Warrick County in Indiana

This is a list of the Indiana state historical markers in Warrick County.

This is intended to be a detailed table of the official state historical marker placed in Warrick County, Indiana, United States by the Indiana Historical Bureau. The location of the historical marker and its latitude and longitude coordinates are included below when available, along with its name, year of placement, and topics as recorded by the Historical Bureau. There is 1 historical marker located in Warrick County.

== Historical markers ==
| Marker title | Image | Year placed | Location | Topics |
|---|---|---|---|---|
| Angel Mounds | | 1966 | In front of the interpretive center at Angel Mounds State Historic Site, at 8215 Pollack Avenue in Evansville; 37°56′41″N 87°27′7″W | American Indian/Native American |

== See also ==
- List of Indiana state historical markers
- National Register of Historic Places listings in Warrick County, Indiana
