= Joe Windbiel =

American football player (1897–1971)

Profile
- Position: Center

Personal information
- Born: March 6, 1897; Chicago, Illinois, U.S.
- Died: June 25, 1971 (aged 74); Fort Lauderdale, Florida, U.S.
- Listed height: 6 ft 1 in (1.85 m)
- Listed weight: 220 lb (100 kg)

Career information
- College: St. Mary's (OH)

Career history
- Detroit Heralds (c. 1917–1919); Evansville Crimson Giants (1921)
- Stats at Pro Football Reference

Joseph C. Windbiel Jr. (March 6, 1897 – June 25, 1971) was a professional football player who played in the American Professional Football Association (AFPA)—now known as the National Football League (NFL)—with the Evansville Crimson Giants during the 1921 season. He also reportedly played for the Detroit Heralds before the team joined the NFL in 1920. Windbiel played college football at St. Mary's College—now known as the University of Dayton—where was a three-time letterman (1913, 1915, 1916) and the captain of the school's 1916 team.

Windbiel was also a high school football coach in Evansville, Indiana. For the final 19 years of life, he resided in Fort Lauderdale, Florida, where he died on June 25, 1971, at Holy Cross Hospital.
