= Barbara Maier Gustern =

American vocal coach (1935–2022)

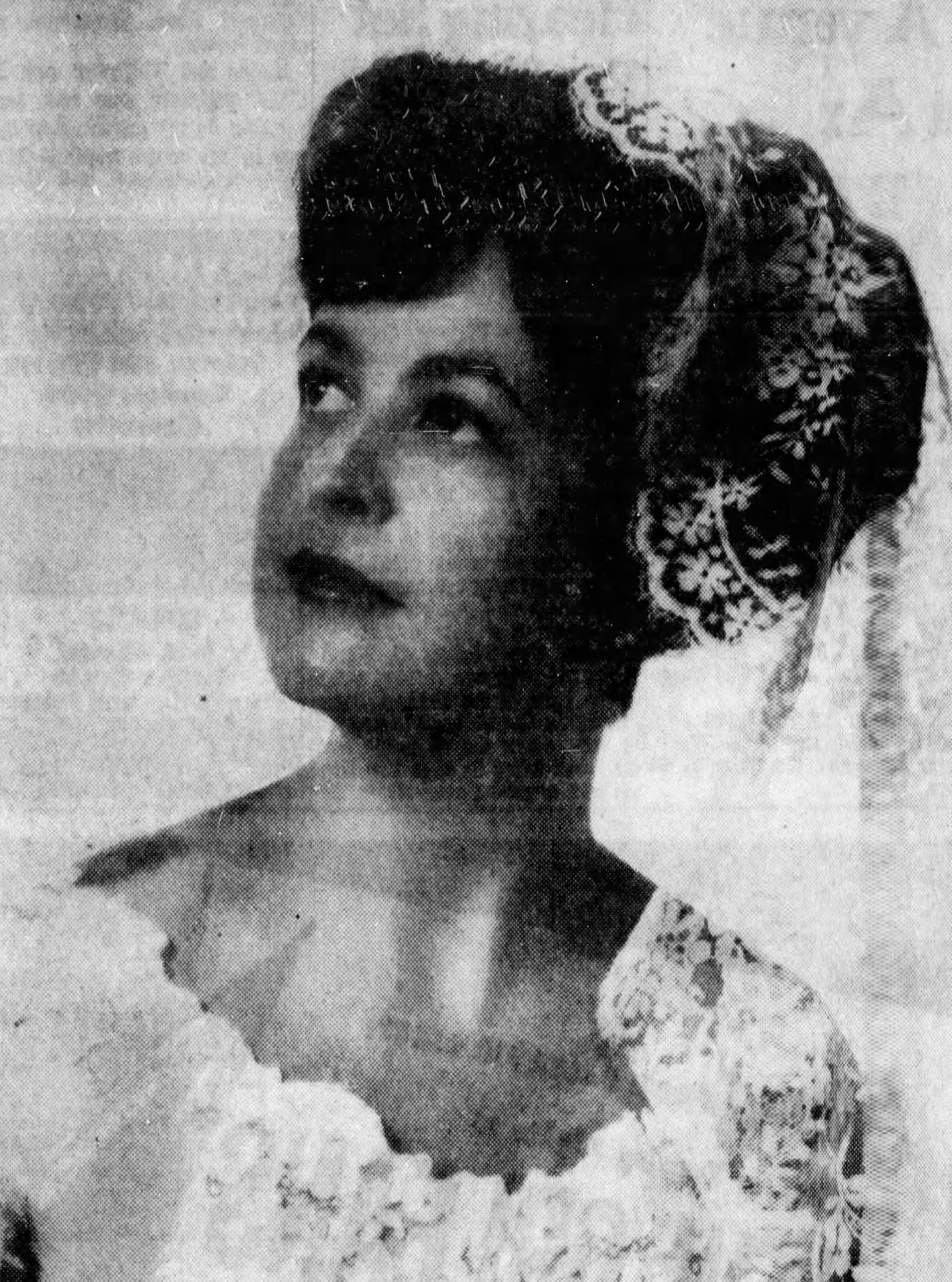
- Maier Gustern in 1963
- Born: Barbara Joan Maier; February 10, 1935; Boonville, Indiana, U.S.
- Died: March 15, 2022 (aged 87); Bellevue Hospital, Manhattan, New York U.S.
- Education: DePauw University; Columbia University
- Occupations: Vocal coach, singer

Barbara Joan Gustern (née Maier; February 10, 1935 – March 15, 2022) was an American vocal coach and singer. She had many noted students, including Blondie singer Debbie Harry, Taylor Mac, Justin Vivian Bond, Diamanda Galás, and Kathleen Hanna.

== Biography ==
Barbara Joan Maier was raised in Boonville, Indiana. She was the daughter of Charles E. Maier and Gladys Hester Maier. She completed a B.A. from DePauw University and a master's degree in psychology at Columbia University. She worked briefly in psychology before performing in musicals.

Maier met her future husband Josef Donald Gustern, the son of Louis and Helen Gustern of New York, while singing at the Conservative Synagogue Adath Israel of Riverdale. They married on July 27, 1963, at her parents' home in Boonville, Indiana. In August 1964, Gustern and her husband were cast in The Threepenny Opera at the Ephrata Star Playhouse. When she was 40, she began teaching at the American Musical and Dramatic Academy. Gustern had many noted students, including Blondie singer Debbie Harry, Taylor Mac, Justin Vivian Bond, Diamanda Galas, and Kathleen Hanna.

=== Death and aftermath ===
On March 10, 2022, Gustern sustained a head injury after being pushed to the ground by a woman outside of her apartment building in Chelsea, Manhattan. While she remained conscious in the immediate aftermath and was able to give information to the police, her health deteriorated soon after, and she was taken to Bellevue Hospital for surgery, where it was found that she had suffered severe brain damage. She died from her injuries five days after the attack, on March 15, at the age of 87.

On March 22, 2022, a 26-year-old woman, Lauren Pazienza, turned herself in to authorities in connection to Gustern's death, and was charged with manslaughter. Prosecutors indicated that the charges could be upgraded to murder. Pazienza pleaded guilty to the charges of first-degree manslaughter on August 23, 2023, for which she agreed to serve eight years in prison. A judge later extended the sentence to eight years and six months, stating that she was "unconvinced" that Pazienza had taken responsibility for her actions.
