= Newburgh, Indiana =

Town in Indiana, United States,

- Town
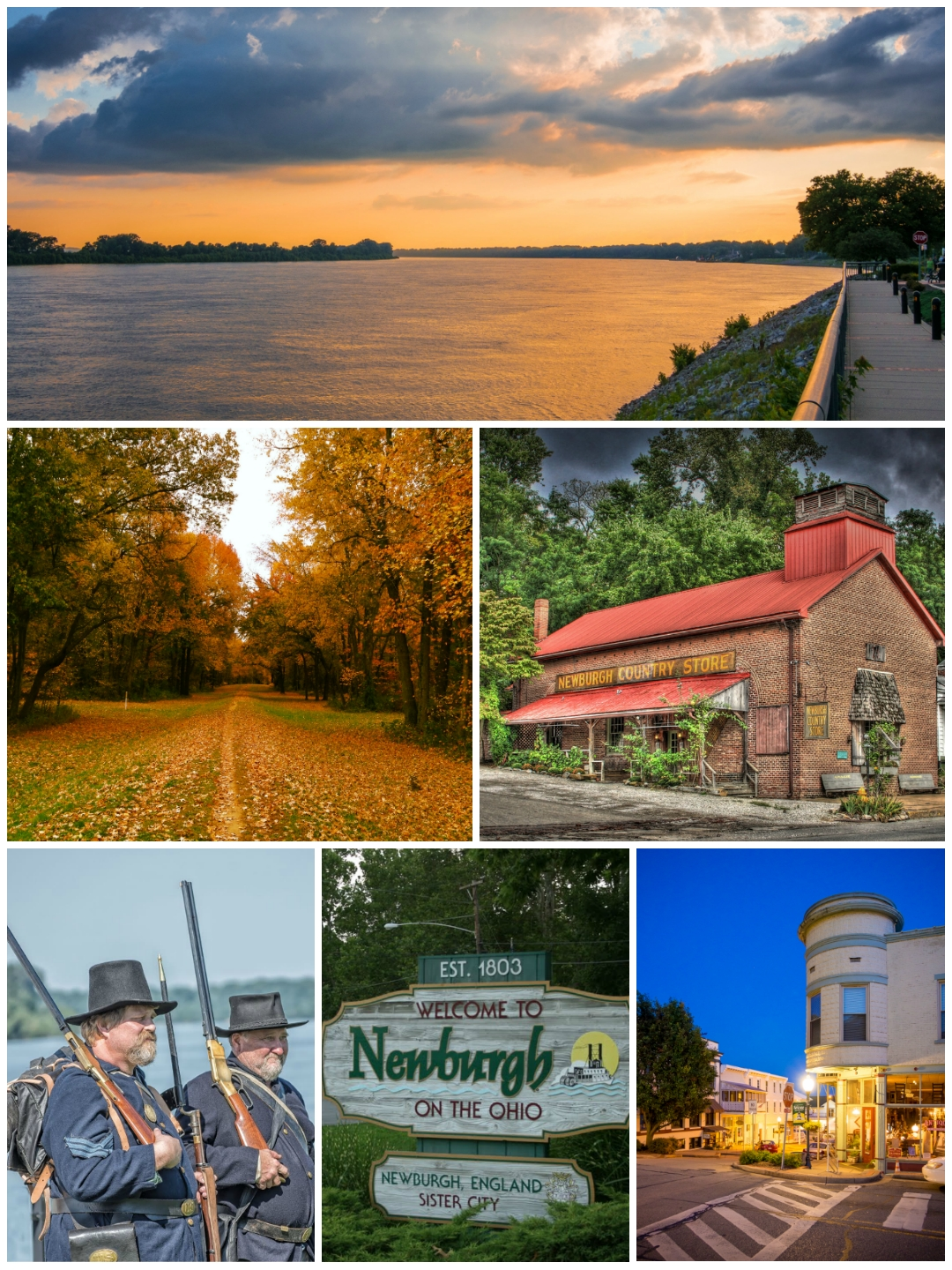
- Top to bottom, left to right: Newburgh riverfront, Angel Mounds, Newburgh Country Store, re-enactors of the Newburgh Raid, town welcome sign, and Exchange Hotel

- Logo

- Location of Newburgh in Warrick County, Indiana
- Coordinates: 37°56′48″N 87°24′13″W
- Country: United States
- State: Indiana
- County: Warrick
- Township: Ohio
- Established: 1829

Area
  - Total: 1.49 sq mi (3.87 km^{2})
  - Land: 1.49 sq mi (3.86 km^{2})
  - Water: 0 sq mi (0.00 km^{2})
- Elevation: 400 ft (120 m)

Population (2020)
  - Total: 3,344
  - Density: 2,241.1/sq mi (865.31/km^{2})
- Time zone: UTC-6 (Central (CST))
  - Summer (DST): UTC-5 (CDT)
- ZIP codes: 47629-47630
- Area code: 812
- FIPS code: 18-52650
- GNIS feature ID: 2396812
- Website: www.newburgh-in.gov

Newburgh is an incorporated town in Ohio Township, Warrick County, Indiana, United States, along the Ohio River. As of the 2020 census, Newburgh had a population of 3,344. The town is part of the larger Evansville metropolitan area, and Ohio Township, which Newburgh shares with nearby Chandler, includes the town. It is the easternmost suburb of Evansville.

The area has been inhabited by various cultures, dating back at least 10,000 years. Angel Mounds was a permanent settlement of the Mississippian culture from 1000 AD to around 1400 AD. By 1850, Newburgh was one of the larger riverports between Cincinnati and New Orleans, and was the first town north of the Mason–Dixon line to be captured by Confederate forces during the Newburgh Raid during the American Civil War. Shortly after the mid-nineteenth century, Newburgh's growth leveled off until the economic boom of the 1960s and 1970s, resulting in substantial growth as a bedroom community for families looking for new housing developments near Evansville.

Today, Newburgh is locally known for its historic downtown district that features a number of specialty stores, antique shops, and restaurants along its riverfront. The town remains a popular residential community for people working in or near Evansville.

== History ==
As a town situated on the fertile banks of the Ohio River, Newburgh has a long history of human activity. Western explorers first arrived in the area in the 17th century. For centuries prior to that, it had been inhabited by the Shawnee people and was near the center of prehistoric Mississippian culture as late as 1450 A.D. Evidence of this prehistoric society remains today at Angel Mounds, a National Historic Landmark, and Ellerbusch site, both approximately two miles west of Newburgh.

The principal founders of Newburgh are John Sprinkle and Abner Luce. Sprinkle, a businessman of German descent, landed in Newburgh in the spring of 1803, thirteen years before Indiana entered the Union as the 19th state. He secured land grants in 1812 and in 1818 platted what became known as Sprinklesburgh (sometimes called "Mount Pleasant"). It was the first town in Warrick County. The original plat of Sprinklesburgh consisted of about 12 blocks immediately west of today's downtown Newburgh.

Abner Luce founded Newburgh almost directly to the east of Sprinklesburgh in 1829. In 1841, Luce's plat was merged with Sprinkelsburgh and the name of the town was changed to Newburgh. However, it was Samuel Short's land, a strip on the block west of State Street, that now has some of the most visible and important land in modern downtown Newburgh.

By 1850, the town had grown to be one of the largest riverports on the Ohio-Mississippi River between Cincinnati and New Orleans. Much of its growth in this time period was due to coal mining and its beneficial location on the Ohio River. The first underground mine shaft in Indiana was sunk in Newburgh in 1850. However, when the national railway system came to southern Indiana, it bypassed Newburgh completely in favor of Evansville, beginning a permanent shift in regional economic dominance.

According to a number of historical sources, Newburgh was a prominent stop on the Underground Railroad between the mouth of the Little Pigeon River and Lake Michigan. On July 18, 1862, Newburgh was the first town north of the Mason–Dixon line to be captured by the Confederate forces during the American Civil War in what would come to be known as the Newburgh Raid. Colonel Adam "Stovepipe" Johnson, with a partisan band, crossed the Ohio River and confiscated supplies and ammunition without a shot being fired. The Confederates would have been unable to shell the city (as promised) had Newburgh put up a fight. The Confederates' cannons were an assemblage of a stove pipe, charred log, and wagon wheels. The raid convinced the federal government that it was necessary to supply Indiana with a permanent force of regular Union Army soldiers to counter future raids. Many of the structures used in this raid are still standing, including the Exchange Hotel.

Newburgh's economy benefited from the construction of the Lock and Dam 47 in the 1920s, and its replacement in 1974 with the Newburgh Lock and Dam. The town also benefited from the arrival, and later expansions, of the Aluminum Company of America (ALCOA), built in 1957. Many of Newburgh's residents are commuters to businesses and industries in Evansville and surrounding areas.

In 1994, Newburgh leaders planned to annex large areas that would have extended town limits to Frame Road (west) and SR 66 (north and east). This would have given Newburgh the ability to plan land use for large open, undeveloped areas. However, by 2001, the town's leadership shifted its focus away from annexation toward planning in the well-established current town limits.

On November 6, 2005, the Evansville Tornado of November 2005 caused 25 deaths in nearby Evansville. Newburgh suffered extensive property damage and some injuries but suffered no fatalities during the 2:06 AM tornadic event.

The Old Newburgh Presbyterian Church and Original Newburgh Historic District are listed on the National Register of Historic Places.

== Geography ==
Newburgh is located at 37°56′48″N 87°24′13″W. According to the 2010 census, Newburgh has a total area of 1.41 square miles (3.65 km^{2}), of land. Plans to expand town limits through annexation have been abandoned in favor of planning and development within the current town limits.

Newburgh faces the Ohio River along its southern boundary. Much of the town is protected from flood risk by locks and dams completed in the 1960s. Notable landmarks on the west side are the Angel Mounds Historic Site, a burial site said to have been abandoned centuries prior.

=== Architecture ===
Many of Newburgh's prominent and notable buildings can be found in the Original Newburgh Historic District and developed between 1850 and 1930. Numerous buildings have been nominated to the National Register of Historic Places and satisfy the basic criteria of possessing outstanding significance on the national, state, or local level for history, architecture, environment, and/or integrity. The town's architecture includes representative examples of Italianate, Greek Revival, and Classical Revival style architecture.

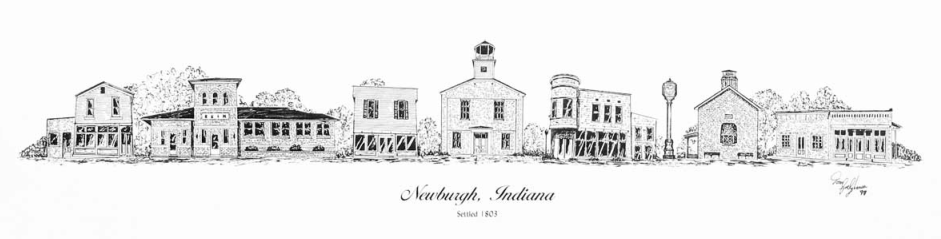
A sketch of prominent buildings in Newburgh, Indiana.

=== Climate ===
The climate in this area is characterized by hot, humid summers and cool to mild winters. According to the Köppen Climate Classification system, Newburgh has a humid subtropical climate (abbrev. CFA) on climate maps.

== Law and government ==
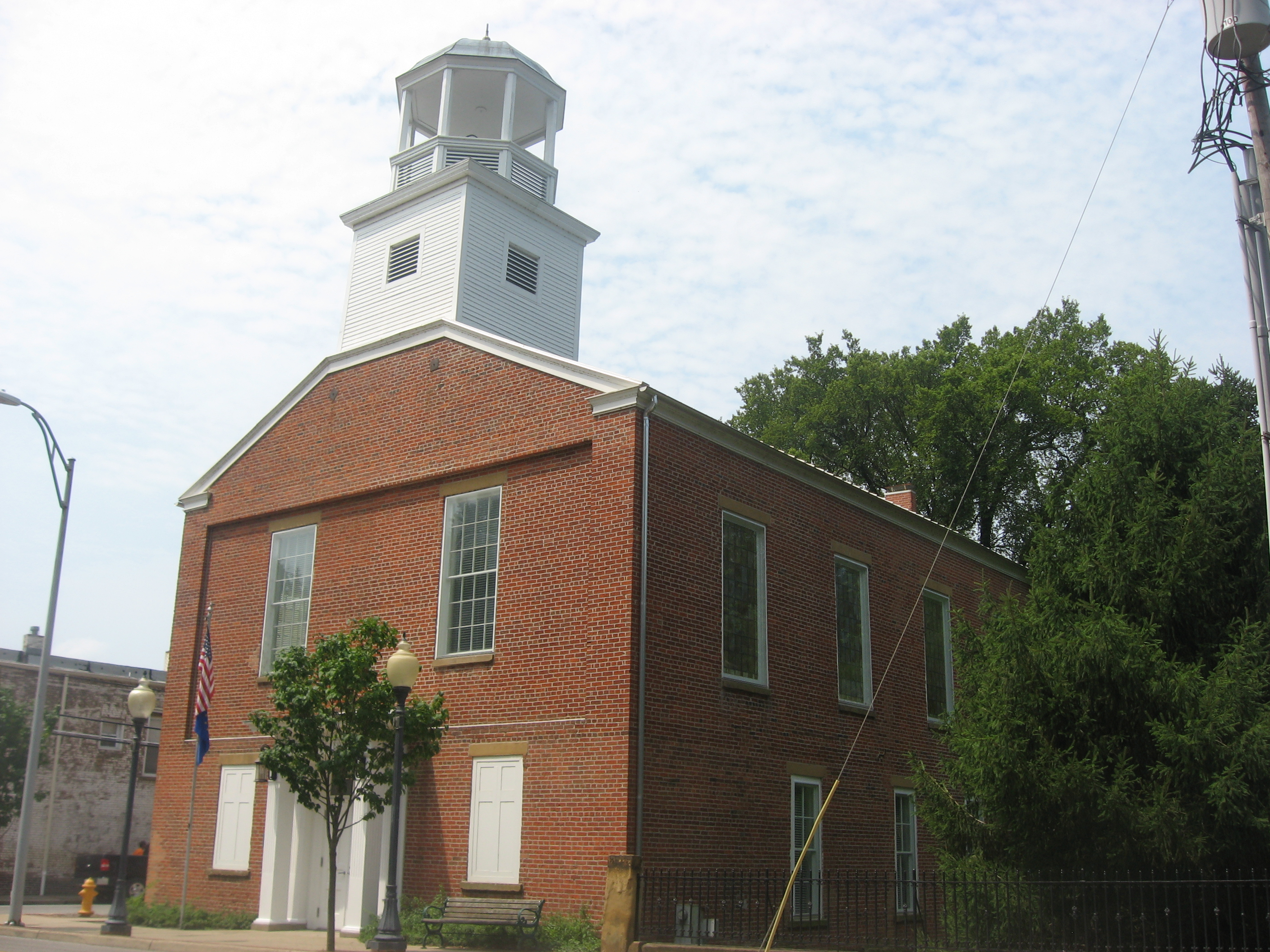
The Old Newburgh Presbyterian Church

Newburgh uses the council-manager form of government, led by a five-member town council and a clerk-treasurer. The town council holds both legislative and executive powers while the clerk-treasurer is responsible for financial matters. All are elected for four-year terms. The council employs and oversees a town manager who is responsible for municipal personnel, budget, and day-to-day operations of the town government.

District	Council member	First elected	Term ends	Political party	Other titles
1	William F. Kavanaugh	2011	2019	Democratic Party	President
2	Allyson E. Claybourn	2018	2022	Democratic Party	
3	Stacie Krieger	2015	2019	Republican Party	Second Vice President
4	Anne Rust Aurand	2011	2019	Republican Party	
At-large	Carol Schaefer	2018	2022	Republican Party	

Some of the governmental functions are handled through Warrick County officials. The county maintains a small claims court that is fit for small, civil cases. The judge on the court is elected to a term of four years and must be a member of the Indiana Bar Association. The judge is assisted by a constable who is also elected to a four-year term. In some cases, court decisions can be appealed to the state level circuit court.

Newburgh is represented by Holli Sullivan (District 78) in the Indiana State House of Representatives and Vaneta Becker (District 50) in the Indiana State Senate. The town is located in the 8th District of Indiana (map) and served by U.S. Representative Larry Bucshon, a resident of Newburgh.

== Demographics ==
Historical population
Census	Pop.	Note	%±
1850	526		—
1860	999		89.9%
1870	1,464		46.5%
1880	1,282		−12.4%
1890	1,046		−18.4%
1900	1,371		31.1%
1910	1,097		−20.0%
1920	1,295		18.0%
1930	1,262		−2.5%
1940	1,374		8.9%
1950	1,324		−3.6%
1960	1,450		9.5%
1970	2,302		58.8%
1980	2,906		26.2%
1990	2,880		−0.9%
2000	3,088		7.2%
2010	3,325		7.7%
2020	3,344		0.6%
U.S. Decennial Census

=== 2020 census ===
As of the 2020 census, Newburgh had a population of 3,344. The median age was 44.7 years. 20.7% of residents were under the age of 18 and 20.5% of residents were 65 years of age or older. For every 100 females there were 91.3 males, and for every 100 females age 18 and over there were 90.7 males age 18 and over.

100.0% of residents lived in urban areas, while 0.0% lived in rural areas.

There were 1,492 households in Newburgh, of which 26.7% had children under the age of 18 living in them. Of all households, 48.3% were married-couple households, 18.4% were households with a male householder and no spouse or partner present, and 28.2% were households with a female householder and no spouse or partner present. About 31.8% of all households were made up of individuals and 13.0% had someone living alone who was 65 years of age or older.

There were 1,623 housing units, of which 8.1% were vacant. The homeowner vacancy rate was 2.3% and the rental vacancy rate was 11.3%.

Racial composition as of the 2020 census
Race	Number	Percent
White	3,009	90.0%
Black or African American	45	1.3%
American Indian and Alaska Native	12	0.4%
Asian	80	2.4%
Native Hawaiian and Other Pacific Islander	0	0.0%
Some other race	35	1.0%
Two or more races	163	4.9%
Hispanic or Latino (of any race)	93	2.8%

=== 2010 census ===
As of the census of 2010, there were 3,325 people, 1,455 households, and 935 families residing in the town. The population density was 2,358.2 inhabitants per square mile (910.5/km^{2}). There were 1,585 housing units at an average density of 1,124.1 per square mile (434.0/km^{2}). The racial makeup of the town was 94.2% White, 1.4% African American, 0.1% Native American, 2.0% Asian, 0.9% from other races, and 1.4% from two or more races. Hispanic or Latino people of any race were 2.0% of the population.

There were 1,455 households, of which 28.2% had children under the age of 18 living with them, 51.1% were married couples living together, 9.2% had a female householder with no husband present, 3.9% had a male householder with no wife present, and 35.7% were non-families. 31.0% of all households were made up of individuals, and 9.7% had someone living alone who was 65 years of age or older. The average household size was 2.28 and the average family size was 2.85.

The median age in the town was 42.1 years. 22.4% of residents were under the age of 18; 6.9% were between the ages of 18 and 24; 24.6% were from 25 to 44; 31.8% were from 45 to 64; and 14.4% were 65 years of age or older. The gender makeup of the town was 48.2% male and 51.8% female.

=== 2000 census ===
As of the census of 2000, there were 3,088 people, 1,369 households, and 889 families residing in the town. The population density was 2,274.6 inhabitants per square mile (878.2/km^{2}). There were 1,478 housing units at an average density of 1,088.7 per square mile (420.3/km^{2}). The racial makeup of the town was 97.38% White, 1.17% African American, 0.03% Native American, 0.36% Asian, 0.32% from other races, and 0.74% from two or more races. Hispanic or Latino people of any race were 0.58% of the population.

There were 1,369 households, out of which 27.9% had children under the age of 18 living with them, 52.8% were married couples living together, 9.5% had a female householder with no husband present, and 35.0% were non-families. 29.9% of all households were made up of individuals, and 8.7% had someone living alone who was 65 years of age or older. The average household size was 2.24 and the average family size was 2.79.

In the town, the population was spread out, with 22.2% under the age of 18, 7.7% from 18 to 24, 29.7% from 25 to 44, 28.0% from 45 to 64, and 12.4% who were 65 years of age or older. The median age was 39 years. For every 100 females, there were 92.9 males. For every 100 females aged 18 and over, there were 91.5 males.

The median income for a household in the town was $41,581, and the median income for a family was $53,854. Males had a median income of $41,538 versus $24,662 for females. The per capita income for the town was $24,537. None of the families and 2.5% of the population were living below the poverty line, including no under eighteens and 5.1% of those over 64.

== Education ==
The Town of Newburgh is served by the Warrick County School Corporation, the only school district in the county. There are four elementary schools, two middle schools, and Castle High School. The four elementary schools are Castle, Newburgh, Sharon, and Yankeetown. The two middle schools are Castle North and Castle South. The Indiana Board of Education awarded all of Newburgh's public schools an "A" grade, the highest possible. Additional private schools are located in surrounding communities.

Prior to 1959, Newburgh had its own high school. The school colors were navy blue and old gold, and the mascot was the Wildcats. That year, it merged into Castle High School.

Newburgh is served by two branches of the Ohio Township Public Library System. The branch was established on May 15, 1916, in downtown Newburgh as a Carnegie endowed library. The Downtown Newburgh branch underwent a renovation that was completed in 1984. The Bell Road library became the main branch in 2005. In 2017, the library joined the Evergreen Indiana consortium, which allows patrons to borrow materials from over 100 libraries across Indiana.

== Cultural features ==
Several blocks of Main Street in Newburgh have been intentionally groomed to give off a historic village "river town" air.

Each summer, Newburgh hosts a number of festivals, including a Wine, Art & Jazz Festival; Fiddler Fest; and the Strawberry Festival. Some events are held on the shore of the river near the town's lock and dam, with others in the antique downtown section of Newburgh. Summerfest (formerly called the Summer Social), held at St. John's Catholic Parish and School during the month of June.

Each fall, the historic downtown association hosts popular "Ghost Walks" where attendees learn of the town's history of mining, the Civil War, and the Underground Railroad. The first weekend in December features a downtown Christmas celebration with over 60 people dressed in period costumes, carolers, and street musicians. Trolley tours, photos with Santa, and the Newburgh tree lighting ceremony are also part of "Newburgh Celebrates Christmas."

Newburgh has several municipal parks. A bicycle and pedestrian trail extend along the riverfront, with plans to eventually link it up with Evansville's trail system and tie into the wider American Discovery Trail. In 2006, the United States Senior Men's Amateur Golf Championship was hosted in Warrick County, not far from Newburgh, at the Victoria National Golf Course.

== Transportation ==
Historically, Newburgh was served by the Evansville Suburban & Newburgh railroad Traction Line, which connected a station on Water Street to downtown Evansville via trolley. The service was replaced by bus service and closed in 1930.

Warrick Area Transit System (WATS) provides bus service linking Newburgh to the Metropolitan Evansville Transit System and the Evansville metro.

== Notable people ==
- William Bartelt, historian and author, considered the greatest living scholar on Abraham Lincoln's youth in Indiana
- Jamey Carroll, Major League Baseball player
- Ernie Haase, musician, grew up in Newburgh
- Mock Orange, band
- Michael Rosenbaum, actor Smallville
- Marcia Yockey, local television weather personality
- Lily K. Donaldson, Miss United States 2022

== Sister cities ==
Newburgh has one sister city, as designated by Sister Cities International, Inc. (SCI):

Newburgh, Lancashire, United Kingdom

== See also ==
- List of cities and towns along the Ohio River
