= Boonville Airport (Indiana) =

- IATA: none; ICAO: none; FAA LID: I91

Summary
- Airport type: Public
- Owner: City of Boonville
- Serves: Boonville, Indiana
- Elevation AMSL: 380 ft (120 m)
- Coordinates: 38°02′33″N 087°19′04″W
- Interactive map of Boonville Airport

Runways
Direction	Length		Surface
Direction	ft	m	Surface
9/27	2,300	701	Turf

Statistics (2007)
- Aircraft operations: 5,688
- Based aircraft: 15
- Source: Federal Aviation Administration

Boonville Airport (FAA LID: I91) is a city-owned, public-use airport located two nautical miles (2.3 mi; 3.7 km) west of the central business district of Boonville, a city in Warrick County, Indiana, United States.

== Facilities and aircraft ==
Boonville Airport covers an area of 110 acres (45 ha) at an elevation of 380 feet (120 m) above mean sea level. It has one runway designated 9/27 with a turf surface measuring 2,300 by 100 feet (701 by 30 m).

For the 12-month period ending December 31, 2007, the airport had 5,688 general aviation aircraft operations, an average of 15 per day. At that time there were 15 single-engine aircraft based at this airport.

== See also ==
- List of airports in Indiana
