= Boonville Public Square Historic District =

Historic district in Indiana, United States

- U.S. National Register of Historic Places
- U.S. Historic district
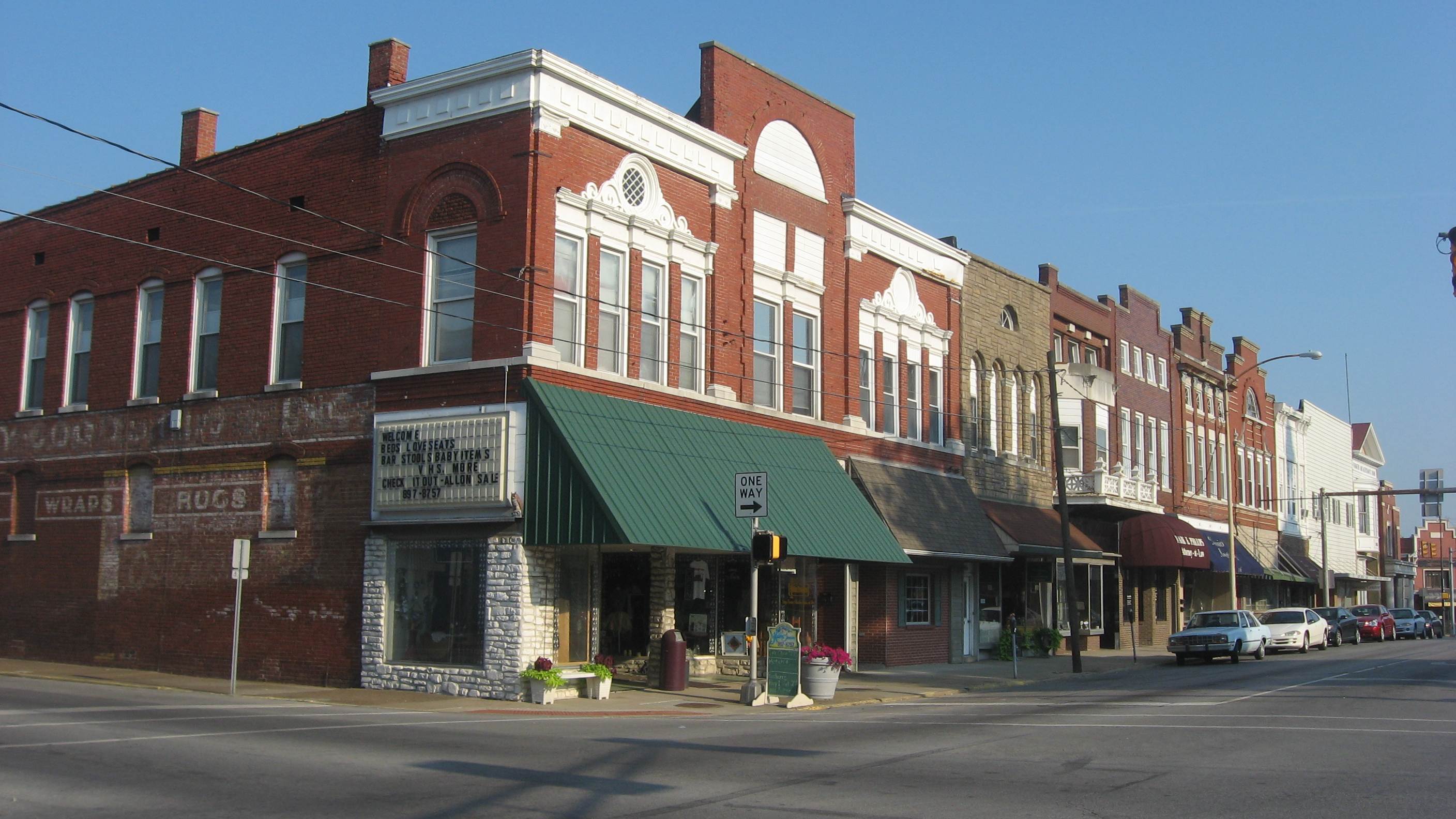
- Third Street at Courthouse Square, July 2012

- Location within Indiana Location within the United States
- Location: Bounded roughly by First, Sycamore, Fourth, and Walnut, Boonville, Indiana
- Coordinates: 38°02′57″N 87°16′29″W
- Area: 15 acres (6.1 ha)
- Built: 1904
- Architect: Harris & Shopbell; Et al.
- Architectural style: Late 19th And 20th Century Revivals
- NRHP reference No.: 86002720
- Added to NRHP: January 23, 1987

Boonville Public Square Historic District is a national historic district located at Boonville, Indiana. It encompasses 50 contributing buildings in the central business district of Boonville. It developed between about 1855 and 1934, and includes representative examples of Italianate, Beaux-Arts, Queen Anne, Tudor Revival, and Art Deco style architecture. Located in the district is the separately listed Old Warrick County Jail. Other notable buildings include the Warrick County Courthouse (1904), Boonville Standard (Mellen) Building (1902), I.O.O.F. Building (1896), Peoples' Bank (1939), Carnegie Library (1918), Trimble Block (1903), and Farmers & Merchants Bank (1902).

It was listed on the National Register of Historic Places in 1987.
