= Warrick Area Transit System =

Provider of mass transportation in Warrick County, Indiana

- Parent: Ride Solution
- Founded: August 2010
- Locale: Boonville, Chandler, and Newburgh, Indiana
- Service area: Warrick County, Indiana
- Service type: Bus service
- Routes: 3
- Fleet: 4 buses
- Annual ridership: 21,058 (2019)
- Website: WATS

Warrick Area Transit System (WATS) is the primary provider of mass transportation in Warrick County, Indiana with three routes serving Boonville, Chandler, and Newburgh. It is a service of Ride Solution, which also provides demand-response transit throughout southwestern Indiana. As of 2019, the system provided 21,058 rides over 12,311 annual vehicle revenue hours with 4 buses.

== History ==
WATS began service in August 2010 to provide affordable bus service in the county. Ride Solution had provided demand-response service to the elderly and people with disabilities since 2000, but there was a need for improved transit to serve the general public. Service began August 9 to Newburgh, with the routes to Chandler and Boonville added later.

== Service ==
WATS operates three weekday bus routes connecting Metropolitan Evansville Transit System riders to destinations in Warrick County. Buses operate deviated fixed-routes to Boonville, Chandler, and Newburgh. Hours of operation for the system are Monday through Friday from 5:45 A.M. to 6:00 P.M. There is no service on Saturdays and Sundays. Regular fares are $1.00.

=== Routes ===
- Chandler/Newburgh East Route
- Newburgh West Route
- Boonville Route

== Fixed route ridership ==
The ridership statistics shown here are of WATS fixed route services only and do not include demand response services provided by Ride Solution.

== See also ==
- List of bus transit systems in the United States
- Metropolitan Evansville Transit System
