= Original Newburgh Historic District =

Historic district in Indiana, United States

- U.S. National Register of Historic Places
- U.S. Historic district
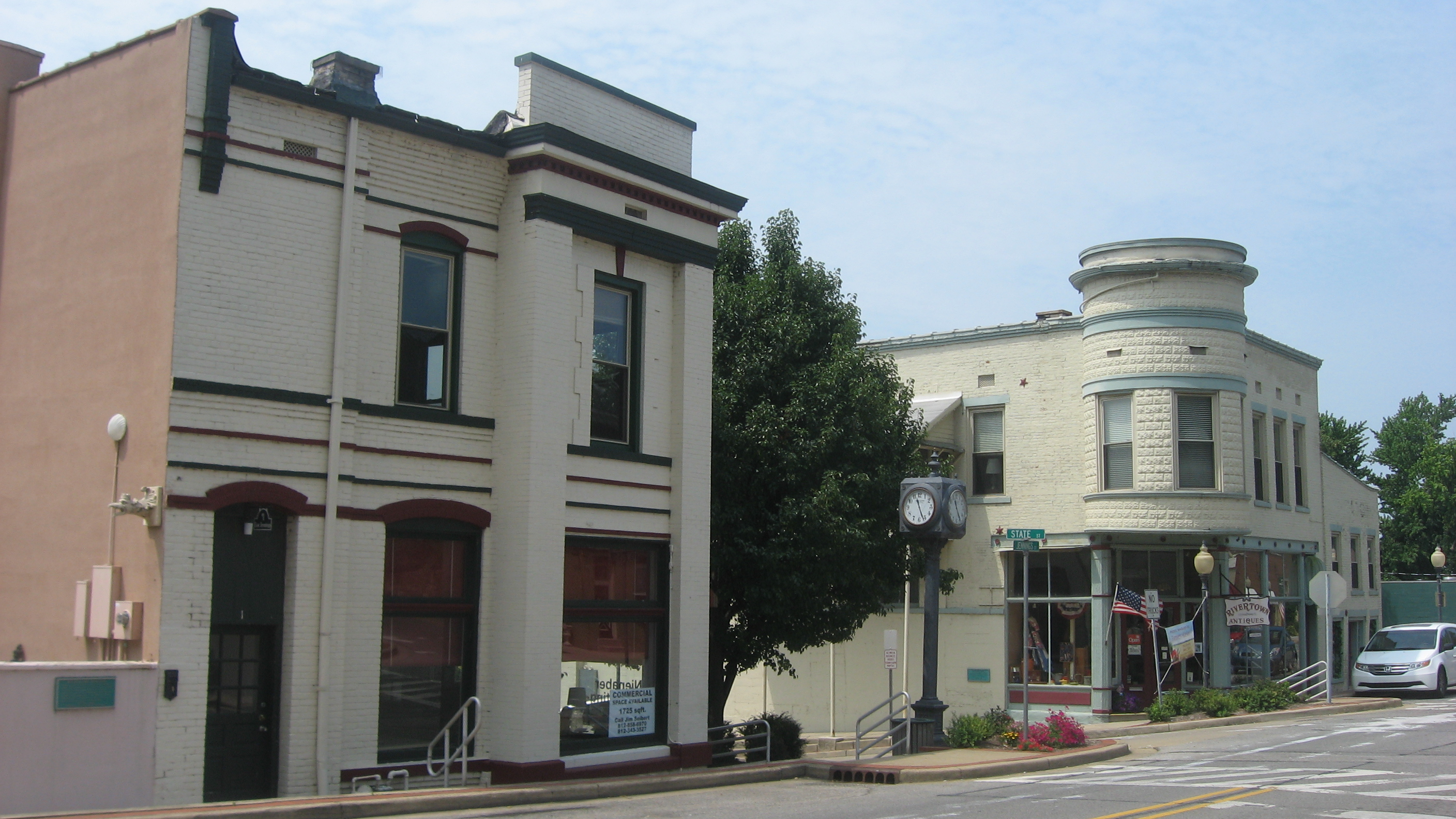
- State and Jennings in Newburgh, July 2011

- Location within Indiana Location within the United States
- Location: Roughly bounded by IN 662, Water, Monroe, Main and Middle Sts., Newburgh, Indiana
- Coordinates: 37°56′40″N 87°24′19″W
- Area: 8.8 acres (3.6 ha)
- Built: 1850
- Architect: Multiple
- Architectural style: Greek Revival, Italianate, Classical Revival
- NRHP reference No.: 83000162
- Added to NRHP: June 16, 1983

Original Newburgh Historic District is a national historic district located at Newburgh, Indiana. It encompasses 27 contributing buildings in the central business district of Newburgh. It developed between about 1850 and 1930, and includes representative examples of Italianate, Greek Revival, and Classical Revival style architecture. Located in the district is the separately listed Old Warrick County Jail. Other notable buildings include the Evansville, Suburban, and Newburgh Railway Depot (1912); I.O.O.F. Building; Carnegie Library (1919); and Newburgh Bank (1902, 1918).

It was listed on the National Register of Historic Places in 1983.
