= Boonville, Indiana =

- City
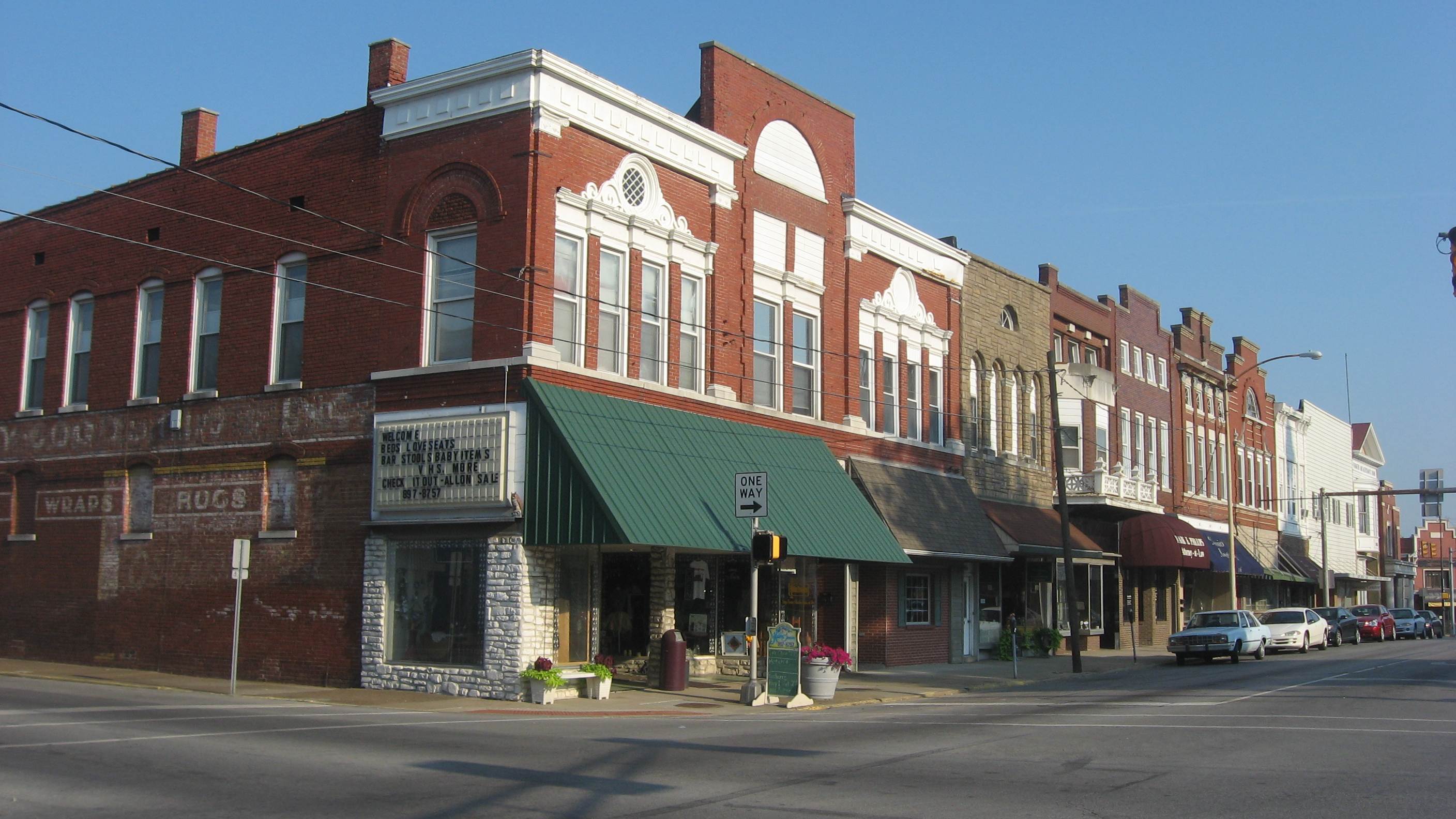
- The downtown historic district in Boonville is listed on the National Register of Historic Places

- Seal

- Location of Boonville in Warrick County, Indiana.
- Coordinates: 38°02′44″N 87°17′27″W
- Country: United States
- State: Indiana
- County: Warrick
- Township: Boon
- Founded: 1818
- Incorporated (town): 1858
- Incorporated (city): 1906
- Named for: Jesse Boon

Government
  - Mayor: Charlie Wyatt (D)

Area
  - Total: 5.77 sq mi (14.94 km^{2})
  - Land: 5.73 sq mi (14.84 km^{2})
  - Water: 0.035 sq mi (0.09 km^{2})
- Elevation: 390 ft (120 m)

Population (2020)
  - Total: 6,712
  - Density: 1,171.2/sq mi (452.22/km^{2})
- Time zone: UTC-6 (CST)
  - Summer (DST): UTC-5 (CDT)
- ZIP code: 47601
- Area code: 812
- FIPS code: 18-06616
- GNIS ID: 2394221
- Website: cityofboonvilleindiana.com

Boonville is a city in Boon Township, Warrick County, Indiana, United States. The population was 6,712 at the 2020 census. The city is the largest community in and the county seat of Warrick County.

== History ==
Boonville was founded in 1818 and named for Jesse Boon, father of Ratliff Boon. A post office has been in operation at Boonville since 1820. Boonville was incorporated in 1858 as a town and once again in 1906 as a city.

President Abraham Lincoln studied law in Boonville. When Abraham Lincoln and his family moved from Kentucky to present-day Spencer County in 1816, their homestead was then considered to be within Boonville's Warrick County boundaries. The future president frequently walked to Boonville to borrow books and watch local attorney John Brackenridge argue cases, thus earning Boonville the distinction of being "where Lincoln learned the law."

== Points of interest ==
The Boonville post office contains a casein tempera-on-canvas mural titled Boonville Beginnings, painted in 1941 by Ida Abelman. Murals were produced from 1934 to 1943 in the United States through the Section of Painting and Sculpture, later called the Section of Fine Arts, of the Treasury Department.

The Boonville Public Square Historic District and Old Warrick County Jail are listed on the National Register of Historic Places.

== Geography ==
Boonville is located at 38°2′46″N 87°16′21″W (38.046231, -87.272544).

According to the 2010 census, Boonville has a total area of 3.013 square miles (7.80 km^{2}), of which 3 square miles (7.77 km^{2}) (or 99.57%) is land and 0.013 square miles (0.03 km^{2}) (or 0.43%) is water.

=== Climate ===
The climate in this area is characterized by hot, humid summers and generally mild to cool winters. According to the Köppen Climate Classification system, Boonville has a humid subtropical climate, abbreviated "Cfa" on climate maps.

Climate data for Boonville, Indiana (1991–2020 normals, extremes 1897–1901, 1990–present)
Month	Jan	Feb	Mar	Apr	May	Jun	Jul	Aug	Sep	Oct	Nov	Dec	Year
Record high °F (°C)	70 (21)	79 (26)	84 (29)	90 (32)	96 (36)	105 (41)	107 (42)	102 (39)	101 (38)	94 (34)	84 (29)	74 (23)	107 (42)
Mean maximum °F (°C)	63.4 (17.4)	69.3 (20.7)	77.1 (25.1)	84.3 (29.1)	89.9 (32.2)	94.6 (34.8)	95.8 (35.4)	95.0 (35.0)	92.1 (33.4)	85.4 (29.7)	74.6 (23.7)	65.7 (18.7)	97.1 (36.2)
Mean daily maximum °F (°C)	42.1 (5.6)	47.4 (8.6)	57.7 (14.3)	69.9 (21.1)	78.5 (25.8)	86.3 (30.2)	88.6 (31.4)	87.5 (30.8)	81.7 (27.6)	70.3 (21.3)	56.7 (13.7)	45.8 (7.7)	67.7 (19.8)
Daily mean °F (°C)	33.8 (1.0)	38.0 (3.3)	47.0 (8.3)	58.0 (14.4)	67.3 (19.6)	75.4 (24.1)	78.3 (25.7)	76.7 (24.8)	70.0 (21.1)	58.6 (14.8)	46.6 (8.1)	37.5 (3.1)	57.3 (14.1)
Mean daily minimum °F (°C)	25.4 (−3.7)	28.6 (−1.9)	36.4 (2.4)	46.1 (7.8)	56.2 (13.4)	64.5 (18.1)	67.9 (19.9)	65.8 (18.8)	58.3 (14.6)	47.0 (8.3)	36.5 (2.5)	29.2 (−1.6)	46.8 (8.2)
Mean minimum °F (°C)	3.2 (−16.0)	8.4 (−13.1)	17.2 (−8.2)	28.3 (−2.1)	39.1 (3.9)	50.4 (10.2)	57.4 (14.1)	54.9 (12.7)	42.3 (5.7)	29.5 (−1.4)	19.7 (−6.8)	9.4 (−12.6)	−0.5 (−18.1)
Record low °F (°C)	−24 (−31)	−25 (−32)	−1 (−18)	22 (−6)	32 (0)	42 (6)	49 (9)	48 (9)	28 (−2)	24 (−4)	8 (−13)	−11 (−24)	−25 (−32)
Average precipitation inches (mm)	3.52 (89)	3.59 (91)	4.93 (125)	5.52 (140)	5.14 (131)	4.56 (116)	4.69 (119)	3.22 (82)	3.80 (97)	3.75 (95)	4.22 (107)	4.23 (107)	51.17 (1,300)
Average snowfall inches (cm)	3.4 (8.6)	3.2 (8.1)	1.6 (4.1)	0.0 (0.0)	0.0 (0.0)	0.0 (0.0)	0.0 (0.0)	0.0 (0.0)	0.0 (0.0)	0.1 (0.25)	0.3 (0.76)	2.7 (6.9)	11.3 (29)
Average precipitation days (≥ 0.01 in)	9.3	9.1	10.8	11.0	11.7	9.2	9.2	7.4	7.1	7.9	9.1	10.4	112.2
Average snowy days (≥ 0.1 in)	2.1	2.2	0.8	0.0	0.0	0.0	0.0	0.0	0.0	0.0	0.2	1.5	6.8
Source: NOAA

== Demographics ==
Historical population
Census	Pop.	Note	%±
1850	196		—
1860	621		216.8%
1870	1,039		67.3%
1880	1,182		13.8%
1890	1,881		59.1%
1900	2,849		51.5%
1910	3,934		38.1%
1920	4,451		13.1%
1930	4,208		−5.5%
1940	4,526		7.6%
1950	5,092		12.5%
1960	4,801		−5.7%
1970	5,736		19.5%
1980	6,300		9.8%
1990	6,724		6.7%
2000	6,834		1.6%
2010	6,246		−8.6%
2020	6,712		7.5%
U.S. Decennial Census

=== 2020 census ===
As of the 2020 census, Boonville had a population of 6,712. The median age was 41.1 years. 23.2% of residents were under the age of 18 and 20.8% of residents were 65 years of age or older. For every 100 females there were 91.6 males, and for every 100 females age 18 and over there were 87.8 males age 18 and over.

90.0% of residents lived in urban areas, while 10.0% lived in rural areas.

There were 2,715 households in Boonville, of which 29.4% had children under the age of 18 living in them. Of all households, 45.7% were married-couple households, 16.5% were households with a male householder and no spouse or partner present, and 29.5% were households with a female householder and no spouse or partner present. About 31.1% of all households were made up of individuals and 15.0% had someone living alone who was 65 years of age or older.

There were 2,986 housing units, of which 9.1% were vacant. The homeowner vacancy rate was 2.6% and the rental vacancy rate was 6.9%.

Racial composition as of the 2020 census
Race	Number	Percent
White	6,292	93.7%
Black or African American	57	0.8%
American Indian and Alaska Native	15	0.2%
Asian	18	0.3%
Native Hawaiian and Other Pacific Islander	1	0.0%
Some other race	38	0.6%
Two or more races	291	4.3%
Hispanic or Latino (of any race)	116	1.7%

=== 2010 census ===
As of the 2010 census, there were 6,246 people, 2,549 households, and 1,647 families living in the city. The population density was 2,082.0 inhabitants per square mile (803.9/km^{2}). There were 2,867 housing units at an average density of 955.7 per square mile (369.0/km^{2}). The racial makeup of the city was 97.7% White, 0.5% African American, 0.2% Native American, 0.1% Asian, 0.4% from other races, and 1.1% from two or more races. Hispanic or Latino of any race were 1.2% of the population.

There were 2,549 households, of which 31.3% had children under the age of 18 living with them, 47.0% were married couples living together, 13.5% had a female householder with no husband present, 4.1% had a male householder with no wife present, and 35.4% were non-families. 31.1% of all households were made up of individuals, and 15.1% had someone living alone who was 65 years of age or older. The average household size was 2.39 and the average family size was 2.97.

The median age in the city was 39.4 years. 23.3% of residents were under the age of 18; 7.4% were between the ages of 18 and 24; 25.8% were from 25 to 44; 25.4% were from 45 to 64; and 18% were 65 years of age or older. The gender makeup of the city was 46.3% male and 53.7% female.

=== 2000 census ===
As of the 2000 census, there were 6,834 people, 2,688 households, and 1,854 families living in the city. The population density was 2,318.9 inhabitants per square mile (895.3/km^{2}). There were 2,910 housing units at an average density of 987.4 per square mile (381.2/km^{2}). The racial makeup of the city was 98.51% White, 0.64% African American, 0.20% Native American, 0.12% Asian, 0.01% Pacific Islander, 0.03% from other races, and 0.48% from two or more races. Hispanic or Latino of any race were 0.44% of the population.

There were 2,688 households, out of which 32.1% had children under the age of 18 living with them, 52.2% were married couples living together, 12.4% had a female householder with no husband present, and 31.0% were non-families. 27.8% of all households were made up of individuals, and 14.7% had someone living alone who was 65 years of age or older. The average household size was 2.45 and the average family size was 2.98.

In the city, the population was spread out, with 25.2% under the age of 18, 9.3% from 18 to 24, 28.2% from 25 to 44, 21.4% from 45 to 64, and 15.9% who were 65 years of age or older. The median age was 37 years. For every 100 females, there were 90.7 males. For every 100 females age 18 and over, there were 84.9 males.

The median income for a household in the city was $34,913, and the median income for a family was $42,096. Males had a median income of $32,264 versus $22,227 for females. The per capita income for the city was $15,869. About 6.5% of families and 9.2% of the population were below the poverty line, including 14.1% of those under age 18 and 7.3% of those age 65 or over.

== Government ==
The government consists of a mayor and a city council. The mayor is elected in citywide vote. The city council consists of five members. Four are elected from individual districts. One is elected at-large.

== Transportation ==
The Boonville Airport is located two nautical miles (2.3 mi, 3.7 km) west of the central business district. Boonville also has the Warrick Area Transit System (WATS), a public bus line which connects with the nearby Metropolitan Evansville Transit System (METS).

== Education ==
The town has a lending library, the Boonville-Warrick County Public Library. Additionally, within city limits there are two elementary schools: Oakdale Elementary and Loge Elementary. Boonville Middle School and Boonville High School also serve the residents.

== Notable people ==
- Louis A. Arnold – HVAC worker and Socialist Party of America Wisconsin State Senator
- Benoni S. Fuller – schoolteacher, sheriff, and Democratic state legislator and Congressman
- Barbara Maier Gustern - singer and vocal coach
- James A. Hemenway - lawyer, US Representative, US Senator
- Monte M. Katterjohn – screenwriter for 68 films between 1912 and 1931
- Menz Lindsey – lawyer who was also a quarterback in the early National Football League for the Evansville Crimson Giants
- Philip Lutz, Jr. – 27th Indiana Attorney General (1933–37)
- W. Otto Miessner – composer and music educator
- Ken Penner – baseball pitcher who played Major League Baseball for two seasons (1916 and 1929) between decades of a minor league career that lasted through 1943
- Dustin Ransom – musician, producer, vocalist, arranger, music transcriber, and film composer
- Rachel Rockwell – theatre director, choreographer, dancer and actor
- Robert G. Roeder - Professor at The Rockefeller University, pioneer scientist in eukaryotic transcription
- Jeremy Spencer – musician, songwriter and record producer, co-founder and drummer for heavy metal band Five Finger Death Punch
- Travis Williams – tailback in the National Football League's Evansville Crimson Giants
- John Riley Tanner (1844–1901), served as the 21st Governor of Illinois from 1897 to 1901. He was born in Warrick County near Boonville.
- Ratliff Boon (1781–1844), served as the 2nd Governor of Indiana and six terms in the US House of Representatives.
