= Marcia Yockey =

American meteorologist

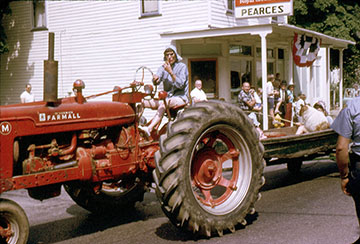
- driving a float in a parade in mid-1966 in Newburgh, Indiana.
- Born: November 6, 1922; Muncie, Indiana
- Died: September 28, 2000
- Education: Evansville College, 3 years of pre-medical training; meteorology training in Chicago by US Weather Bureau during World War II
- Occupation: Meteorologist

Marcia Yockey (6 November 1922 - 28 September 2000) was an American meteorologist who was best known for her 35-year on-air career in Evansville, Indiana. She made her television debut on WFIE Channel 14 in 1953, after 10 years of working for the U.S. Weather Bureau (1943–1953).

== Life ==
She was initially trained in Chicago at the US Weather Bureau school during World War II. Her recruitment into the U.S. Weather Bureau was a consequence of the depletion of male professionals due to war recruitment.

After a 10-year U.S. Weather Bureau career at Evansville Indiana and Grand Island, Nebraska, Yockey's love of the Evansville area and the need to be close to family led to her beginning her television weather forecasting career on November 15, 1953, at the new WFIE-TV station. At this time, TV stations did not require a formal meteorology degree. Over the course of her career, she moved from WFIE Channel 14 to WTVW Channel 7 in 1956, then returned to Channel 14 in 1971, before finally retiring in 1988. Notorious for her sometimes eccentric behavior, Yockey quit one station because she didn't like a new theme song they picked. Another time she gave notice when her bosses cancelled her annual July 4 televised swim after the forecast.

Yockey was also a skilled pilot. She owned a single-engine plane (a two-seat Taylorcraft she named the "Butterfly") and noted that flying was among her favorite pastimes.

Channel 14 newscaster Mike Blake recalled the veteran weather-woman's habit of going beyond her allotted time. Blake, becoming impatient from the sidelines asked for Yockey to hurry it up. Yockey, in full view and hearing of the television audience, responded with "Keep it up, Sports, and you'll never get on."

Yockey was apparently unconcerned with ratings, and her longevity in working in Evansville was unique among television personalities, despite having been invited to join teams in New York and Los Angeles, among others. One driver behind her remaining in the Evansville local area is that her elderly parents still lived in the area. Her routine involved two hours of preparation for her typically five-minute weather presentation.

A resident of Newburgh, she reached star status for her forecasting skill, irreverent attitude, and colorful personality, bordering on performance art. She died in 2000 at the age of 77 after suffering for several years from Alzheimer's disease, though ultimately succumbing to a heart attack. It appears that she never married.
