= Old Newburgh Presbyterian Church =

Historic church in Indiana, United States

- U.S. National Register of Historic Places
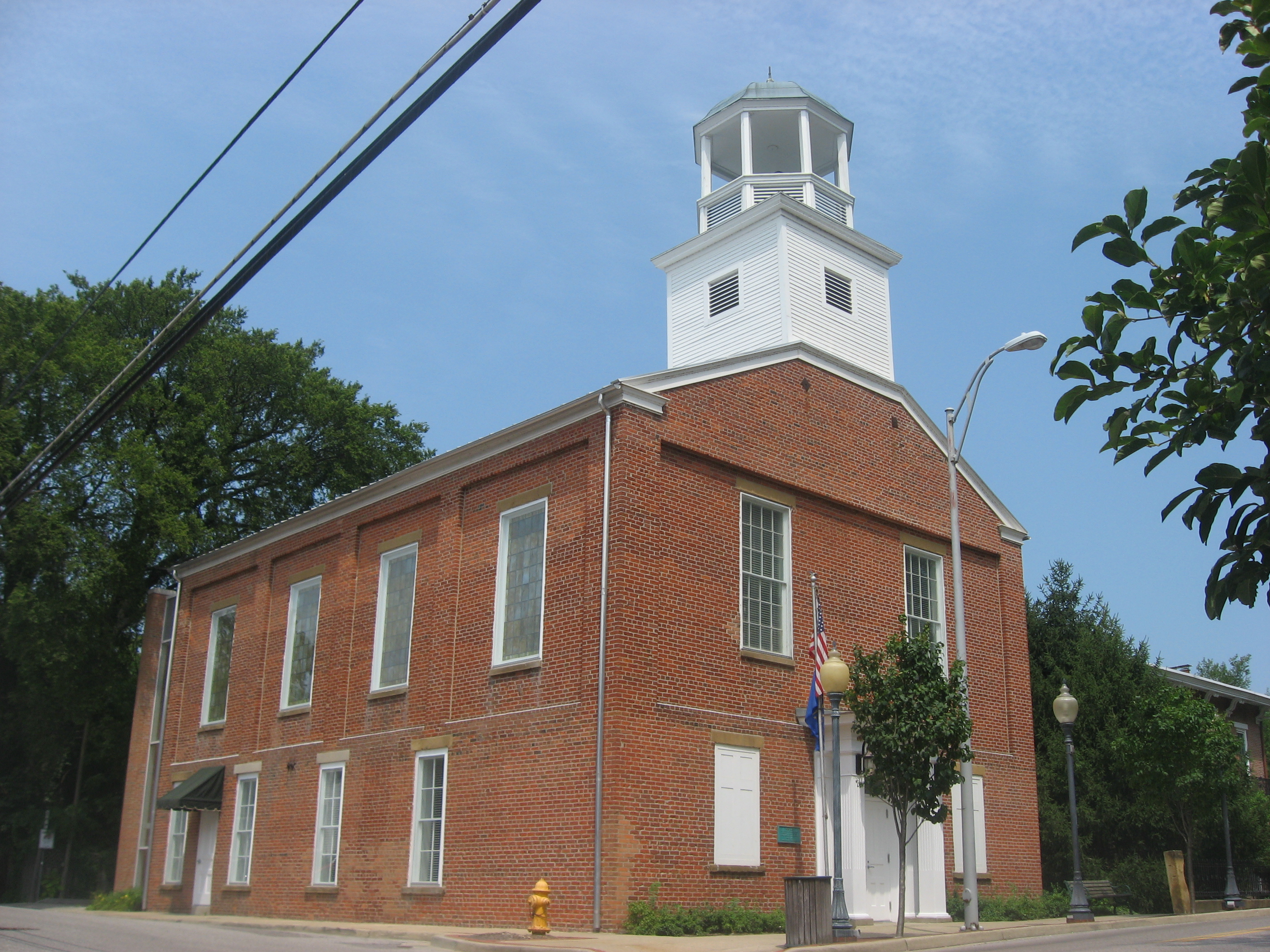
- Front and side of the church

- Location within Indiana Location within the United States
- Location: N. State and W. Main Sts., Newburgh, Indiana
- Coordinates: 37°56′44″N 87°24′19″W
- Area: less than one acre
- Built: 1851
- NRHP reference No.: 78000040
- Added to NRHP: May 23, 1978

Old Newburgh Presbyterian Church (also known as Newburgh Town Hall or Preservation Hall) is a historic church at N. State and W. Main Streets in Newburgh, Indiana, United States.

Following the 1811–12 New Madrid earthquakes, a desire sprung up in the town for new houses of worship. In 1841, a new church was built at 10 W Jennings Street with the generosity of a Mr. Phelps, a prominent businessman whose wife Frances was a member of the first Presbyterian in Newburgh. This house of worship became Cumberland Presbyterian Church, and was later the location of the Delaney School.

Construction of a new building, which would later be known as the Old Newburgh Presbyterian Church, began in 1851 at a cost of $4,000. The land donated by Mr. Phelpsand was dedicated June 25, 1853.

During the Civil War the church bell tower was used to signal to call the Home Guard when danger threatened. The rope ran from the belfry to a house next door.

In 1880 the Newburgh High School held graduation services there for four graduates. In 1906 the congregation voted to withdraw from the Cumberland denomination. The new name was given as Newburgh Presbyterian Church.

The building was remodeled in 1927 and again in 1938, when the cornerstone was removed. In the 1937 flood, the building was headquarters for the National Guard. In 1965 the building was sold for $14,000 to the town of Newburgh and referred to as TOWN HALL. Several remodeling projects were completed from 1968 to 1973. It was placed in the National Register of Historic Places 1978.
