= Evansville Crimson Giants =

Defunct American football team

General information
- Founded: 1921
- Folded: 1922
- Stadium: Bosse Field
- Headquartered: Evansville, Indiana, United States
- Colors: Crimson, white

Personnel
- Owner: Frank Fausch
- Head coach: Frank Fausch

Team history
- Evansville Crimson Giants (1921–1922)

League / conference affiliations
- National Football League (1921–1922)

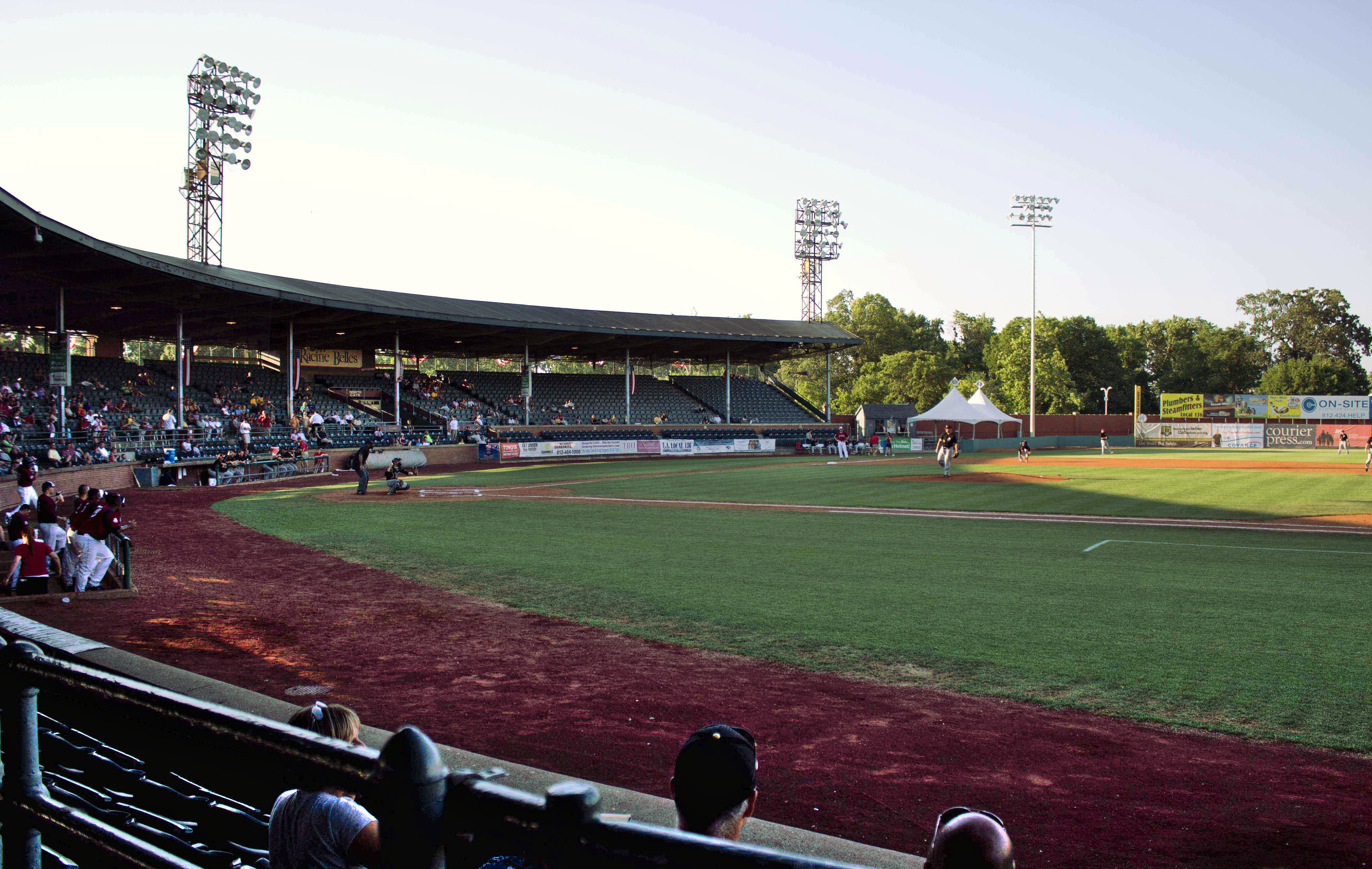
Bosse Field, Evansville, Indiana

The Evansville Crimson Giants were a professional American football team based in Evansville, Indiana and were a part of the National Football League in 1921 and 1922. The Giants home games were played at Bosse Field. According to the Evansville Courier and Press in 1921, 'they surprised local fans in developing a winning team' and 'the Giants' one-sided victories over inferior non-league teams has had good fan reaction.' However, the team did not succeed, mostly due to scheduling mistakes and management problems. Evansville's local sporting enthusiasts also failed to respond favorably and attend the home games.

== History ==
=== Ex-Collegians ===
The Crimson Giants history is rooted in Evansville's first significant semi-pro team, the Evansville Ex-Collegians, who began play in 1920. The Ex-Collegians played and followed the typical semi-professional template of the era. The team employed local players almost exclusively. They paid those players a small sum based on gate receipts and on a game-by-game basis. The team also operated without any real management oversight, meaning that the players looked after the team's finances, and scheduled games haphazardly. In 1920, a group of local businessmen tried to purchase the Ex-Collegians. However, the investors and the players failed to reach a compromise.

After the initial two victories over modest opponents, the Ex-Collegians bragged of possibly playing the most celebrated pro football team in the nation, the Canton Bulldogs, on Christmas Day, 1920. While the chances of the game taking place between Evansville and Canton were slim, the rumor of a Canton game was actually a marketing scheme to draw attention to the newly established Ex-Collegians. The team finished their 1920 season with a 7–1 record.

=== Formation of the Crimson Giants ===
In 1921, the same unnamed businessmen who failed to take over the Ex-Collegians in 1920 decided to form their own team. Frank Fausch, a Fullback for the Ex-Collegians, and Mark Ingle, an offensive lineman with the team, left the Ex-Collegians to create a new corporation, known as the "American Football Association", which owned a new professional team soon nicknamed the Crimson Giants. Fausch served as the team's president and general manager, while Ingle served as vice-president. The two men put together an ownership group that included Evansville's leading businessmen and professionals. Evansville's mayor, Benjamin Bosse, and the vice-president of City National Bank were included in this group. The city's Chamber of Commerce was also heavily involved in promoting the Crimson Giants.

=== Merger of the Ex-Collegians and Crimson Giants ===
The remaining Ex-Collegians, led by their quarterback and captain, Menz Lindsey, at first refused to join Fausch and Ingle. The Ex-Collegians wanted instead to continue playing independently. However Fausch needed many of those Ex-Collegian players in order to create his new team. He came to an agreement with Guy Morrison, a popular baseball pitcher with the Evansville Evas of the Illinois–Indiana–Iowa League. With Morrison, Fausch arranged for a benefit game that provided funds for the construction of a World War I veterans' memorial. By doing this, the Crimson Giants secured the exclusive use of the only suitable stadium in Evansville, Bosse Field. Lindsey tried to challenge the Giants to a contest in the benefit game; however, Fausch refused to respond.

Many professional football players soon flooded to the Crimson Giants. Bourbon Bondurant, an insurance agent with prior pro football experience with the Fort Wayne Friars; Joe Windbiel, a local high school coach who played professionally with the Detroit Heralds; architect Earl Warweg, who had played semi-pro football for five years in Indianapolis; cigar company traffic manager Clarence Specht; and June Talley, an insurance adjuster also with college football experience, soon joined the team.

After finding no other venue in which to play in Evansville, many of the Ex-Collegians joined the Crimson Giants. Soon, Doc Gorman joined the Crimson Giants, becoming the first Ex-Collegian, other than Fausch and Ingle, to defect. Within a week, Lindsey and Clarence Spiegel, two main pillars of the Ex-Collegians' organization, jumped to the Crimson Giants.

=== The NFL ===
On August 27, 1921, Fausch traveled to Chicago to secure an American Professional Football Association (renamed the National Football League in 1922) franchise for Evansville. It was then that Evansville was awarded an APFA franchise that was scheduled to begin play in 1921.

==== 1921 season ====
The Crimson Giants won five of their first seven games. The team's first-ever league win came at home on October 2, 1921, as the Crimson Giants defeated the Louisville Brecks, 21–0. The team's second league win can a week later against the Muncie Flyers, 14–0. However, the Crimson Giants lost to the Hammond Pros, 3–0, the very next week. That win was Hammond's first win in the league. During that game, Herb Henderson later stated that the Hammond players met with him during the game and asked if he could tone down his hits because the Hammond players still needed to be healthy for work on Monday. Henderson, a high school football coach, refused and stated that he needed to show his players, who were sitting in the stands watching him, "how tackling was done."

However, the team lost a lot of money when it suffered through a series of scheduling mishaps in the second half of November. As a result of the eleven games originally scheduled, only five were actually played. Furthermore, only half of the ten games ultimately played by the Giants were against league opponents. In early November, the Crimson Giants travelled to Green Bay, Wisconsin, to face the APFA's Green Bay Packers at Hagemeister Park. Although Fausch intended to play every game in Evansville, he chose at this point to receive a guaranteed sum from the Packers' organization rather than risk losing more money at Bosse Field, where attendance had been disappointing. With several players unable to leave Evansville for the weekend, Fausch found replacements, but the revamped Crimson Giants were defeated in Green Bay, 43–6.

Fausch then scheduled a pair of non-league opponents. The first game, which was to take place in Chicago, was cancelled due to heavy snow, while the other game was cancelled by the opposing team. Fausch quickly added a game against the Cincinnati Celts. However, when faced with poor field conditions and two days of heavy rain, Fausch made a last-minute cancellation. Rather than play before another small crowd and lose more money, he decided not to play at all.

The Crimson Giants had now cancelled their last three games, one of which was to be played on Thanksgiving Day, the biggest football day of the year. As a result, the players received no money, and Fausch had to pay rent for an unused Bosse Field.

Fausch made sure the next game would be played. The Cincinnati Celts were rescheduled and Fausch informed the press that the game would be played "rain or shine." He then stated that three more games, two against APFA opponents, would be played in Evansville. The Celts game was played on Bosse Field, which was damaged due to heavy rains. The Crimson Giants won their sixth game of the season, 48–0; however, the team still took a financial loss due to poor attendance. A scoreless tie against a non-APFA opponent, two weeks later, ended the 1921 season for the Crimson Giants.

=== Committee of Five ===
Many of the Crimson Giants' players became upset with management of the team under Fausch after the 1921 season. It was then that several members of the team took matters into their own hands. The "Committee of Five", led by former Ex-Collegians Menz Lindsey and Clarence Spiegel, forced Fausch to surrender management of the team. The "Committee of Five" could not reverse the Crimson Giants' financial fortunes. The Committee lost money in its only contests. Fausch and his American Football Association corporation lost an estimated $10,000 over the course of the season, despite playing a total of nine games at home and only one on the road. To combat the "Committee of Five", Fausch asserted publicly that it was he who held the franchise rights in the American Professional Football Association, and thus owned the Crimson Giants. To help improve the team's finances, he suggested that he would play every Crimson Giants game on the road.

However Fausch lost his players. Several former Giants announced they would play for the local Knights of Columbus squad instead. Menz Lindsey then re-formed the Ex-Collegians and named Herb Henderson the team's coach. Lindsey's club then secured the financial backing of the Evansville Baseball Fans' Association. Johnny Nee, manager of the Evanston Evas, became the team's business manager. The team was dubbed the Fans' Association team.

Fausch attended the APFA's meeting in Columbus, Ohio, and posted a $1,000 bond to secure his claim to the franchise. It was at this meeting that Chicago Bears owner George Halas suggested that the APFA be renamed the NFL. The Crimson Giants' membership in the NFL meant that the Fans' Association team could not play league teams. Thus, they would be forced to play teams that were considered second-rate opponents. However, the Fans' Association team had secured an exclusive lease to Bosse Field for the entire football season, leaving the Crimson Giants with no park for the 1922 season. The Fans' Association team also signed many key players from the 1921 Crimson Giants team. Around this time, Johnny Nee renamed the Fans' Association team the Evansville Pros and attempted to schedule games against the Hammond Pros, Dayton Triangles, and the Louisville Brecks. However, a letter from NFL president Joseph Carr stated that Nee's Evansville Pros were not members of the NFL and NFL league clubs would only be allowed to play Fausch's Crimson Giants.

==== 1922 season ====
The Crimson Giants played their first three games of the season on the road. Fausch, in the meantime, had hoped that the Evansville Pros would fold in October, so that he could regain the rights to Bosse Field. The Pros folded after witnessing poor attendance and an 0–1–1 record. As a result, Fausch entered into negotiations with Nee over the sale of the lease for Bosse Field. However, the negotiations between the two clubs broke down and the Crimson Giants cancelled their remaining home games. The team only played three games in 1922, all on the road. The Crimson Giants lost all three of those games, to the Toledo Maroons, Rock Island Independents and Louisville Brecks.

The wins by the Brecks and Maroons became the first in Louisville and Toledo franchise history. Meanwhile, the Rock Island Independents became only the second team with two 100-yard rushers in their 60–0 win over Evansville. Jimmy Conzelman ran for five touchdowns during that game, setting an NFL record that remained in place until 1929, when Ernie Nevers scored 40 points alone against the Chicago Bears. The Independents also became the first NFL team to rush for 300 yards in that Evansville game, with 66 carries for 396 yards. The Crimson Giants had the ball for only 26 plays, and seven of those were punts.

=== End of the Crimson Giants ===
Fausch talked briefly about re-organizing a new Crimson Giants club for the 1923 season; however, he never made an effort to restart the team. Several of the Crimson Giants went on to play professional football for other NFL teams. While the Evansville Crimson Giants were the only league team to go under between the end of the 1922 season and the beginning of the 1923 season, few teams other than the Bears saw profits from football.

== Social make up of the Evansville teams ==
The Crimson Giants relied more on outside talent than did their predecessors, the Ex-Collegians. 17 of the Crimson Giants' 30 players in 1921 were from Evansville, but by 1922, only five of the team's 17 players were locals. In contrast, 22 of 23 players on the 1920 Ex-Collegians were from Evansville. When faced with competition from the Giants in 1921, the Ex-Collegians brought in a few outsiders before folding, but generally, semi-pro teams spent little effort on recruiting. Both the Ex-Collegians and the Crimson Giants relied almost exclusively on players with college experience. Both teams consisted overwhelmingly of players from middle class backgrounds. Only a few blue collar workers played professional football in Evansville in the early 1920s. Of every player whose occupation could be determined, almost all of them were white-collar workers. The 1921 Crimson Giants included three lawyers, one physician, and one dentist. It is believed that the blue collars workers were excluded from football in Evansville due to a lack of leisure time.

== Season-by-season ==
Year	W	L	T	Finish	Coach
1921	3	2	0	6th	Frank Fausch
1922	0	3	0	15th	Frank Fausch

== See also ==
- Sports in Evansville
