= Bosse Field =

Baseball stadium in Evansville, Indiana

Coordinates: 37°59′34″N 87°33′44″W

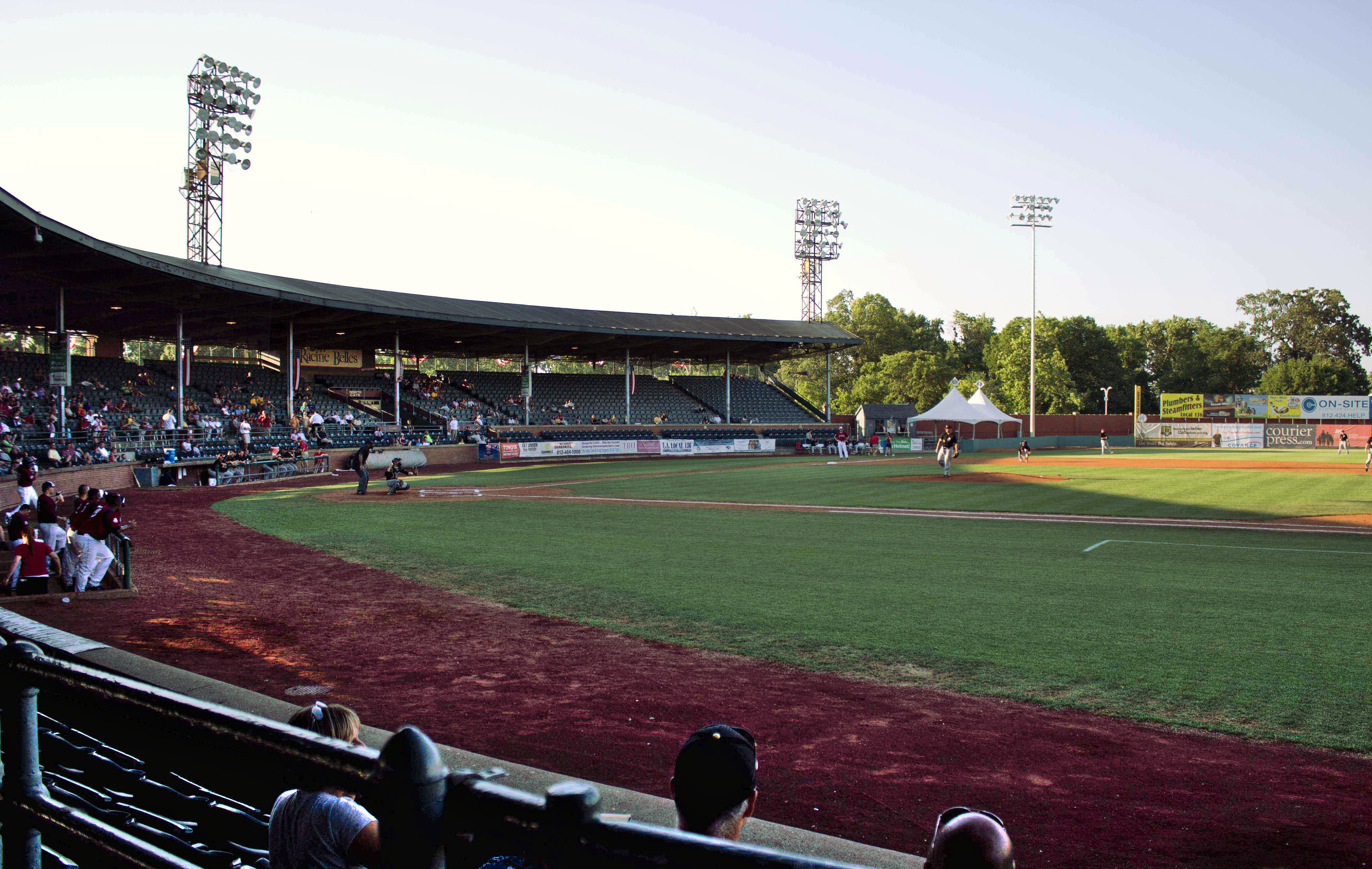
- Interactive map of Bosse Field
- Location: 23 Don Mattingly Way; Evansville, Indiana 47711
- Owner: Evansville Vanderburgh School Corporation
- Operator: Evansville Otters
- Capacity: 7,180 (1915–1958); 5,181 (1958–present)
- Surface: Bermuda Grass
- Record attendance: 8,253 (July 24, 2013)
- Field size: Left field – 315 feet (96 m); Center field – 415 feet (126 m); Right field – 315 feet (96 m)
- Public transit: METS

Construction
- Opened: June 17, 1915
- Cost: $65,000

Tenants
- Evansville Otters (NAPB) 1995–present List of previous tenants

Bosse Field is a baseball stadium located in Evansville, Indiana, seating 5,181 people. Opened in 1915, it was the first municipally owned sports stadium in the United States and is the third-oldest ballpark still in regular use for professional baseball, surpassed only by Fenway Park (1912) in Boston and Wrigley Field (1914) in Chicago.

It is the home field of the Evansville Otters of the National Association of Professional Baseball (NAPB), as well as high school and American Legion games, and in the past hosted spring training for the Detroit Tigers, college baseball, high school, college, and NFL football, college soccer, and concerts.

Seven Baseball Hall of Fame members played for Evansville teams at Bosse Field during their minor league careers, including Chuck Klein, Hank Greenberg, Warren Spahn, Bob Uecker, Bert Blyleven, Jack Morris, and Alan Trammell. The historic stadium was also used in 1991 by Columbia Pictures for filming numerous game scenes in the 1992 comedy-drama, A League of Their Own.

== History ==
Benjamin Bosse, mayor of Evansville from 1914 to 1922, reached an agreement with Thomas Garvin's family shortly after taking office in January 1914 to purchase land on the north side of the city for a park. However, the city was in a deficit and could not afford the full $50,000 price. Mayor Bosse conceived of the plan to sell part of the land to the school board who would then build a new stadium to be used for school functions as well as Evansville's baseball team, of which Bosse was a co-owner. When the president of the school board opposed the plan, Bosse had him replaced with a friend, and the new school board both approved the project and also voted to name it Bosse Field in honor of the mayor. Construction was completed the following summer, and Bosse Field opened on June 17, 1915. A Central League record crowd of 8,082 fans attended the stadium dedication and opening game, a 4–0 Evansville victory. Evansville was in third place when they moved to Bosse Field, but went on to win the league championship in 1915.

If it had not been for his wise and energetic management of the affairs of our city, Garvin's Park would not have been purchased by the city, and this stadium would not have been built. No more fitting name could therefore have been given this stadium than to call it Bosse Field.

— School board member Rev. J.U. Schneider honoring Mayor Bosse at Bosse Field's dedication in 1915

Ten baseball teams other than the Otters have played at Bosse Field. Some of the most famous are the Evansville Triplets (1970–84), Evansville Braves (1946–57), Evas/Pocketeers/Hubs (1919–1931) and the Evansville River Rats (1914–15). The River Rats had played in Evansville previously from (1903–1910) and (1901–1902). The Triplets won the American Association titles in 1972, 1975, and 1979. The River Rats won the Central League title in 1908 and 1915. The Braves won the Three-I League title in 1946, 1948, 1956, and 1957.

From 1921 to 1922, Bosse Field was used as a football stadium and was home to the Evansville Crimson Giants of the NFL.

The Otters franchise came to Evansville in 1995 and have attracted a record number of fans for the league. In 2006 the Otters won the Frontier League title.

Baseball Hall of Fame members Hank Greenberg, Chuck Klein, Edd Roush, Warren Spahn, and Sam Thompson played at Bosse Field during their careers; Hall of Fame Broadcaster, Bob Ueker spent part of the 1957 season as part of the Evansville Braves; another 95 Hall of Fame members visited Bosse Field on opposing teams. There have been over 20 Major League Baseball players from Evansville and dozens of Minor Leaguers.

Football Hall of Fame member Bob Griese played high school football and American Legion baseball at Bosse Field; Don Mattingly, Andy Benes, Rob Maurer, Jeff Schulz, Alan Benes and Jamey Carroll all played at Bosse Field during their high school and/or college careers.

== Former/current professional teams ==
Current / former professional teams who have called Bosse Field home, have won a combined 10 league titles.

Team	Sport	League	Played	Class	Affiliation	Championships
Evansville River Rats	Baseball	Central League	1915	B		Central League Title 1915
Evansville Evas	Baseball	Central League	1916–1917	B		None
Evansville Black Sox	Baseball	Three-I League	1919	B		None
Evansville Evas	Baseball	Three-I League	1920–1923	B		None
Evansville Crimson Giants	Football	National Football League	1921–1922	Major Professional		None
Evansville Little Evas	Baseball	Three-I League	1924	B		None
Evansville Pocketeers	Baseball	Three-I League	1925	B		None
Evansville Hubs	Baseball	Three-I League	1926–1931	B	Detroit Tigers, 1928–1931	None
Evansville Bees	Baseball	Three-I League	1938–1942	B	Boston Bees, 1938–1940; Boston Braves, 1940–1942	None
Evansville Braves	Baseball	Three-I League	1946–1957	B	Boston Braves, 1946–1953; Milwaukee Braves, 1953–1957	Three-I League Title 1946, 1948, 1956, 1957
Evansville White Sox	Baseball	Southern League	1966–1968	AA	Chicago White Sox	None
Evansville Triplets	Baseball	American Association	1970–1984	AAA	Minnesota Twins, 1970; Milwaukee Brewers, 1971–1973; Detroit Tigers, 1974–1984	American Association Title 1972, 1975, 1979; Junior World Series 1975
Evansville Otters	Baseball	Frontier League	1995–present	Independent		Frontier League Title 2006, 2016

== Concerts ==
- July 2, 1972: Freedom Festival and Ice Cream Social with Ike & Tina Turner Revue, Edgar Winter, Dr. John 'The Night Tripper', Cactus, Black Oak Arkansas, Spirit, Country Joe & The Fish, Howlin' Wolf, John Lee Hooker, Boones Farm and New Riders of the Purple Sage
- August 20, 1974: Allman Brothers Band, Elvin Bishop, REO Speedwagon

Events and tenants
Preceded by Falconi Field	Host of the FL All-Star Game; Bosse Field; 2006	Succeeded by Champion Window Field
