= Old Warrick County Jail =

Historic jail in Boonville, Indiana

- U.S. National Register of Historic Places
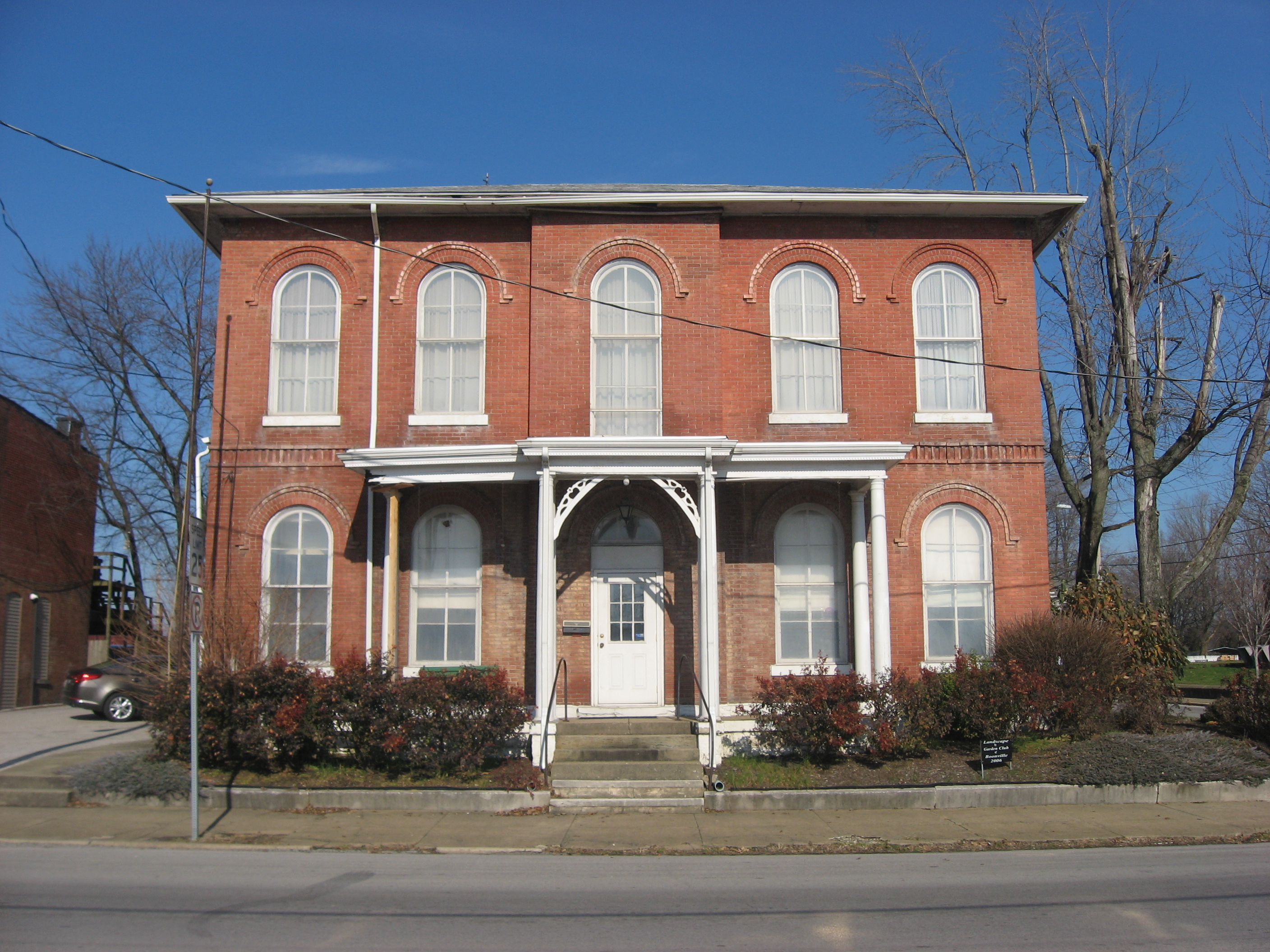
- Old Warrick County Jail, December 2011

- Location within Indiana
- Location: 124 E. Main St., Boonville, Indiana
- Coordinates: 38°3′1″N 87°16′23″W
- Area: less than one acre
- Built: 1877
- Architect: Frick, J. K.
- Architectural style: Italianate, Influence
- NRHP reference No.: 79000025
- Added to NRHP: February 14, 1979

Old Warrick County Jail is a historic jail located in Boonville, Indiana, United States. It was built in 1877, and is a two-story, Italianate style red brick building. It consists of the hipped roof former sheriff's residence at the front with the 1 1/2-story jail at the rear.

It was listed on the National Register of Historic Places in 1979.
