= Frank Fausch =

American football player, coach, and owner (1895–1968)

Profile
- Positions: Head Coach, Fullback, Guard, Halfback, Tackle

Personal information
- Born: June 13, 1895; Goshen, Indiana, United States
- Died: July 19, 1968 (Aged 73)
- Listed height: 6 ft 3 in (1.91 m)
- Listed weight: 250 lb (113 kg)

Career information
- College: Kalamazoo

Career history

Playing
- 1920: Evansville Ex-Collegians
- 1921–1922: Evansville Crimson Giants

Coaching
- 1921–1922: Evansville Crimson Giants

owner
- 1921–1922: Evansville Crimson Giants
- Coaching profile at Pro Football Reference

Franklin Leo Fausch (born June 13, 1895 – July 19, 1968) was a professional football player-coach for the Evansville Crimson Giants of the National Football League in 1921 and 1922. He was also the owner, co-founder, president and general manager of the Crimson Giants during their brief time in the NFL. Prior to establishing the Crimson Giants, Fausch played for a local semi-pro team called the Evansville Ex-Collegians.

Fausch was also the owner of a local storage battery company and had much experience in football. He had played and won honors at Michigan's Kalamazoo College, and became involved with professional football in that state before coming to Evansville. In late August 1921 Fausch traveled to Chicago to secure an American Professional Football Association franchise for Evansville. He then lured many key players away from the Ex-Collegians, when he obtained the rights to the only football stadium in Evansville, Bosse Field. However scheduling issues and game cancellations led to many of the Crimson Giants not being paid. As a result, Fausch was forced from his position as manager of the Crimson Giants.

However, since he had obtained the franchise rights for Evansville, Fausch announced himself as the sole owner of the team. In 1922, he submitted a $1,000 bond to the league, now renamed the NFL. However baseball manager, Johnny Nee had established a new semi-pro team in Evansville and obtained the rights to Bosse Field. That team however folded after just two games. Negotiations between Fausch and Nee, over the sale of the Bosse Field rights, broke down and the Crimson Giants played in just three road games in 1922, before ended their season. Fausch talked briefly about restarting a new club for the 1923 season, but ultimately made no such effort.
