= Metropolitan Evansville Transit System =

Public transit systems in Evansville, Illinois, U.S.

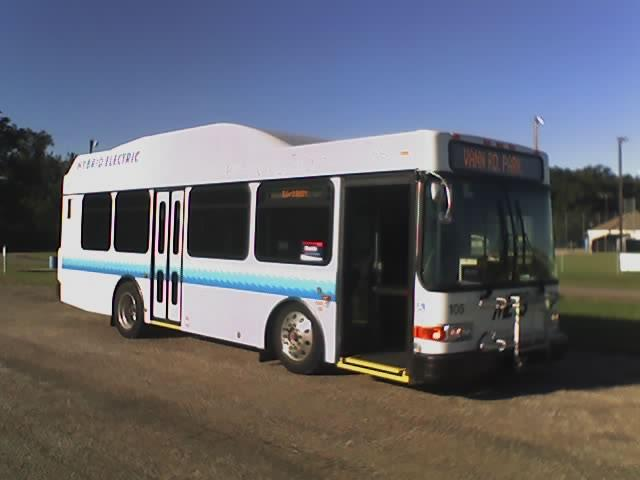
- A METS Hybrid-Electric bus
- Founded: 1971
- Headquarters: 601 John Street
- Locale: Evansville, Indiana
- Service type: bus service, paratransit, microtransit
- Routes: 22
- Stations: METS Downtown Terminal
- Fleet: 22 buses
- Annual ridership: 1,273,611 (2019)
- Website: METS

Metropolitan Evansville Transit System (METS) is a public transit system consisting primarily of bus service in the city of Evansville, Indiana.

== History ==
The Metropolitan Evansville Transit System was created in 1971 to address Evansville's growing need for public transportation. Service was limited to the actual city limits; buses ran only once an hour and generally did not run past 6:00 pm. In 1975, METS had 1,113,000 riders.

Over the years, METS has made many adjustments to its service, larger buses were purchased, new routes were added, and vintage trolley service was established in the downtown area, but it was in 1998 that major changes were made. Several routes expanded service to every 30 minutes, and METS instituted night service that allowed the Buses to run until midnight on heavily traveled routes. In addition METS added service outside the city limits to the University of Southern Indiana just west of Evansville and expanded further east past Burkhart Road. In 1998 METS also established a connection service on the far east and west, with the West Connection being fixed route and primarily used for students at the University of Southern Indiana, and the East Connection which provides curb service and connects to other buses at the Eastland Mall and Lawndale transfer points.

== Current service ==
METS currently operates 22 fixed city routes and two intercity connection routes. They also run the campus shuttle at the University of Southern Indiana and mobility/para-transit service. Despite the 1998 changes, METS service is still limited; some buses run on Sundays from 6:00 am to 6:00 pm. In addition, no direct bus service exists between Evansville and neighboring Henderson, Kentucky (served by sister agency Henderson Area Rapid Transit), though a recent survey by HART indicated this was the #1 most desired feature by that agency's ridership. METS now meets up with WATS buses for connecting service to Newburgh, Booneville, and Chandler. METS also operates a higher percentage of hybrid-electric transit buses than standard diesel buses and was the first in the state of Indiana to operate them in revenue service.

=== Routes ===
- Covert Ave A & B
- East Connection
- First Ave/North Park
- Fulton
- Howell
- Lincoln A & B
- Oakhill/Lynch
- Mary/Tekoppel A & B
- Riverside A & B
- Shopper Shuttle B (Connects to WATS buses for Newburgh, Chandler, & Boonville)
- Stringtown A
- Walnut
- Washington A & B
- West Connection
- Red Line (USI Campus Shuttle)
- Blue Line (USI Campus Shuttle)
- Green Line (USI Campus Shuttle)
- Mary/Howell (Night Service Only)
- Stringtown/First Avenue (Night Service Only)

=== METS Micro ===
In November 2023, METS launched a microtransit service known as METS Micro. The system serves the east side of the city and runs 7 days a week.

== Fares and passes ==
Base fare is $0.75 (children below age 6 ride free when accompanied by a paying rider; limit is 3). Reduced fares of $0.50 are offered to students with student ID. A reduced fare of $0.35 is available for senior citizens, the disabled, and Medicare card holders via application at the METS office. Riders can also purchase a monthly pass for $60. METS Mobility Fares are $1.50 standard fare, $3.00 convenience fare, and $5.00 for county fare; county fares are any fare inside the Vanderburgh County but outside of Evansville city limits.

== METS Downtown Terminal ==
The METS Downtown Terminal, located at 103 NW 6th St, serves as the primary transfer point for the system. The terminal was opened in April 1989 with 16 bus bays and a covered waiting area.

== Fixed route ridership ==
The ridership statistics shown here are of fixed route services only and do not include demand response services.

== See also ==
- List of bus transit systems in the United States
- Bloomington Transit
- Evansville L&N Station
