= 2005 Evansville tornado =

Deadly F3 tornado in Evansville, Indiana

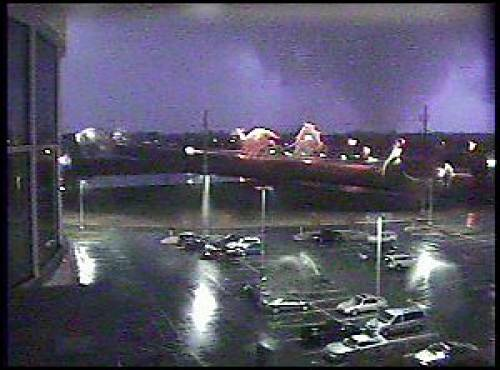
- Clockwise from top: The Evansville tornado of November 6, 2005, taken by a webcam at Deaconess Women’s Hospital in Newburgh. This is the only known photo of the tornado.; NEXRAD radar imagery of the Evansville tornado right as it struck the Eastbrook Mobile Home park; Destruction of several mobile homes in the mobile home park.

Meteorological history
- Formed: November 6, 2005, 1:39 a.m. CST (UTC–05:00)
- Dissipated: November 6, 2005, 2:24 a.m. CST (UTC–05:00)
- Duration: 45 minutes

F3 tornado
- on the Fujita scale
- Max width: 500 yd (0.28 mi; 0.46 km)
- Path length: 41.6 mi (66.9 km)
- Highest winds: 200 mph (320 km/h)

Overall effects
- Fatalities: 24
- Injuries: 238
- Damage: $87.26 million (2005 USD)
- Areas affected: Henderson County, Kentucky; Vanderburgh, Warrick, and Spencer counties, Indiana
- Part of the Tornadoes of 2005

During the overnight hours of November 6, 2005, an intense, destructive, and deadly high-end F3 nocturnal tornado inflicted severe destruction to areas around Evansville, Indiana. The tornado resulted in 24 confirmed fatalities across the region, making it the deadliest and most destructive November tornado in Indiana's history. The tornado also became the deadliest of the first decade of the 2000s. The tornado touched down in Kentucky near the community of Smith Mills.

This tornado occurred in a small outbreak of nine tornadoes that span from November 5 to November 6, taking place across the Mississippi Valley and the Midwest.

== Meteorological synopsis ==
The system formed on a warm front that tracked across the Midwest and stretched from the northern Great Lakes into Tennessee. The front was enhanced by a strong jet stream and warm, humid air ahead of it, allowing thunderstorms to develop. A severe thunderstorm watch was issued for the region just west of Evansville as the main threat appeared to be straight-line winds. The system had formed into a squall line but at about 1:30 am CST (0730 UTC), the squall line broke up in the Ohio Valley area, as the low-level jet intensified, allowing embedded tornadoes to form rapidly out of newly formed supercells. They were fairly isolated (only nine were confirmed across the entire region over 24 hours) but three significant tornadoes formed from two simultaneous supercells in southern Indiana and western Kentucky — one of them was the F3 tornado. Dew points were in the upper 50°s along with CAPE reaching up to 1,000 J/kg. The threat for damaging winds was expected to lessen throughout the night due to stabilization in the atmosphere. By the time the squall line reached southern Indiana and portions of Kentucky, the chance of an isolated tornado threat was noted by the Storm Prediction Center. SRH in the 0-1 kilometer (0-0.6 mile) portion of the atmosphere had reached 340 m2/s2.

== Tornado Summary ==
In the early morning hours of November 6, 2005 at around 1:39 am CST (0739 UTC), this devastating and deadly F3 tornado touched down 2 miles (3.2 km) north-northwest of Smith Mills in Henderson County, Kentucky. The tornado moved northeast, snapping numerous trees, destroying a farmhouse, and throwing a pickup truck into a field. The tornado then crossed the Ohio River and moved across a rural peninsula of Vanderburgh County, Indiana. Few structures were impacted in this rural area, though a two-story house built in 1875 sustained major roof damage, and tree branches were embedded into the walls of the house. One farm equipment shed was demolished, and another sustained major damage. A 10,000-pound truck was flipped over, and heavy farm equipment was moved several feet. Aerial surveys revealed distinct spiral-shaped scour marks in farm fields in this area. The tornado crossed the river again back into Kentucky, causing extensive tree damage on both sides of the river.

The tornado crossed the Ohio River a third time into a small portion of Kentucky situated on the north bank of the river. Almost immediately after crossing the river, the tornado tore through the Ellis Park horse racing facility. There was extensive damage to grandstands and housing facilities for jockeys. A few racehorses were killed there. The tornado then re-entered Indiana and moved across the southern fringes of Evansville. Here, the tornado ripped directly through the Eastbrook Mobile Home Park, obliterating numerous mobile homes and killing 20 people. Of about 350 mobile homes in the park, 100 were destroyed and another 125 were damaged. The coroner reported that most of the victims were probably killed instantly, many by spine and skull fractures. Several bodies were carried almost two hundred yards. The tornado then crossed into Warrick County, Indiana at the Angel Mounds State Historic Site. Several permanent homes were destroyed in this area, along with many others on the north side of Newburgh. Past Newburgh, the tornado reached its peak intensity of high-end F3 as it tore through an industrial park near Paradise, completely destroying several buildings at that location. Further northeast, the tornado passed just south of Boonville and caused a fatality in a mobile home. The tornado then tore directly through the small community of DeGonia Springs, tossing vehicles and destroying homes. Some of the homes in the community were leveled, and three people were killed in a mobile home in this area, including a woman who was 8 months pregnant. The tornado began to rapidly weaken as it passed just south of Tennyson and dissipated near Gentryville as it crossed into Spencer County, Indiana. Overall, the tornado damaged or destroyed 500 buildings, killed 24 people, and injured 238 others.

Tornado warnings were in effect at the time and issued on average about 30 minutes before the tornado hit, but few people were alerted as many were asleep as the tornado hit in the overnight hours. The local NOAA Weather Radio transmitter was experiencing technical difficulties at the time, causing some weather radios to not sound an alarm.

== Other tornadoes ==
Confirmed tornadoes by Fujita rating
FU	F0	F1	F2	F3	F4	F5	Total
0	1	2	4	1	0	0	8

=== November 5 event ===
F#	Location	County	State	Time (UTC)	Path length	Damage
F1	E of Garrison to S of Ava	Christian, Douglas	MO	02:00–?	17 miles (29 km)	One home sustained minor damage.
F1	E of Moko to Camp	Fulton	AR	03:59–?	5.4 miles (8.7 kilometers)	A house had shingles torn off, a window blown out, and the porch was shifted. One person in the house sustained minor injuries from flying debris. Another house had broken windows and several outbuildings were destroyed. Farm machinery was overturned and several vehicles sustained damage. Numerous trees were downed or snapped off along the path.
F2	E of Thayer to NE Myrtle	Oregon	MO	04:20–?	9 mi (14 km)	Two mobile homes were destroyed and other homes were severely damaged.
F2	Tucker	Oregon, Ripley	MO	04:39–?	7.4 mi (11.9 km)	A home and barn received extensive damage in the small community of Tucker.
F2	SW of Sitka	Sharp	AR	04:41–?	4.8 miles (7.7 km)	One mobile home was demolished, with contents strewn well across a field, and another was damaged. A storage shed was thrown across a road into trees, and a travel trailer was overturned. Falling trees destroyed a vacant house, and five vehicles were damaged, with windows being blown out. Numerous trees were uprooted or snapped off along the path. Three people were injured.

=== November 6 event ===
F#	Location	County	State	Time (UTC)	Path length	Damage
F3	NW of Mattoon to Wheatcroft	Crittenden, Webster	KY	07:46–?	11.2 miles (18 km)	In Crittenden County, the tornado destroyed a two-story house and a mobile home. Another home lost its roof, and numerous large trees were snapped and uprooted. A small boat was carried 400 yards, and a semi-truck was overturned on Highway 60. In Webster County, slight structural damage occurred, trees were snapped, a large shed door was blown off, and pillar columns at a house were bent. At the end of its path, the tornado struck Wheatcroft, where a tool shed was destroyed and two campers were overturned. A pickup truck without an engine was rolled about 200 feet, and the hood of the truck went through a window. Smaller trees and a house antenna were blown down as well. Five people were injured.
F2	Munfordville	Hart	KY	10:41–?	1 mile (1.6 km)	Tornado struck downtown Munfordville, where there was major damage to 44 homes and two businesses. A total of 25 homes were declared uninhabitable, and six businesses and 34 homes had minor damage. Munfordville Elementary School had part of its roof removed by the tornado. About 50 vehicles in a car dealership lot were totalled as well.
F0	Russellville	Brown	OH	12:20	0.1 miles (0.16 km)	Brief tornado downed a few trees in a field.

== Aftermath ==
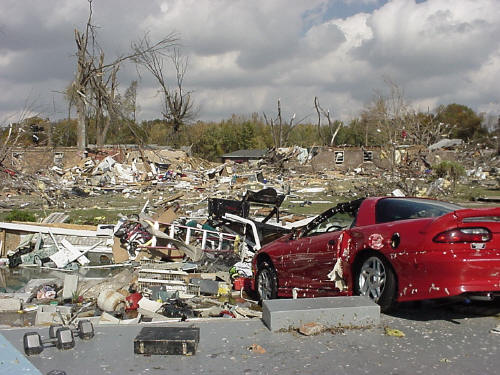
F3 tornado damage near Angel Mounds

Event death toll
State	Total	County	County total
Indiana	24	Vanderburgh	20
Indiana	24	Warrick	4
Totals	24		
All deaths were tornado-related

On August 12, 2006, a granite monument memorial was built at Eastbrook Mobile Home Park, along with a new playground dedicated to the children lost in the tornado. It was part of a campaign launched by two parents that lost children in the tornado. In addition, Rep. Phil Hoy introduced a bill called "CJ's law" which mandates that manufacturers of mobile homes install an operating weather radio with a separate power outlet in order to alert residents. It was named after victim C.J. Martin, who was two years old. Vanderburgh County also passed legislation toughening safety standards for their 3,100 mobile homes, requiring them to be more securely anchored with additional straps and braces.

Ellis Park was rebuilt and reopened on June 1, 2006, for training. The first races at the rebuilt facility were held on July 19, 2006.

The Evansville Chapter of Habitat for Humanity launched construction of "Operation Home Again," the New Haven Subdivision, which are new homes dedicated to the survivors of the tornado at Green River Road and Fickas Road. The subdivision has 55 homes and a playground/park. There are four streets in the subdivision – Inspiration Street, Healing Street, Promise Street, and Belief Street.

== See also ==
- List of North American tornadoes and tornado outbreaks
