= Interstate 164 =

Highway in Indiana

Interstate 164
- Robert D. Orr Highway
- I-164 highlighted in red

Route information
- Auxiliary route of I-64
- Length: 21.39 mi (34.42 km)
- Existed: 1968–2014
- History: Completed in 1990; Re-designated as I-69 in 2014
- NHS: Entire route

Major junctions
- West end: US 41 / Veterans Memorial Parkway in Evansville
- North end: I-64 / I-69 near Evansville

Location
- Country: United States
- State: Indiana
- Counties: Vanderburgh, Warrick, Gibson

Highway system
- Interstate Highway System; Main; Auxiliary; Suffixed; Business; Future; Indiana State Highway System; Interstate; US; State; Scenic
| ← SR 164 | → SR 165 |

Interstate 164 (I-164) was a spur highway of I-64, between that highway and U.S. Highway 41 (US 41) in Evansville, Indiana. I-164, also known as the Robert D. Orr Highway, had a total length of 21.24 miles (34.18 km) and was the only auxiliary route of I-64 in Indiana. Requested as an Interstate and approved in 1968, the freeway was opened to traffic on August 2, 1990.

On November 15, 2013, the Indiana Department of Transportation (INDOT) announced that 20.70 miles (33.31 km) of I-164 would be renumbered I-69, an action completed in late 2014. The highway thereby became part of an extended I-69 whose route will run north from the Texas border with Mexico to the Michigan border with Canada near Port Huron.

== Route description ==
Currently signed as I-69, I-164 was signed north–south as it wrapped around the east side of the metropolitan area and then east–west as it curved to meet US 41. West of US 41, the freeway became Veterans Memorial Parkway, an urban surface arterial which provides a direct connection with Evansville's central business district. The highway paralleled the Ohio River as it passed around the south side of Evansville. About 4 miles (6.4 km) after Veterans Parkway, I-164 turned north and almost immediately had an interchange with SR 66, locally known as the Lloyd Expressway, which is a mostly limited access surface arterial through Evansville with several at grade intersections. After passing SR 62 (Morgan Ave), the route exited Evansville and continued through suburban area. Near the northern end of the route, SR 57 started a brief concurrency with the Interstate Highway. I-164 ended at a cloverleaf interchange with I-64, and SR 57 continued north as a two-lane surface highway. However, in the mid-2000s, construction of I-69 north of I-64 began, and now continues north on a concurrency with SR 57.

== History ==
On October 18, 2013, the American Association of State Highway and Transportation Officials approved an INDOT request to redesignate 20.70 miles (33.31 km) of I-164 to I-69 between US 41 and I-64, pending approval from the Federal Highway Administration. On November 15, 2013, INDOT announced that I-164 would become part of I-69, an action completed in late 2014. When the I-69 Ohio River Crossing is complete roughly 2.5 miles (4.0 km) east of US 41, the remainder of the former spur will become an extension of Veterans Memorial Parkway.

== Exit list ==
| County | Location | mi | km | Exit | Destinations | Notes |
|---|---|---|---|---|---|---|
| Vanderburgh | Evansville | 0.00 | 0.00 | 0 | US 41 / Veterans Memorial Parkway – Henderson, Evansville | Roadway continued as Veterans Memorial Parkway beyond US 41 |
| Vanderburgh | Evansville | 2.85 | 4.59 | 3 | Green River Road | |
| Warrick | Ohio Township | 5.66 | 9.11 | 5 | SR 662 east / Covert Avenue – Newburgh | Western terminus of SR 662 |
| Vanderburgh | Evansville | 7.18 | 11.56 | 7 | SR 66 (Lloyd Expressway) | Signed as exits 7A (east) and 7B (west) |
| Vanderburgh | Knight Township | 8.74 | 14.07 | 9 | SR 62 (Morgan Avenue) – Evansville, Boonville | |
| Vanderburgh | Knight Township | 9.40 | 15.13 | 10 | Lynch Road | Exit opened in 2007 |
| Vanderburgh | Scott Township | 15.18 | 24.43 | 15 | Boonville–New Harmony Road | |
| Vanderburgh | Scott Township | 19.07 | 30.69 | 18 | SR 57 south – Evansville | Southern end of SR 57 concurrency; signed as exit 19 southbound |
| Gibson–Warrick county line | Johnson–Greer township line | 20.30 | 32.67 | 21 | I-64 – Louisville, St. Louis I-69 north / SR 57 north – Petersburg, Washington, Indianapolis | Northern end of SR 57 concurrency; continuation beyond I-64 as I-69/SR 57; signed as exits 21A (east) and 21B (west) |
1.000 mi = 1.609 km; 1.000 km = 0.621 mi: Concurrency terminus
