= Tecumseh Junior – Senior High School =

Tecumseh High School

Location
- 5244 State Road 68; Lynnville, Warrick County, Indiana 47619; United States; 38°11′40″N 87°20′30″W

Information
- Type: Public high school
- Established: 1982
- Locale: Rural
- School district: Warrick County School Corporation
- Superintendent: Abbie Redmon
- Principal: Shane Browder
- Faculty: 26.00 (FTE)
- Grades: 9–12
- Enrollment: 286 (2023–24)
- Student to teacher ratio: 11.00
- Color
- Athletics conference: Pocket Athletic Conference
- Team name: Braves
- Gym Capacity: 3,000
- Website: tecumseh.warrick.k12.in.us

Tecumseh High School (previously Tecumseh Junior – Senior High School) is a public high school in Lynnville, Indiana. Its athletic nickname is the "Braves", and it participates in the Pocket Athletic Conference, although in 2007 the football program left the conference and began playing independently. It is a grade 9–12 education facility operated by the Warrick County School Corporation. The campus sits in between the towns of Lynnville and Elberfeld, the towns from which students attend. Students from the town of Selvin also attend THS.

Correct pronunciation of the school is /təˈkʌmsi/tə-KUM-see. The school was named after the now-defunct Tecumseh coal mines outside of Lynnville, which were operated by Peabody Coal Company, now Peabody Energy.

Tecumseh High School was created in 1965 as a result of the consolidation of Lynnville High School and Elberfeld High School. Selvin High School had been folded into Lynnville in 1962. From 1965 to 1982, Tecumseh was a 9–12 high school located in the former Lynnville High School building. Grades 7–8 had been housed at Lynnville Elementary School and Elberfeld Elementary School. A new building, which houses grades 7–12, opened in 1982, and the name was formally changed to "Tecumseh Junior – Senior High School". The new Tecumseh Middle School opened in August 2016 and now houses grades 6–8.

A plan in 2008 to move grade 6 to the facility to make Tecumseh a middle-high school by 2011 faced opposition and wasn't implemented. The proposed move would have brought Tecumseh into line with the school corporation's desire to move from a junior high to middle school concept countywide. The concept was implemented at the remaining county schools.

== Facilities ==
The campus consists of a main school building, tennis courts, a softball field, greenhouse, baseball training buildings, and a house and barn in the back. The school is divided into 2 and a half levels, the upper levels mainly reserved for upperclassmen and the lower reserved for the junior high students. The wood shop, agriculture classes, the cafeteria and pool are located on the mid-level. The art class is located on the lower level. A family and consumer sciences (formerly known as home economics) classroom is located on the upper level. This school has no elevator, but is ADA compliant with a large ramp. A new sports complex is being built behind the school was completed in 2014. The school's track, football field, and baseball field are still located near the former high school location in the town of Lynnville (3 miles away) and next to Lynnville Elementary School.

== Athletics ==
IHSAA State Championships
Sport	Year(s)
Boys Basketball (1)	1999
Girls Basketball (1)	2022
Baseball (1)	2023
Softball (7)	2009, 2011, 2017, 2022, 2023, 2025, 2026

== See also ==
- List of high schools in Indiana
