= Yankeetown site =

- Yankeetown Archeological Site
- U.S. National Register of Historic Places
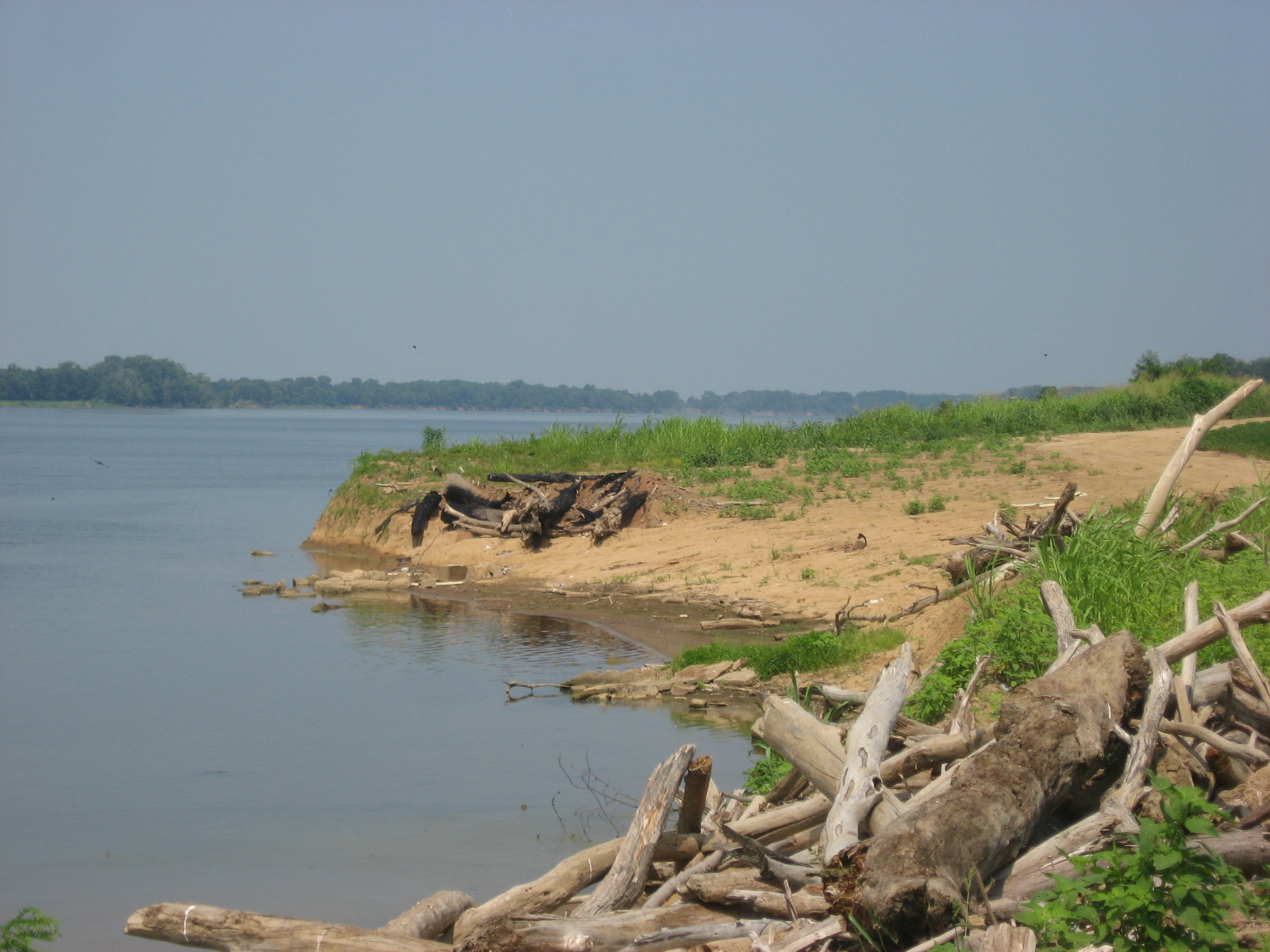
- Eastern portion of the site

- Location within Indiana Location within the United States
- Location: Along the Ohio River bank in Section 21 of Anderson Township, south of Yankeetown, Indiana
- Coordinates: 37°54′1″N 87°18′22″W
- Area: 140 acres (57 ha)
- NRHP reference No.: 79000026
- Added to NRHP: February 28, 1979

The Yankeetown Site (12W1) is a substantial archaeological site along the Ohio River in the southwestern part of the U.S. state of Indiana. Inhabited during the prehistoric Woodland period, the site has yielded important information about Woodland-era peoples in the region, but it has been damaged by substantial erosion. Despite the damage, it has been a historic site for more than thirty years.

== Geology ==
Yankeetown lies primarily in Section 21 of Anderson Township in Warrick County. Because of the presence of the Ohio River, this section is a tiny riverside triangle, unlike the mile-square sections to the east and north. The present-day unincorporated community of Yankeetown lies approximately 1.5 miles (2.4 km) north of the site; a road runs from the town to the riverside, and the road/river junction marks one end of the site's core section. This section extends along the riverbank for about 0.75 miles (1.21 km) downstream from the road, The riverbank core of the site has experienced extensive damage from erosion by the river: in 1950, landowners along the river stated that approximately 20 feet (6.1 m) of the bank were cut away annually.

== Excavations ==
Glenn Albert Black visited Yankeetown in April 1950 with three companions; the four surveyed the site carefully and began cataloging artifacts found there. Heavy erosion permitted them to identify features such as pits and hearths, and artifacts such as clay pellets and bits of charcoal and burned clay were numerous. Four months later, a second survey investigated the site. Among its premier findings was the identification of a layer of daub about 8 inches (200 mm) below the surface at the site's low end; although it was only 10 feet (3.0 m) long, the layer was significant for its composition of burned debris, grass, and weeds, as well as for its place as the location of a depression that could have been the site of a house.

=== Specific artifacts ===
Many artifacts found at Yankeetown are curated in the museum at Angel Mounds State Memorial in nearby Evansville, although the second 1950 survey kept its findings separate from those at Angel, and the landowner maintained a substantial collection. More than six thousand sherds from Yankeetown were curated at Angel; the majority of those known in 1950 were tempered with clay and/or grit, although six hundred bore evidence of shell tempering, and only about five hundred lacked evidence of a tempering agent. Meanwhile, large numbers of the sherds are plain; hundreds have been found marked with cords or incisions, but approximately 64% of the pottery known in 1950 was completely undecorated. Rarer items found at Yankeetown include flint knives, hammerstones, trowels, lithic flakes, bones, objects of cannel coal, and two damaged pottery effigies of women with everything below the shoulders broken off.

Cultural materials were moved to Bloomington when the Glenn A. Black Laboratory of Archaeology opened in 1971.

== Conclusions ==
The second 1950 survey named Yankeetown the type site for a variety of pottery that had been subjected both to appliqué and to incision; when found elsewhere, it was called "Yankeetown fillet" or "Yankeetown incised".

Yankeetown-like objects have been found far away from Yankeetown; they are known farther north than Vincennes, Indiana on the Wabash, at the Great Salt Spring in Gallatin County, Illinois, and in the Illinois side of the St. Louis metropolitan area. It appears to be related to another Late Woodland manifestation known as the Duffy complex, which is known from a small group of sites near the mouth of the Wabash; both Yankeetown and Duffy have been found at the Great Salt Spring, but the precise relationship between the two is unclear.

== Preservation ==
Preservation of the Yankeetown Site has been difficult, due to erosion by the river, although the curation of artifacts at the Angel museum has assisted in saving information about the site. In order to facilitate further preservation work, the site was listed on the National Register of Historic Places in 1979. It is one of eight National Register-listed locations in Warrick County; other county sites with this designation include a portion of the Angel Mounds State Memorial and a nearby Caborn-Welborn Mississippian site, the Ellerbusch site.

== See also ==
- List of archaeological sites on the National Register of Historic Places in Indiana
