= Victoria Woods, Indiana =

- Town
- Interactive map of Victoria Woods, Indiana
- Coordinates: 38°0′22″N 87°19′36″W
- Country: United States
- State: Indiana
- County: Warrick
- Township: Boon

Area
  - Total: 0.925 sq mi (2.40 km^{2})
- Time zone: UTC-6 (Central (CST))
  - Summer (DST): UTC-5 (CDT)

Victoria Woods is a town in Boon Township, Warrick County, in the U.S. state of Indiana. The Warrick County Board of Commissioners voted to incorporate the town in April 2023. It was the first municipality to be incorporated in the state of Indiana in over twenty years.
