= Fisherville =

Fisherville may refer to some places in North America:

Canada

- Fisherville, British Columbia, a one-time gold-mining boom town
- Fisherville, Ontario

United States

- Fisherville, Indiana
- Fisherville, Louisville, Kentucky, a neighborhood
- Fisherville, Blair County, Pennsylvania
- Fisherville, Dauphin County, Pennsylvania
- Fisherville, Tennessee
- Mereta, Texas, also called Fisherville
- Fisherville, Wisconsin, an unincorporated community
