= Pigeon Township, Warrick County, Indiana =

Pigeon Township
- Township
- Location in Warrick County
- Coordinates: 38°10′02″N 87°04′53″W
- Country: United States
- State: Indiana
- County: Warrick

Government
  - Type: Indiana township

Area
  - Total: 40.58 sq mi (105.1 km^{2})
  - Land: 40.47 sq mi (104.8 km^{2})
  - Water: 0.11 sq mi (0.28 km^{2}) 0.27%
- Elevation: 410 ft (125 m)

Population (2020)
  - Total: 950
  - Density: 24.2/sq mi (9.3/km^{2})
- ZIP codes: 47523, 47541, 47637
- GNIS feature ID: 0453733

Pigeon Township is one of ten townships in Warrick County, Indiana, United States. As of the 2010 census, its population was 979 and it contained 436 housing units.

== History ==
Pigeon Township was created out of Owen Township in September 1849. The township derives its name from the Little Pigeon River.

== Geography ==
According to the 2010 census, the township has a total area of 40.58 square miles (105.1 km^{2}), of which 40.47 square miles (104.8 km^{2}) (or 99.73%) is land and 0.11 square miles (0.28 km^{2}) (or 0.27%) is water.

=== Unincorporated towns ===
- Heilman at 38.157551°N 87.090278°W
- Loafers Station at 38.125606°N 87.118057°W
- Selvin at 38.204218°N 87.106112°W

(This list is based on USGS data and may include former settlements.)

=== Adjacent townships ===
- Cass Township, Dubois County (northeast)
- Carter Township, Spencer County (east)
- Clay Township, Spencer County (southeast)
- Jackson Township, Spencer County (south)
- Skelton Township (southwest)
- Lane Township (west)
- Owen Township (west)
- Lockhart Township, Pike County (northwest)

=== Cemeteries ===
The township contains these five cemeteries: Avery, Bruce, Chinn, Twin and Wetherill.

== School districts ==
- Warrick County School Corporation

== Political districts ==
- Indiana's 8th congressional district
- State House District 74
- State Senate District 47
