= Loafers Station, Indiana =

- Unincorporated community
- Location within Indiana Location within the United States
- Coordinates: 38°07′32″N 87°07′04″W
- Country: United States
- State: Indiana
- County: Warrick
- Township: Pigeon
- Elevation: 490 ft (150 m)
- Time zone: UTC-6 (Central (CST))
  - Summer (DST): UTC-5 (CDT)
- ZIP code: 47537
- Area codes: 812, 930
- GNIS feature ID: 438194

Loafers Station was a community in Pigeon Township, Warrick County, in the U.S. state of Indiana.

== History ==
Also known as Louisville, the community was a sizable village in 1820 and was often visited by a young Abraham Lincoln. The community had a Baptist church, and in 1884 was reported to contain two saloons, a post office, a store, and a mill, as well as a dozen homes. That same year, railroad construction bypassed Loafer's Station and went through Tennyson, Indiana, instead, leading to the abandonment of Loafer's Station. By 1927, none of the building's villages were still standing.

== Geography ==
Loafers Station was located at 38°07′32″N 87°07′04″W.
