= Owen Township, Warrick County, Indiana =

Owen Township
- Township
- Location in Warrick County
- Coordinates: 38°09′08″N 87°11′15″W
- Country: United States
- State: Indiana
- County: Warrick

Government
  - Type: Indiana township

Area
  - Total: 25.48 sq mi (66.0 km^{2})
  - Land: 25.09 sq mi (65.0 km^{2})
  - Water: 0.39 sq mi (1.0 km^{2}) 1.53%
- Elevation: 486 ft (148 m)

Population (2020)
  - Total: 646
  - Density: 24.4/sq mi (9.4/km^{2})
- ZIP codes: 47601, 47637
- GNIS feature ID: 453703

Owen Township is one of ten townships in Warrick County, Indiana, United States. As of the 2010 census, its population was 611 and it contained 249 housing units.

== History ==
Owen Township was organized in 1848, and named for Robert Dale Owen, an Indiana politician.

== Geography ==
According to the 2010 census, the township has a total area of 25.48 square miles (66.0 km^{2}), of which 25.09 square miles (65.0 km^{2}) (or 98.47%) is land and 0.39 square miles (1.0 km^{2}) (or 1.53%) is water.

=== Unincorporated towns ===
- Dickeyville at 38.15616°N 87.219727°W
- Folsomville at 38.129216°N 87.164169°W

(This list is based on USGS data and may include former settlements.)

=== Adjacent townships ===
- Lane Township (north)
- Pigeon Township (east)
- Skelton Township (southeast)
- Boon Township (southwest)
- Hart Township (west)

=== Cemeteries ===
The township contains these four cemeteries: Barrenfork, Leslie, Saint Clair and Shiloh.

=== Lakes ===
- Hendrickson Lake

== School districts ==
- Warrick County School Corporation

== Political districts ==
- Indiana's 8th congressional district
- State House District 74
- State Senate District 47
