= Skelton Township, Warrick County, Indiana =

Skelton Township
- Township
- Location in Warrick County
- Coordinates: 38°04′41″N 87°09′07″W
- Country: United States
- State: Indiana
- County: Warrick

Government
  - Type: Indiana township

Area
  - Total: 39.91 sq mi (103.4 km^{2})
  - Land: 39.54 sq mi (102.4 km^{2})
  - Water: 0.37 sq mi (0.96 km^{2}) 0.93%
- Elevation: 423 ft (129 m)

Population (2020)
  - Total: 1,533
  - Density: 41.1/sq mi (15.9/km^{2})
- ZIP codes: 47523, 47601, 47637
- GNIS feature ID: 0453850

Skelton Township is one of ten townships in Warrick County, Indiana, United States. As of the 2010 census, its population was 1,625 and it contained 635 housing units.

== History ==
Skelton Township was organized in about 1820. The township was named for Zachariah Skelton, a local judge.

== Geography ==
According to the 2010 census, the township has a total area of 39.91 square miles (103.4 km^{2}), of which 39.54 square miles (102.4 km^{2}) (or 99.07%) is land and 0.37 square miles (0.96 km^{2}) (or 0.93%) is water.

=== Cities, towns, villages ===
- Tennyson

=== Unincorporated towns ===
- Ash Iron Springs at 38.035326°N 87.186669°W
- De Gonia Springs at 38.055604°N 87.185558°W
- Eames at 38.079216°N 87.131668°W

(This list is based on USGS data and may include former settlements.)

=== Adjacent townships ===
- Pigeon Township (northeast)
- Jackson Township, Spencer County (east)
- Grass Township, Spencer County (southeast)
- Boon Township (west)
- Owen Township (northwest)

=== Cemeteries ===
The township contains these eight cemeteries: Clark, Garrison, Kelley, Mill, Polk, Polk, Reed, Roth and Skelton.

== School districts ==
- Warrick County School Corporation

== Political districts ==
- Indiana's 8th congressional district
- State House District 74
- State Senate District 47
