= Campbell Township, Warrick County, Indiana =

Campbell Township Warrick County
- Township
- Location in Warrick County
- Coordinates: 38°05′30″N 87°25′04″W
- Country: United States
- State: Indiana
- County: Warrick

Government
  - Type: Indiana township

Area
  - Total: 40.17 sq mi (104.0 km^{2})
  - Land: 39.48 sq mi (102.3 km^{2})
  - Water: 0.69 sq mi (1.8 km^{2}) 1.72%
- Elevation: 413 ft (126 m)

Population (2020)
  - Total: 1,119
  - Density: 22.9/sq mi (8.8/km^{2})
- ZIP codes: 47601, 47610, 47613, 47619, 47725
- GNIS feature ID: 453156

Campbell Township is one of ten townships in Warrick County, Indiana, United States. As of the 2010 census, its population was 906 and it contained 353 housing units.

== History ==
Campbell Township was organized before 1823. The township was named for Thomas Campbell, a pioneer settler.

== Geography ==
According to the 2010 census, the township has a total area of 40.17 square miles (104.0 km^{2}), of which 39.48 square miles (102.3 km^{2}) (or 98.28%) is land and 0.69 square miles (1.8 km^{2}) (or 1.72%) is water.

=== Unincorporated towns ===
- Fisherville at 38.085322°N 87.433068°W
- Millersburg at 38.097823°N 87.399734°W
- Saint John at 38.079210°N 87.450013°W

(This list is based on USGS data and may include former settlements.)

=== Adjacent townships ===
- Greer Township (north)
- Hart Township (northeast)
- Boon Township (east)
- Ohio Township (south)
- Knight Township, Vanderburgh County (southwest)
- Center Township, Vanderburgh County (west)
- Scott Township, Vanderburgh County (west)

=== Cemeteries ===
The township contains these nine cemeteries: Asbury, Crossroad, Miller Cemetery, Millersburg, Hay, Weyerbacher Rd., Gander, St. Johns, and Feagley. Other small private cemeteries may exist on open land. Mining activities may have obscured the sites for certain small private cemeteries in Campbell Township. Miller Cemetery may readily be found near the NW corner of the intersection of State Street and Miller, Cemetery Road, formerly called old New Harmony Road.

== School districts ==
- Warrick County School Corporation

== Political districts ==
- Indiana's 8th congressional district
- State House District 75
- State Senate District 50
