= Indiana Southern Railroad =

Class 3 railroad operating in Indiana

Overview
- Parent company: Genesee and Wyoming
- Headquarters: Petersburg, Indiana
- Reporting mark: ISRR
- Locale: Indiana
- Dates of operation: 1992–present

Technical
- Track gauge: 4 ft 8 1/2 in (1,435 mm) standard gauge
- Length: 190 miles (310 km)

Other
- Website: Official website

The Indiana Southern Railroad (reporting mark ISRR) is a Class III, short line railroad operating in the United States state of Indiana. It began operations in 1992 as a RailTex property and was acquired by RailAmerica in 2000. RailAmerica was itself acquired by Genesee & Wyoming in December 2012.

Indiana Southern Railroad operates 190 miles (310 km) of track between Indianapolis and Evansville. From Mars Hill (a neighborhood on the southwest side of Indianapolis) southwest through Martinsville and Spencer to Bee Hunter in Greene County, the ISRR runs on tracks that once made up the majority of the former Indianapolis & Vincennes Branch of the Pennsylvania Railroad. State Route 67 parallels the ISRR along much of this section. From Bee Hunter to Elnora the ISRR has trackage rights over the Indiana Rail Road. ISRR tracks resume from Elnora through Washington in Daviess County, Petersburg in Pike County, Oakland City in Gibson County, Elberfeld in Warrick County and Daylight in Vanderburgh County before terminating in Evansville along the former New York Central's Evansville & Indianapolis Branch.

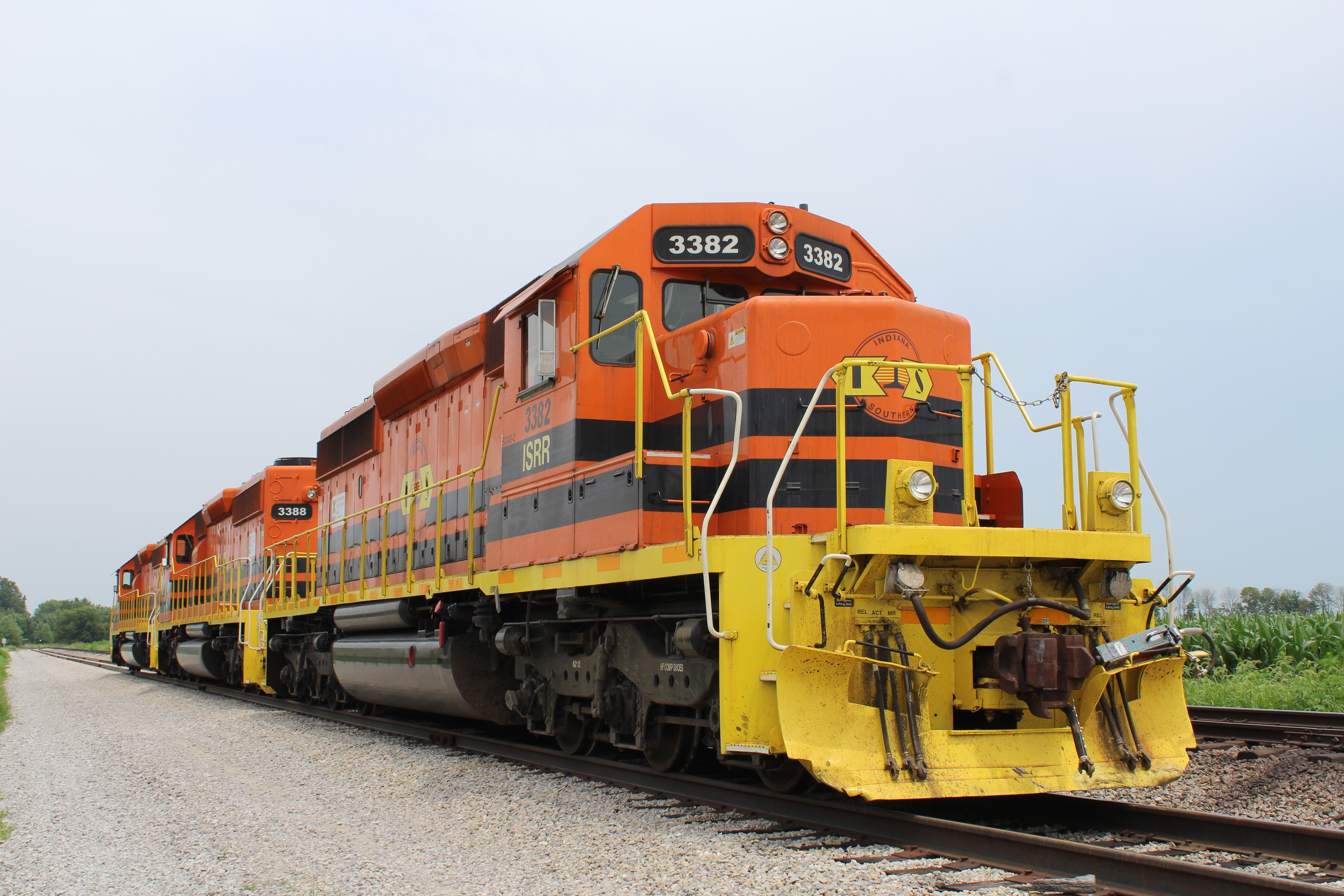
Indiana Southern Railroad SD40-2s parked near the interchange with INRD south of Bee Hunter, IN.

== Locomotive fleet ==
The Indiana Southern began operations with a fleet of 10 ex-CSX EMD GP40 locomotives which were rebuilt without dynamic brakes and identified as GP40-1s.

As of 2018, the ISRR operated 10 ex-BNSF EMD SD40-2 locomotives acquired from First Union Railway Equipment in 2013 after the railroad became Genesee & Wyoming property. Additionally, the railroad owns two G&W rebuilt GP40-3 locomotives, 3051 and 3052. ISRR 3051 was rebuilt from ISRR 4051, one of the original GP40-1s originally fleeted and is the only remaining original member of the fleet. Finally, ISRR operates an ex-Toledo, Peoria & Western GP40 painted in the Rail America paint scheme. It is the only remaining member of the fleet not in Genesee & Wyoming paint.

== Operations ==
The Indiana Southern's traffic comes mainly from coal and grain products, including corn and soybeans. The ISRR hauled around 70,000 carloads in 2008 and can accommodate 286,000-pound (130,000 kg) railcars.

The railroad interchanges with CSX at the latter's Crawford Yard in Indianapolis and Wansford Yard in Evansville, the Indiana Rail Road in Switz City and Bee Hunter, and Norfolk Southern in Oakland City.

Just south of Indianapolis, the railroad serves transloading facility Kid Glove Services.

The railroad serves industries in Mooresville and a salt unloading facility in Martinsville. A siding between Whitaker and Gosport is regularly used for car storage; as is a small yard in Worthington on the former New York Central trackage.

The railroad supplies coal to power plants in Edwardsport and Petersburg. There are around 2 trains per week supplying the Edwardsport plant with coal and carrying byproducts from the plant.

The railroad also serves a grain elevator in Plainville and the Grain Processing Corporation in Washington.
