= Hart Township, Warrick County, Indiana =

Hart Township Warrick County
- Township
- Location in Warrick County
- Coordinates: 38°10′21″N 87°17′49″W
- Country: United States
- State: Indiana
- County: Warrick

Government
  - Type: Indiana township

Area
  - Total: 41.99 sq mi (108.8 km^{2})
  - Land: 41.24 sq mi (106.8 km^{2})
  - Water: 0.75 sq mi (1.9 km^{2}) 1.79%
- Elevation: 440 ft (134 m)

Population (2020)
  - Total: 1,553
  - Density: 39.4/sq mi (15.2/km^{2})
- ZIP codes: 47601, 47619
- GNIS feature ID: 453401

Hart Township is one of ten townships in Warrick County, Indiana, United States. As of the 2010 census, its population was 1,626 and it contained 691 housing units.

== History ==
Hart Township was organized in 1826. The township was named for John Hart, a local judge.

== Geography ==
According to the 2010 census, the township has a total area of 41.99 square miles (108.8 km^{2}), of which 41.24 square miles (106.8 km^{2}) (or 98.21%) is land and 0.75 square miles (1.9 km^{2}) (or 1.79%) is water.

=== Cities, towns, villages ===
- Lynnville

=== Unincorporated towns ===
- Eby at 38.141992°N 87.261395°W
- Graham Valley at 38.149492°N 87.290563°W
- Greenbrier at 38.120603°N 87.283618°W
- Stanley at 38.164491°N 87.355011°W
- Turpin Hill at 38.14227°N 87.290285°W

(This list is based on USGS data and may include former settlements.)

=== Adjacent townships ===
- Monroe Township, Pike County (north)
- Lane Township (east)
- Owen Township (east)
- Boon Township (south)
- Campbell Township (southwest)
- Greer Township (west)
- Barton Township, Gibson County (northwest)

=== Cemeteries ===
Hart township contains these six cemeteries: Lynnville, Massey, Morrison, Mount Olive, Mt. Zion, and Turpin Hill Cemetery

== School districts ==
- Warrick County School Corporation

== Political districts ==
- Indiana's 8th congressional district
- State House District 74
- State Senate District 50
