= Millersburg, Warrick County, Indiana =

Millersburg
- Unincorporated community
- Location within Indiana Location within the United States
- Coordinates: 38°5′52.2″N 87°23′59.0″W
- Country: United States
- State: Indiana
- County: Warrick
- Township: Ohio
- Elevation: 381 ft (116 m)
- Time zone: UTC-6 (Central (CST))
  - Summer (DST): UTC-5 (CDT)
- ZIP code: 47630
- Area codes: 812, 930
- GNIS feature ID: 439232

Millersburg is an unincorporated community, in Campbell Township, Warrick County, in the U.S. state of Indiana.

== History ==
Millersburg was laid out in 1850, and so named for the fact two mills stood near the site, one of which was owned by Phillip Miller. Millersburg's post office opened under the name Canal. This post office was established in 1851, and remained in operation until 1903.
