= Anderson Township, Warrick County, Indiana =

Anderson Township Warrick County
- Township
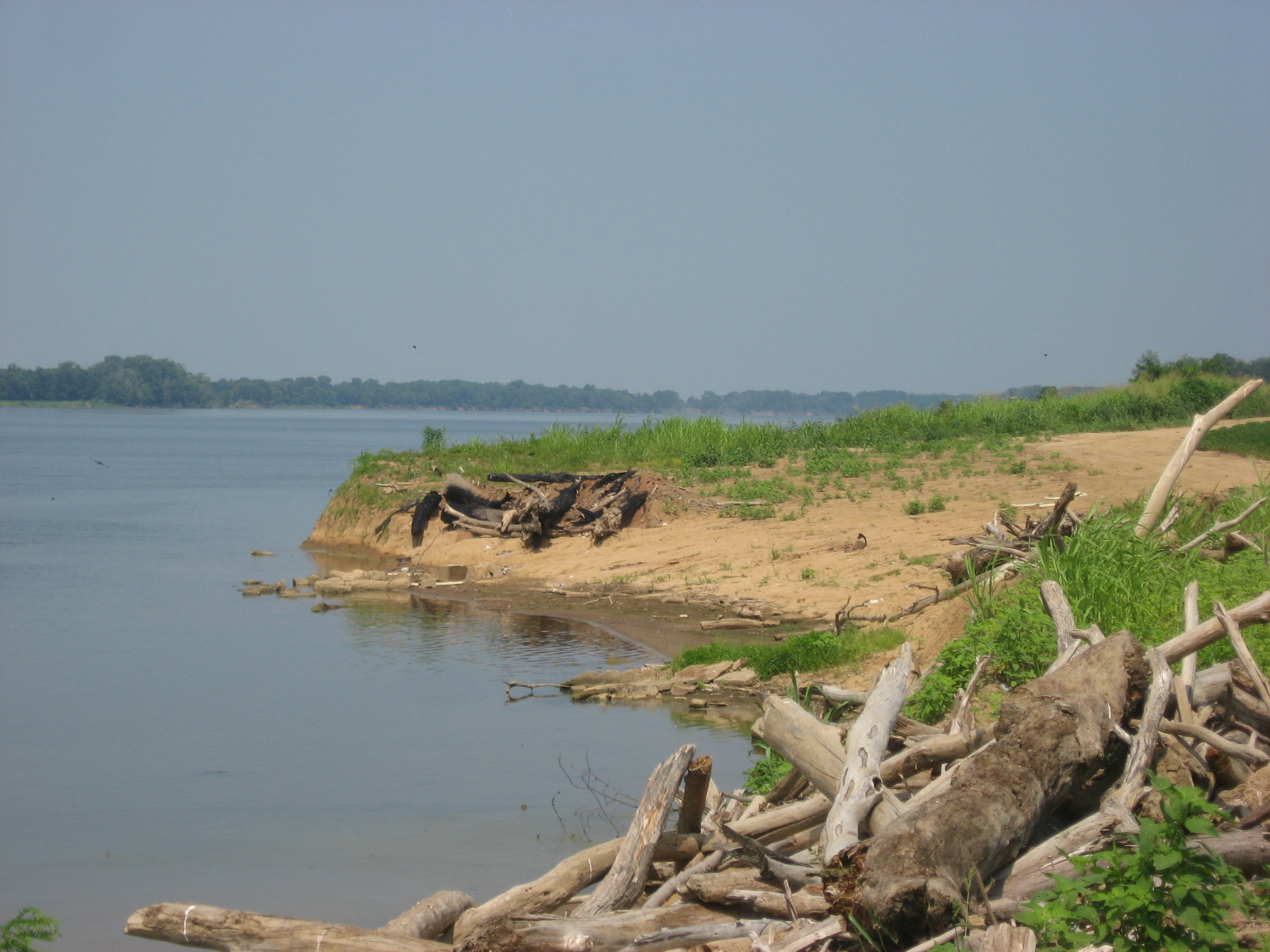
- Ohio River shoreline at the Yankeetown site

- Location in Warrick County
- Coordinates: 37°56′00″N 87°18′09″W
- Country: United States
- State: Indiana
- County: Warrick

Government
  - Type: Indiana township

Area
  - Total: 22.13 sq mi (57.3 km^{2})
  - Land: 20.72 sq mi (53.7 km^{2})
  - Water: 1.41 sq mi (3.7 km^{2}) 6.37%
- Elevation: 430 ft (130 m)

Population (2020)
  - Total: 1,191
  - Density: 61.5/sq mi (23.7/km^{2})
- ZIP codes: 47601, 47630
- GNIS feature ID: 453090

Anderson Township is one of ten townships in Warrick County, Indiana, United States. As of the 2010 census, its population was 1,274 and it contained 500 housing units.

== History ==
Southern Anderson Township is the location of the Yankeetown site, an important archaeological site from the Woodland and Mississippian periods.

Anderson Township was established in 1813. The township was named for Bailey Anderson, a pioneer settler.

== Geography ==
According to the 2010 census, the township has a total area of 22.13 square miles (57.3 km^{2}), of which 20.72 square miles (53.7 km^{2}) (or 93.63%) is land and 1.41 square miles (3.7 km^{2}) (or 6.37%) is water.

=== Cities, towns, villages ===
- Newburgh (east edge)

=== Unincorporated towns ===
- Red Brush at 37.938379°N 87.271948°W
- Vanada at 37.932267°N 87.364451°W
- Yankeetown at 37.917546°N 87.297782°W

(This list is based on USGS data and may include former settlements.)

=== Adjacent townships ===
- Boon Township (north)
- Luce Township, Spencer County (east)
- Ohio Township (northwest)

=== Cemeteries ===
The township contains Bates Hill Cemetery.

=== Rivers ===
- Ohio River

=== Lakes ===
- Collins Lake

== School districts ==
- Warrick County School Corporation

== Political districts ==
- Indiana's 8th congressional district
- State House District 74
- State House District 78
- State Senate District 47
- State Senate District 50
