= Lane Township, Warrick County, Indiana =

Lane Township Warrick County
- Township
- Location in Warrick County
- Coordinates: 38°12′19″N 87°10′55″W
- Country: United States
- State: Indiana
- County: Warrick

Government
  - Type: Indiana township

Area
  - Total: 23.95 sq mi (62.0 km^{2})
  - Land: 23.51 sq mi (60.9 km^{2})
  - Water: 0.43 sq mi (1.1 km^{2}) 1.80%
- Elevation: 449 ft (137 m)

Population (2020)
  - Total: 237
  - Density: 12/sq mi (4.6/km^{2})
- ZIP codes: 47523, 47601, 47619, 47637
- GNIS feature ID: 453541

Lane Township is one of ten townships in Warrick County, Indiana, United States. As of the 2010 census, its population was 281 and it contained 119 housing units.

== History ==
Lane Township was formed out of Owen Township in 1859. The township was named for Joseph Lane, a state legislator.

== Geography ==
According to the 2010 census, the township has a total area of 23.95 square miles (62.0 km^{2}), of which 23.51 square miles (60.9 km^{2}) (or 98.16%) is land and 0.43 square miles (1.1 km^{2}) (or 1.80%) is water.

=== Unincorporated towns ===
- Jockey at 38.178383°N 87.163336°W
- Scalesville at 38.20255°N 87.206116°W

(This list is based on USGS data and may include former settlements.)

=== Adjacent townships ===
- Lockhart Township, Pike County (northeast)
- Pigeon Township (east)
- Owen Township (south)
- Hart Township (west)
- Monroe Township, Pike County (northwest)

=== Cemeteries ===
The township contains these two cemeteries: Ashby and Ebenezer.

== School districts ==
- Warrick County School Corporation

== Political districts ==
- Indiana's 8th congressional district
- State House District 74
- State Senate District 47
