= Jockey, Indiana =

- Unincorporated community
- Location within Indiana Location within the United States
- Coordinates: 38°10′42″N 87°09′48″W
- Country: United States
- State: Indiana
- County: Warrick
- Township: Lane
- Elevation: 440 ft (134 m)
- Time zone: UTC-6 (Central (CST))
  - Summer (DST): UTC-5 (CDT)
- ZIP code: 47637
- Area codes: 812, 930
- GNIS feature ID: 437012

Jockey is an unincorporated community in Lane Township, Warrick County, in the U.S. state of Indiana.

== History ==
It has been theorized that the name comes from their history of selling horses, while others believe the name reflects the community's "shrewd dealings".

== Geography ==
Jockey is located at 38°10′42″N 87°09′48″W.
