= Stanley, Indiana =

- Unincorporated community
- Location within Indiana Location within the United States
- Coordinates: 38°09′52″N 87°21′18″W
- Country: United States
- State: Indiana
- County: Warrick
- Township: Hart
- Elevation: 460 ft (140 m)
- Time zone: UTC-6 (Central (CST))
  - Summer (DST): UTC-5 (CDT)
- ZIP code: 47619
- Area codes: 812, 930
- GNIS feature ID: 444060

Stanley was an unincorporated town in Hart Township, Warrick County, in the U.S. state of Indiana.

== History ==
A post office was established at Stanley in 1890, and remained in operation until it was discontinued in 1907.

The town no longer exists, being wiped out by strip mining.
