= Turpin Hill, Indiana =

- Unincorporated community
- Location within Indiana Location within the United States
- Coordinates: 38°08′32″N 87°17′25″W
- Country: United States
- State: Indiana
- County: Warrick
- Township: Hart
- Elevation: 482 ft (147 m)
- Time zone: UTC-6 (Central (CST))
  - Summer (DST): UTC-5 (CDT)
- ZIP code: 47601
- Area codes: 812, 930
- GNIS feature ID: 444995

Turpin Hill is an unincorporated community in Hart Township, Warrick County, in the U.S. state of Indiana. The counties that adjoin and form the boundaries of Warrick County: Dubois, Gibson, Pike, Spencer, Vanderburgh, Daviess (KY) & Henderson (KY).

== Geography ==
Turpin Hill is located at 38°08′32″N 87°17′25″W.
