= Scalesville, Indiana =

- Unincorporated community
- Location within Indiana Location within the United States
- Coordinates: 38°12′09″N 87°12′22″W
- Country: United States
- State: Indiana
- County: Warrick
- Township: Lane
- Elevation: 564 ft (172 m)
- Time zone: UTC-6 (Central (CST))
  - Summer (DST): UTC-5 (CDT)
- ZIP code: 47637
- Area codes: 812, 930
- GNIS feature ID: 443056

Scalesville is an unincorporated community in Lane Township, Warrick County, in the U.S. state of Indiana.

== History ==
A post office was established at Scalesville in 1879, and remained in operation until 1903. William Scales served as an early postmaster.

== Geography ==
Scalesville is located at 38°12′09″N 87°12′22″W.
