= Saint John, Warrick County, Indiana =

Saint John
- Unincorporated community
- Location within Indiana Location within the United States
- Coordinates: 38°04′55″N 87°26′58″W
- Country: United States
- State: Indiana
- County: Warrick
- Township: Campbell
- Elevation: 430 ft (130 m)
- Time zone: UTC-6 (Central (CST))
  - Summer (DST): UTC-5 (CDT)
- ZIP code: 47610
- Area code: 812
- GNIS feature ID: 446750

Saint John is an unincorporated community in Campbell Township, Warrick County, in the U.S. state of Indiana.

== History ==
The community took its name from Saint Johns Church.

== Geography ==
Saint John is located at 38°04′55″N 87°26′58″W.
