= Greenbrier, Warrick County, Indiana =

Greenbrier
- Unincorporated community
- Greenbrier's position in Indiana
- Coordinates: 38°07′14″N 87°17′01″W
- Country: United States
- State: Indiana
- County: Warrick
- Township: Hart
- Elevation: 476 ft (145 m)
- Time zone: UTC-6 (Central (CST))
  - Summer (DST): UTC-5 (CDT)
- ZIP code: 47601
- Area codes: 812, 930
- GNIS feature ID: 435425

Greenbrier is an unincorporated community in Hart Township, Warrick County, in the U.S. state of Indiana.

== History ==
On April 26, 2011, strong winds – probably a tornado – associated with the 2011 Super Outbreak hit Greenbrier, along Highway 61, uprooting trees, snapping power poles, and causing damages to structures.

== Geography ==
Greenbrier is located at 38°07′14″N 87°17′01″W.
