= New Hope, Warrick County, Indiana =

New Hope
- Unincorporated community
- Location within Indiana Location within the United States
- Coordinates: 37°59′23″N 87°13′24″W
- Country: United States
- State: Indiana
- County: Warrick
- Township: Boon
- Elevation: 449 ft (137 m)
- Time zone: UTC-6 (Central (CST))
  - Summer (DST): UTC-5 (CDT)
- ZIP code: 47601
- Area code: 812
- GNIS feature ID: 440058

New Hope is an unincorporated community in Boon Township, Warrick County, in the U.S. state of Indiana.

== Geography ==
New Hope is located at 37°59′23″N 87°13′24″W.
