= Roberts-Morton House =

Historic house in Indiana, United States

- Roberts-Morton Old Stone House
- U.S. National Register of Historic Places
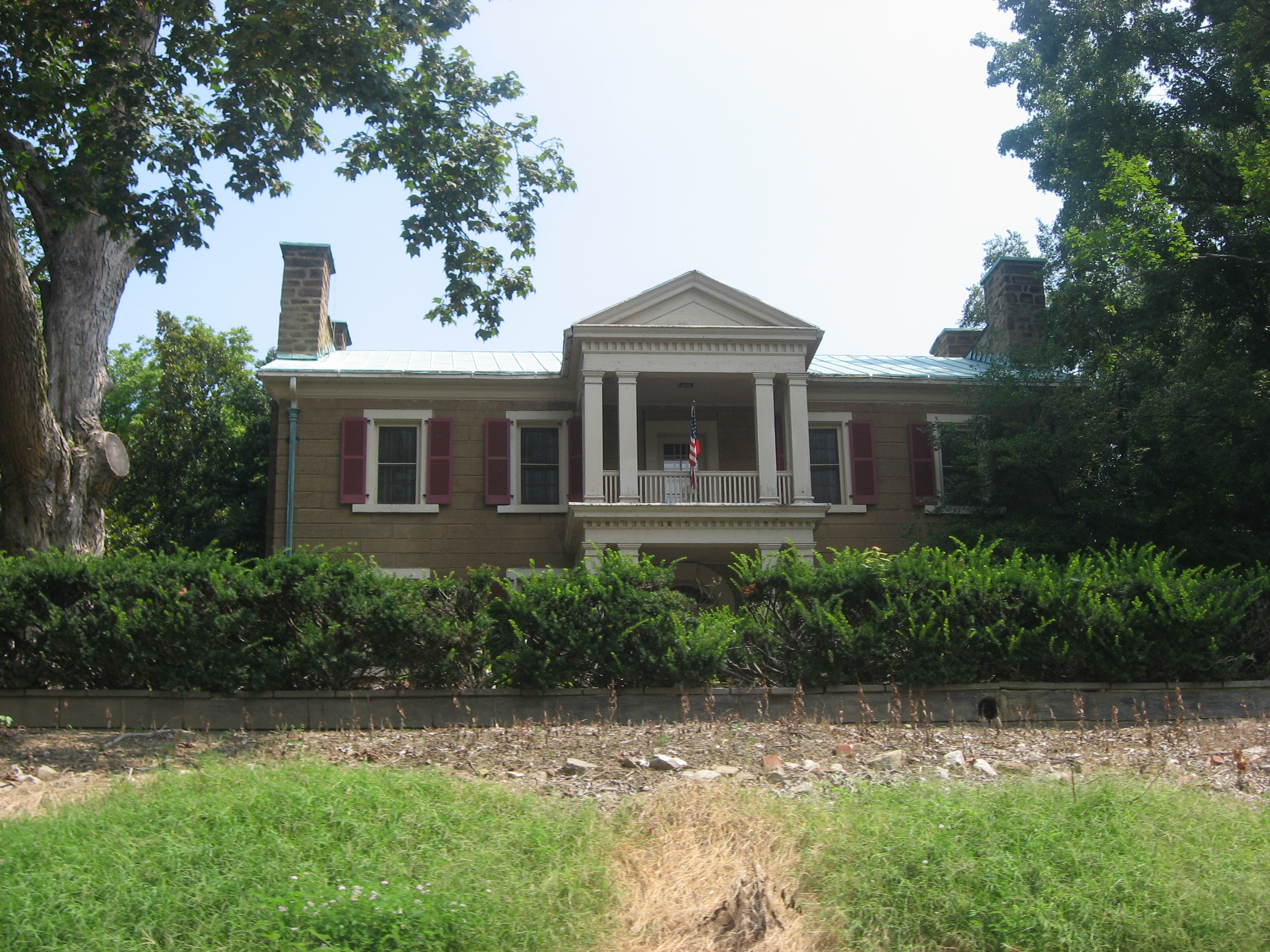
- Roberts-Morton House, July 2011

- Location within Indiana Location within the United States
- Nearest city: 1.5 miles east of Newburgh on State Road 662, Ohio Township, Warrick County, Indiana
- Coordinates: 37°56′26″N 87°23′23″W
- Area: 2 acres (0.81 ha)
- Built: 1833
- Architectural style: Federal, Greek Revival
- NRHP reference No.: 74000024
- Added to NRHP: December 16, 1974

Roberts-Morton House, also known as the Old Stone House, is a historic home located in Ohio Township, Warrick County, Indiana, United States. Just east of the town of Newburgh. It was built in 1833–1834, and is a two-story, rectangular, Federal style cut stone dwelling. It has a low gable roof and exterior end chimneys. The front facade features a two-story, Greek Revival style projecting portico.

It was listed on the National Register of Historic Places in 1974.

The house is currently a private residence. The homeowner wanted to try to keep the tile in the original design when he updated it. From a guy that did the tile in the house.
