= Folsomville, Indiana =

- Unincorporated community
- Location within Indiana Location within the United States
- Coordinates: 38°07′45″N 87°09′51″W
- Country: United States
- State: Indiana
- County: Warrick
- Township: Owen
- Elevation: 460 ft (140 m)
- Time zone: UTC-6 (Central (CST))
  - Summer (DST): UTC-5 (CDT)
- ZIP code: 47637
- Area codes: 812, 930
- FIPS code: 18-23836
- GNIS feature ID: 434629

Folsomville is an unincorporated community in Owen Township, Warrick County, in the U.S. state of Indiana.

== History ==
Folsomville was laid out in 1859 by Benjamin Folsom, and named for him. A post office has been in operation at Folsomville since 1863. Folsomville used to have the nickname "Lick Skillet."

== Geography ==
Folsomville is located at 38°07′45″N 87°09′51″W.

== Demographics ==
The United States Census Bureau first delineated Folsomville as a census designated place in the 2022 American Community Survey.
