= Boon Township, Warrick County, Indiana =

Boon Township Warrick County
- Township
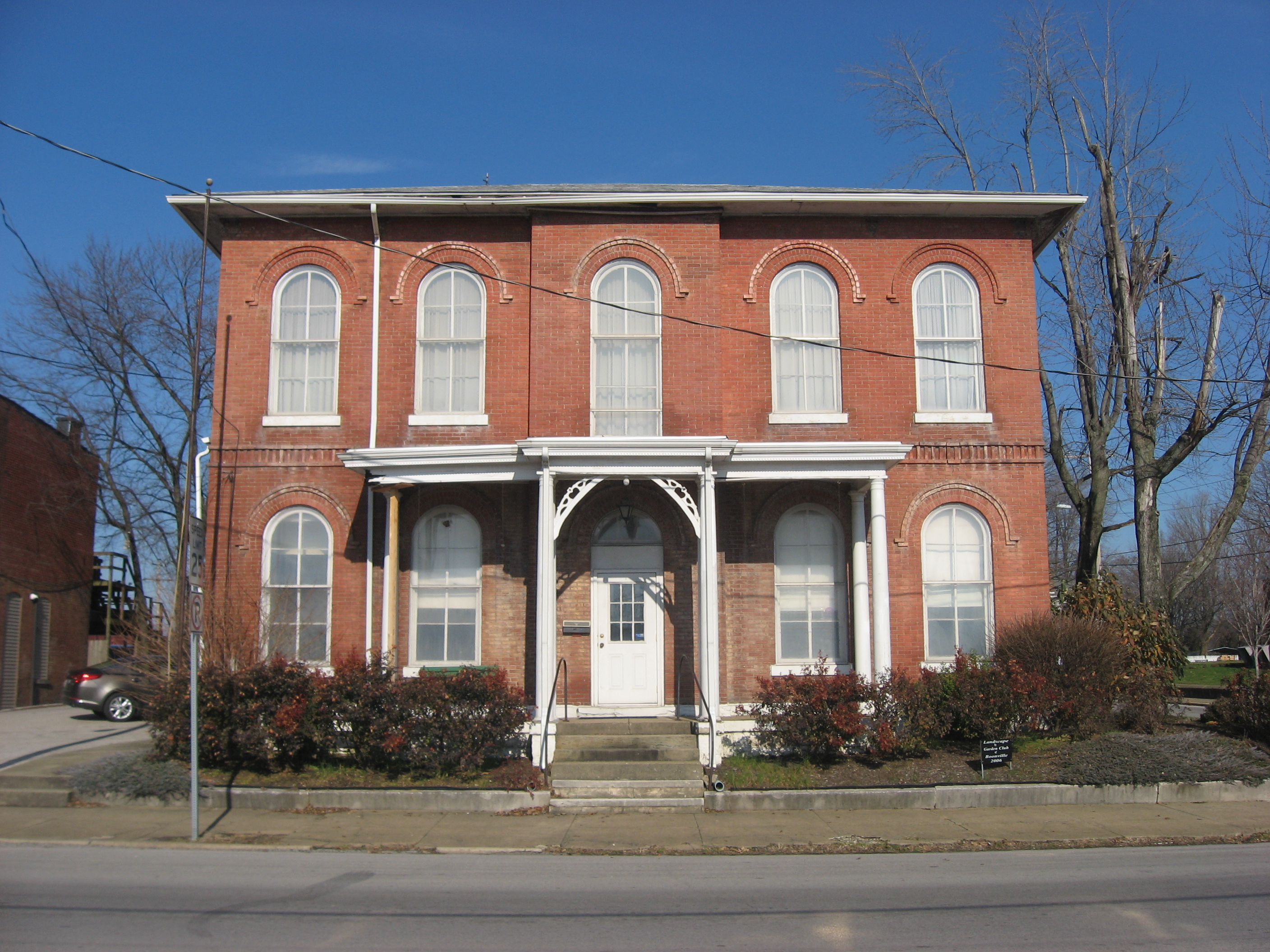
- Old Warrick County Jail, a historic place in Boonville

- Location in Warrick County
- Coordinates: 38°02′23″N 87°16′38″W
- Country: United States
- State: Indiana
- County: Warrick

Government
  - Type: Indiana township

Area
  - Total: 84.93 sq mi (220.0 km^{2})
  - Land: 83.45 sq mi (216.1 km^{2})
  - Water: 1.48 sq mi (3.8 km^{2}) 1.74%
- Elevation: 423 ft (129 m)

Population (2020)
  - Total: 13,583
  - Density: 152.8/sq mi (59.0/km^{2})
- ZIP codes: 47601, 47610, 47630
- GNIS feature ID: 453124
- Website: boontownship-in.com

Boon Township is one of ten townships in Warrick County, Indiana, United States. As of the 2010 census, its population was 12,755 and it contained 5,529 housing units.

== History ==
Boon Township was established in 1816 from land given by Anderson Township. It was named for settler Ratliff Boon.

== Geography ==
According to the 2010 census, the township has a total area of 84.93 square miles (220.0 km^{2}), of which 83.45 square miles (216.1 km^{2}) (or 98.26%) is land and 1.48 square miles (3.8 km^{2}) (or 1.74%) is water.

=== Cities, towns, villages ===
- Boonville (the county seat)
- Chandler (east edge)

=== Unincorporated towns ===
- Bullocktown at 37.974769°N 87.222781°W
- Center at 38.048656°N 87.343064°W
- New Hope at 37.989769°N 87.222503°W
- Pelzer at 37.989213°N 87.257226°W

(This list is based on USGS data and may include former settlements.)

=== Adjacent townships ===
- Hart Township (north)
- Owen Township (northeast)
- Grass Township, Spencer County (east)
- Skelton Township (east)
- Luce Township, Spencer County (southeast)
- Anderson Township (south)
- Campbell Township (west)
- Ohio Township (west)

=== Cemeteries ===
The township contains these cemeteries: Baker, Broshears, Brown Chapel, Clutter Stone, Ellis, Freedom (also known as Mundy Cemetery and Powers Cemetery), Hedge, Maple Grove, Perigo, Plainview Memorial, Small, Thornburg, Warren and Wesley Chapel.

=== Airports and landing strips ===
- Boonville Airport

=== Landmarks ===
- Scales Lake State Park

== School districts ==
- Warrick County School Corporation

== Political districts ==
- Indiana's 8th congressional district
- State House District 74
- State Senate District 47
