= Center, Warrick County, Indiana =

Center
- Unincorporated community
- Location within Indiana Location within the United States
- Coordinates: 38°02′55″N 87°20′35″W
- Country: United States
- State: Indiana
- County: Warrick
- Township: Boon
- Elevation: 443 ft (135 m)
- Time zone: UTC-6 (Central (CST))
  - Summer (DST): UTC-5 (CDT)
- ZIP code: 47601
- Area code: 812
- GNIS feature ID: 432308

Center is an unincorporated community in Boon Township, Warrick County, in the U.S. state of Indiana.
