= Wheatonville, Indiana =

- Unincorporated community
- Location within Indiana Location within the United States
- Coordinates: 38°11′14″N 87°27′41″W
- Country: United States
- State: Indiana
- County: Warrick
- Township: Greer
- Elevation: 433 ft (132 m)
- Time zone: UTC-6 (Central (CST))
  - Summer (DST): UTC-5 (CDT)
- ZIP code: 47613
- Area codes: 812, 930
- GNIS feature ID: 445880

Wheatonville is an unincorporated community in Greer Township, Warrick County, in the U.S. state of Indiana.

== History ==
A post office was established at Wheatonville in 1860, and remained in operation until it was discontinued in 1872.

== Geography ==
Wheatonville is located at 38°11′14″N 87°27′41″W.
