= Eby, Indiana =

- Unincorporated community
- Location within Indiana Location within the United States
- Coordinates: 38°08′31″N 87°15′41″W
- Country: United States
- State: Indiana
- County: Warrick
- Township: Hart
- Elevation: 489 ft (149 m)
- Time zone: UTC-6 (Central (CST))
  - Summer (DST): UTC-5 (CDT)
- ZIP code: 47601
- Area codes: 812, 930
- GNIS feature ID: 433988

Eby is an unincorporated community in Hart Township, Warrick County, in the U.S. state of Indiana.

== History ==
A post office was established at Eby in 1870, and remained in operation until it was discontinued in 1903. According to Ronald L. Baker, the community was probably named for a local resident. A Warrick County soldier named Abraham Eby was killed in the Civil War.

== Geography ==
Eby is located at 38°08′31″N 87°15′41″W.
