= Eames, Indiana =

- Unincorporated community
- Location within Indiana Location within the United States
- Coordinates: 38°04′45″N 87°07′54″W
- Country: United States
- State: Indiana
- County: Warrick
- Township: Skelton
- Elevation: 390 ft (119 m)
- Time zone: UTC-6 (Central (CST))
  - Summer (DST): UTC-5 (CDT)
- ZIP code: 47637
- Area codes: 812, 930
- GNIS feature ID: 433859

Eames is an unincorporated community in Skelton Township, Warrick County, in the U.S. state of Indiana.

== History ==
A post office was established at Eames in 1882, and remained in operation until it was discontinued in 1894.

== Geography ==
Eames is located at 38°04′45″N 87°07′54″W.
