= Graham Valley, Indiana =

- Unincorporated community
- Location within Indiana Location within the United States
- Coordinates: 38°09′00″N 87°17′27″W
- Country: United States
- State: Indiana
- County: Warrick
- Township: Hart
- Elevation: 460 ft (140 m)
- Time zone: UTC-6 (Central (CST))
  - Summer (DST): UTC-5 (CDT)
- ZIP code: 47601
- Area codes: 812, 930
- GNIS feature ID: 435291

Graham Valley is an unincorporated community in Hart Township, Warrick County, in the U.S. state of Indiana.

== Geography ==
Graham Valley is located at 38°09′00″N 87°17′27″W.
