= Pelzer, Indiana =

- Unincorporated community
- Location within Indiana Location within the United States
- Coordinates: 37°59′21″N 87°15′26″W
- Country: United States
- State: Indiana
- County: Warrick
- Township: Boon
- Elevation: 420 ft (128 m)
- Time zone: UTC-6 (Central (CST))
  - Summer (DST): UTC-5 (CDT)
- ZIP code: 47601
- Area codes: 812, 930
- GNIS feature ID: 440986

Pelzer is an unincorporated community in Boon Township, Warrick County, in the U.S. state of Indiana.

== History ==
A post office was established at Pelzer in 1898, and remained in operation until 1900. The community bears the name of a family of settlers. Frederick William Pelzer, a local Warrick County farmer, immigrated from Germany in 1860.

== Geography ==
Pelzer is located at 37°59′21″N 87°15′26″W.
