= Heilman, Indiana =

- Unincorporated community
- Location within Indiana Location within the United States
- Coordinates: 38°09′27″N 87°05′25″W
- Country: United States
- State: Indiana
- County: Warrick
- Township: Pigeon
- Elevation: 489 ft (149 m)
- Time zone: UTC-6 (Central (CST))
  - Summer (DST): UTC-5 (CDT)
- ZIP code: 47523
- Area codes: 812, 930
- GNIS feature ID: 435983

Heilman is an unincorporated community in Pigeon Township, Warrick County, in the U.S. state of Indiana.

== History ==
A post office was established at Heilman in 1881, and remained in operation until 1903. Heilman was named after a local family of settlers.

== Geography ==
Heilman is located at 38°09′27″N 87°05′25″W.
