= Bullocktown, Indiana =

- Unincorporated community
- Location within Indiana Location within the United States
- Coordinates: 37°58′29″N 87°13′22″W
- Country: United States
- State: Indiana
- County: Warrick
- Township: Boon
- Elevation: 381 ft (116 m)
- Time zone: UTC-6 (Central (CST))
  - Summer (DST): UTC-5 (CDT)
- ZIP code: 47601
- Area codes: 812, 930
- GNIS feature ID: 431797

Bullocktown is an unincorporated community in Boon Township, Warrick County, in the U.S. state of Indiana.

== History ==
An old variant name of the community was Bullock. A post office was established under the name Bullock in 1892, and remained in operation until 1903. John A. Bullock served as an early postmaster, and gave the community his name.
