= Dickeyville, Indiana =

- Unincorporated community
- Location within Indiana Location within the United States
- Coordinates: 38°09′23″N 87°13′14″W
- Country: United States
- State: Indiana
- County: Warrick
- Township: Owen
- Elevation: 486 ft (148 m)
- Time zone: UTC-6 (Central (CST))
  - Summer (DST): UTC-5 (CDT)
- ZIP code: 47601
- Area codes: 812, 930
- GNIS feature ID: 433540

Dickeyville is an abandoned unincorporated community in Owen Township, Warrick County, in the U.S. state of Indiana.

== History ==
The date of Dickeyville's founding is uncertain, but it had a post office established in 1884, remaining until 1903. The community was named after the Dickey family of settlers. At one time the town had "a grist mill, two saloons, two stores, [a] blacksmith shop...and a school." One of the businesses reportedly kept lions in captivity one winter.

The community lay atop one of the richest coal seams in Indiana, and the Sunlight Coal Company began strip mining the area in 1940. The town's last business closed in 1950 after most residents had left and most infrastructure had been "buried." By 1981, nothing remained at the town site except a few foundations and some beech trees with carvings in the trunks.
