= Greer Township, Warrick County, Indiana =

Greer Township Warrick County
- Township
- Location in Warrick County
- Coordinates: 38°10′24″N 87°24′45″W
- Country: United States
- State: Indiana
- County: Warrick

Government
  - Type: Indiana township

Area
  - Total: 27.54 sq mi (71.3 km^{2})
  - Land: 27.17 sq mi (70.4 km^{2})
  - Water: 0.37 sq mi (0.96 km^{2}) 1.34%
- Elevation: 390 ft (120 m)

Population (2020)
  - Total: 1,848
  - Density: 69.3/sq mi (26.8/km^{2})
- ZIP codes: 47613, 47619, 47639
- GNIS feature ID: 453356

Greer Township is one of ten townships in Warrick County, Indiana, United States. As of the 2010 census, its population was 1,883 and it contained 769 housing units.

== History ==
Greer Township was organized in 1853. The township was named for Richard Greer, a pioneer settler.

== Geography ==
According to the 2010 census, the township has a total area of 27.54 square miles (71.3 km^{2}), of which 27.17 square miles (70.4 km^{2}) (or 98.66%) is land and 0.37 square miles (0.96 km^{2}) (or 1.34%) is water.

=== Cities, towns, villages ===
- Elberfeld

=== Unincorporated towns ===
- Wheatonville at 38.187267°N 87.461405°W

(This list is based on USGS data and may include former settlements.)

=== Adjacent townships ===
- Barton Township, Gibson County (north)
- Hart Township (east)
- Campbell Township (south)
- Johnson Township, Gibson County (west)
- Scott Township, Vanderburgh County (west)

=== Cemeteries ===
The township contains these four cemeteries: Northview, Susott, Williams and Zion.

== School districts ==
- Warrick County School Corporation

== Political districts ==
- Indiana's 8th congressional district
- State House District 75
- State Senate District 50
