= Camp Brosend =

Camp Brosend, Indiana
- Unincorporated community
- Location within Indiana Location within the United States
- Coordinates: 37°57′52″N 87°23′45″W
- Country: United States
- State: Indiana
- County: Warrick
- Township: Ohio
- Elevation: 443 ft (135 m)
- Time zone: UTC-6 (Central (CST))
  - Summer (DST): UTC-5 (CDT)
- ZIP code: 47630
- Area codes: 812, 930
- GNIS feature ID: 432012

Camp Brosend is a church and youth camp in Warrick County, Indiana.

== History ==
Founded in 1949, camp construction was largely finished by 1953, under the supervision of a General Baptist minister and his wife, who donated 20 acres of land for the site. By 1984, the camp was under the operation of Ken Nelson, but was still affiliated with the General Baptists. At that time, it had a size of 40 acres, and while it served religious uses, it primarily functioned as a youth camp. In the early 2010s, the campsite hosted archery camps. As of 2022, the camp is still operational with a religious focus and a relationship with the General Baptists.

== Geography ==
Camp Brosend is located at 37°57′52″N 87°23′45″W.
