= Vanada, Indiana =

- Unincorporated community
- Location within Indiana Location within the United States
- Coordinates: 37°55′56″N 87°21′52″W
- Country: United States
- State: Indiana
- County: Warrick
- Township: Anderson
- Elevation: 384 ft (117 m)
- Time zone: UTC-6 (Central (CST))
  - Summer (DST): UTC-5 (CDT)
- ZIP code: 47630
- Area codes: 812, 930
- GNIS feature ID: 445220

Vanada is an unincorporated community in Anderson Township, Warrick County, in the U.S. state of Indiana.

== History ==
Solomon Vanada built the first watermill in the county on nearby Cypress Creek in 1818.

== Geography ==
Vanada is located at 37°55′56″N 87°21′52″W.
