= Jacob Warrick =

Jacob Warrick (1773–November 7, 1811) was an early settler of Indiana and a militia officer.

Warrick was born on the then frontier at Warrick's Station, in the present-day Greenbrier County, West Virginia. He was a son of John Warrick, who had served at the 1774 Battle of Point Pleasant, during Lord Dunmore's War against the Native Americans. As a young man, Jacob Warrick moved to what is now Nicholas County, Kentucky.

In 1795 he married Jane Montgomery, a daughter of Thomas Montgomery, who had settled in today's Montgomery County, Kentucky in 1793.

The Montgomery family moved to Indiana Territory in 1805, and Jacob Warrick joined them the following year. In 1807 Warrick and Thomas Montgomery led the militiamen that burned the last Native American village in Gibson County, pursuing the fleeing Indians into Illinois.

As a militia captain, Jacob Warrick commanded an Indiana company during Tecumseh's War. He was killed in 1811 at the Battle of Tippecanoe. His widow survived him by 35 years.

Warrick County, Indiana is named for Jacob Warrick.
