= Stevenson, Indiana =

- Unincorporated community
- Location within Indiana Location within the United States
- Coordinates: 38°00′35″N 87°26′11″W
- Country: United States
- State: Indiana
- County: Warrick
- Township: Ohio
- Elevation: 384 ft (117 m)
- Time zone: UTC-6 (Central (CST))
  - Summer (DST): UTC-5 (CDT)
- ZIP code: 47610
- Area codes: 812, 930
- GNIS feature ID: 444139

Stevenson is an unincorporated community in Ohio Township, Warrick County, in the U.S. state of Indiana.

== History ==
Stevenson was first known as Armery, and under the latter name was platted in 1886.

A post office was established at Stevenson in 1890, and remained in operation until it was discontinued in 1904.
