= Elberfeld, Indiana =

- Town
- Town of Elberfeld
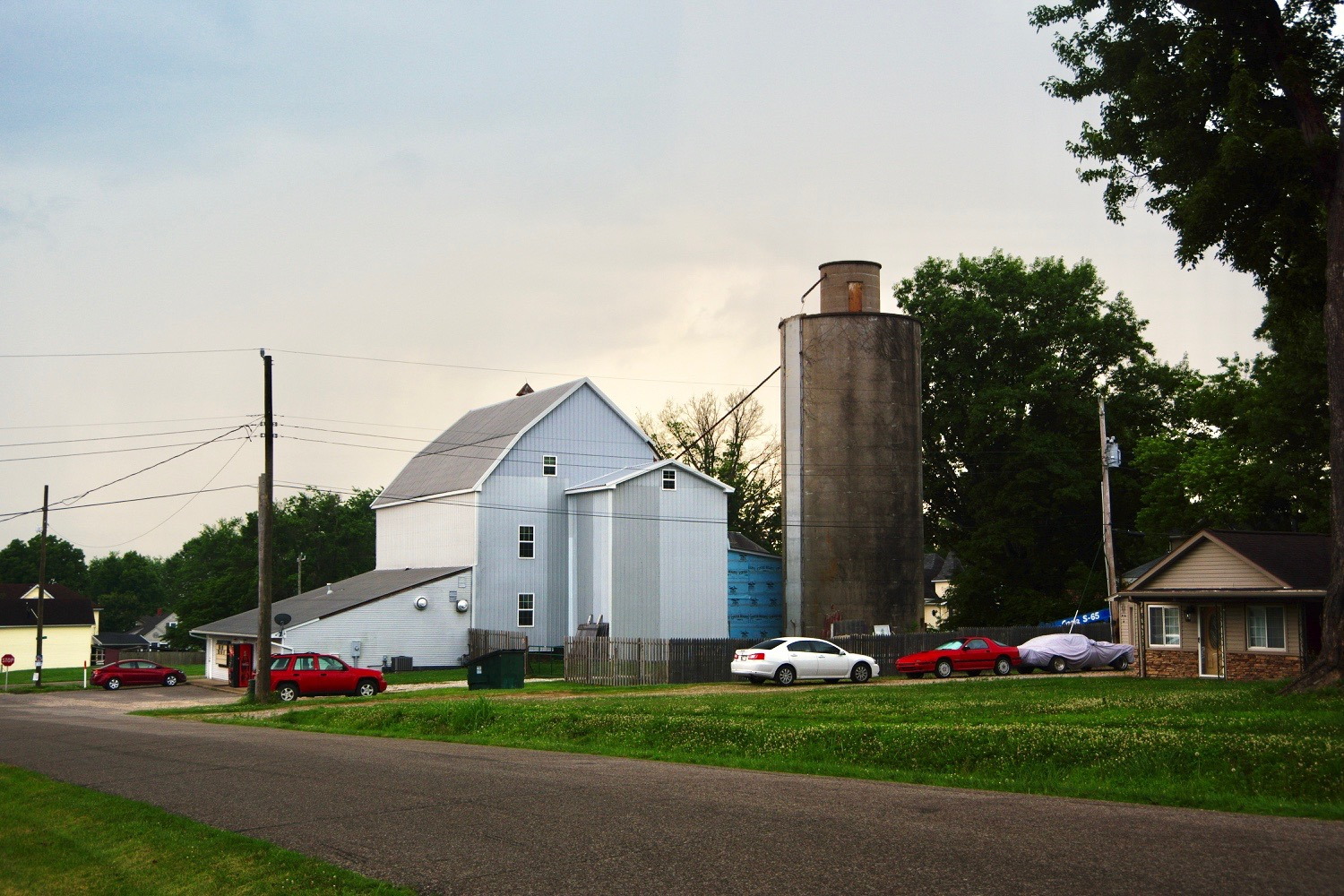
- Schultz Mill in Elberfeld

- Location of Elberfeld in Warrick County, Indiana.
- Coordinates: 38°09′42″N 87°26′53″W
- Country: United States
- State: Indiana
- County: Warrick
- Township: Greer

Area
  - Total: 0.31 sq mi (0.79 km^{2})
  - Land: 0.31 sq mi (0.79 km^{2})
  - Water: 0 sq mi (0.00 km^{2})
- Elevation: 479 ft (146 m)

Population (2020)
  - Total: 644
  - Density: 2,105.1/sq mi (812.79/km^{2})
- Time zone: UTC-6 (CST)
  - Summer (DST): UTC-5 (CDT)
- ZIP code: 47613
- Area code: 812
- FIPS code: 18-20638
- GNIS feature ID: 2396923

Elberfeld is a town in Greer Township, Warrick County, in the U.S. state of Indiana. The population was 644 as of the 2020 census.

Elberfeld is one of a very few towns in Indiana of its size not to have any kind of main highway running through it or direct access to a major highway. Interstate 64 runs just north of the municipal boundary, but it has no exit linking to the town. Interstate 69 passes just west of the community, but it, too, lacks a direct access point, residents having to backtrack along two roads to reach the Indiana 57 interchange with the interstate. The nearest state road is Indiana 68, 2.5 miles north of town. The two interstates intersect roughly 2 miles northwest of the town in nearby Gibson County. The town is bisected by the Indiana Southern Railroad track.

== History ==
A post office has been in operation at Elberfeld since 1868. The town was originally built up chiefly by Germans, who named their community after Elberfeld, in Germany. Elberfeld was officially platted in 1885.

== Geography ==
The town lies northeast of Evansville in the northwest corner of Warrick County.

According to the 2010 census, Elberfeld has a total area of 0.31 square miles (0.80 km^{2}), all land.

== Demographics ==
Historical population
Census	Pop.	Note	%±
1910	438		—
1920	473		8.0%
1930	546		15.4%
1940	520		−4.8%
1950	499		−4.0%
1960	485		−2.8%
1970	834		72.0%
1980	640		−23.3%
1990	635		−0.8%
2000	636		0.2%
2010	625		−1.7%
2020	644		3.0%
U.S. Decennial Census

=== 2010 census ===
As of the census of 2010, there were 625 people, 251 households, and 186 families residing in the town. The population density was 2,016.1 inhabitants per square mile (778.4/km^{2}). There were 275 housing units at an average density of 887.1 per square mile (342.5/km^{2}). The racial makeup of the town was 97.3% White, 0.2% African American, 1.0% Native American, and 1.6% from two or more races. Hispanic or Latino of any race were 1.3% of the population.

There were 251 households, of which 36.7% had children under the age of 18 living with them, 59.8% were married couples living together, 12.4% had a female householder with no husband present, 2.0% had a male householder with no wife present, and 25.9% were non-families. 23.1% of all households were made up of individuals, and 10% had someone living alone who was 65 years of age or older. The average household size was 2.49 and the average family size was 2.91.

The median age in the town was 38.3 years. 25.1% of residents were under the age of 18; 5.5% were between the ages of 18 and 24; 28.8% were from 25 to 44; 25.4% were from 45 to 64; and 15.2% were 65 years of age or older. The gender makeup of the town was 50.1% male and 49.9% female.

=== 2000 census ===
As of the census of 2000, there were 636 people, 261 households, and 192 families residing in the town. The population density was 2,050.7 inhabitants per square mile (791.8/km^{2}). There were 271 housing units at an average density of 873.8 per square mile (337.4/km^{2}). The racial makeup of the town was 99.69% White, 0.16% Asian and 0.16% Pacific Islander. Hispanic or Latino of any race were 0.31% of the population.

There were 261 households, out of which 28.0% had children under the age of 18 living with them, 61.7% were married couples living together, 9.6% had a female householder with no husband present, and 26.4% were non-families. 23.0% of all households were made up of individuals, and 11.1% had someone living alone who was 65 years of age or older. The average household size was 2.44 and the average family size was 2.88.

In the town, the population was spread out, with 21.9% under the age of 18, 9.0% from 18 to 24, 28.0% from 25 to 44, 28.0% from 45 to 64, and 13.2% who were 65 years of age or older. The median age was 40 years. For every 100 females, there were 98.8 males. For every 100 females age 18 and over, there were 94.1 males.

The median income for a household in the town was $40,833, and the median income for a family was $47,292. Males had a median income of $38,250 versus $21,063 for females. The per capita income for the town was $19,236. About 4.3% of families and 4.2% of the population were below the poverty line, including 3.2% of those under age 18 and none of those age 65 or over.

== Education ==
Elberfeld has a public library, a branch of the Boonville-Warrick County Public Library. Elberfeld has a school district and is served by Elberfeld Elementary School.

== Notable people ==
- Bob Lochmueller, former NBA player, college & high school basketball coach
