= Lynnville, Indiana =

- Town
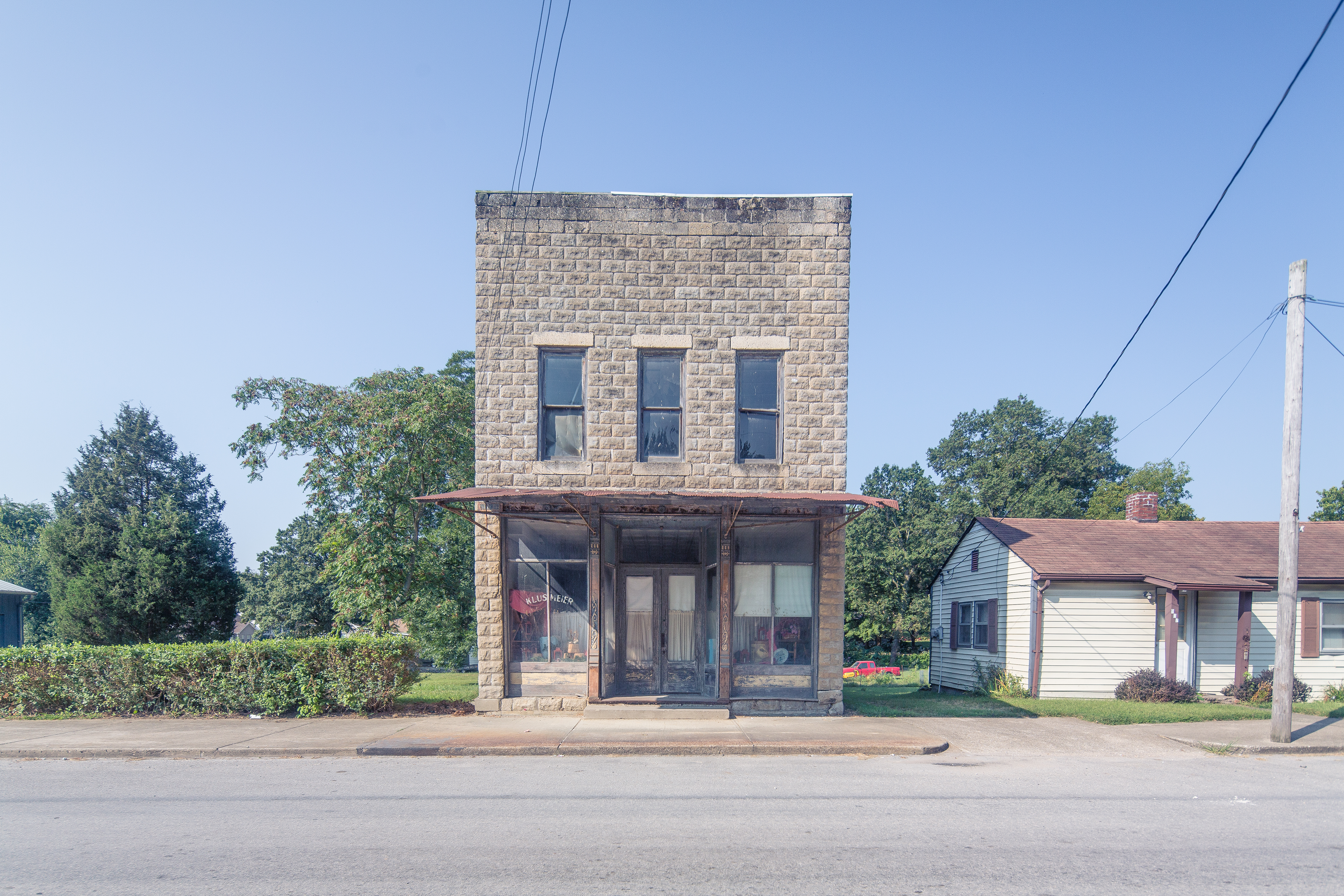

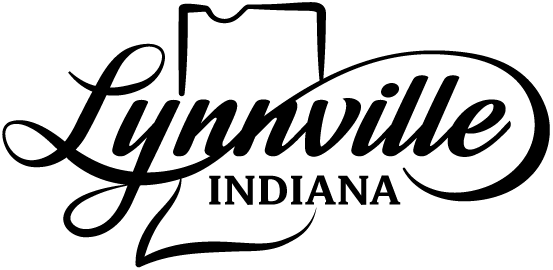
- Logo

- Location of Lynnville in Warrick County, Indiana.
- Coordinates: 38°11′59″N 87°18′41″W
- Country: United States
- State: Indiana
- County: Warrick
- Township: Hart

Area
  - Total: 1.98 sq mi (5.12 km^{2})
  - Land: 1.74 sq mi (4.51 km^{2})
  - Water: 0.24 sq mi (0.61 km^{2})
- Elevation: 476 ft (145 m)

Population (2020)
  - Total: 830
  - Density: 476.4/sq mi (183.95/km^{2})
- Time zone: UTC-6 (Central (CST))
  - Summer (DST): UTC-5 (CDT)
- ZIP code: 47619
- Area code: 812
- FIPS code: 18-45486
- GNIS feature ID: 2396730
- Website: townoflynnville.com

Lynnville is a town in Hart Township, Warrick County, in the U.S. state of Indiana. The population was 830 at the 2020 census.

== History ==
Lynnville was platted in 1839. The town was named for its founder, John Lynn, who also established the first store at the site. A post office has been in operation at Lynnville since 1839.

== Geography ==
Lynnville is located at 38°11′59″N 87°18′41″W.

According to the 2010 census, Lynnville has a total area of 1.98 square miles (5.13 km^{2}), of which 1.74 square miles (4.51 km^{2}) (or 87.88%) is land and 0.24 square miles (0.62 km^{2}) (or 12.12%) is water.

== Demographics ==
Historical population
Census	Pop.	Note	%±
1880	304		—
1910	297		—
1920	412		38.7%
1930	264		−35.9%
1940	371		40.5%
1950	404		8.9%
1960	409		1.2%
1970	556		35.9%
1980	566		1.8%
1990	640		13.1%
2000	781		22.0%
2010	888		13.7%
2020	830		−6.5%
U.S. Decennial Census

=== 2010 census ===
As of the census of 2010, there were 888 people, 352 households, and 239 families living in the town. The population density was 510.3 inhabitants per square mile (197.0/km^{2}). There were 396 housing units at an average density of 227.6 per square mile (87.9/km^{2}). The racial makeup of the town was 98.9% White, 0.1% African American, 0.2% Native American, and 0.8% from two or more races. Hispanic or Latino of any race were 0.8% of the population.

There were 352 households, of which 33.8% had children under the age of 18 living with them, 51.4% were married couples living together, 9.7% had a female householder with no husband present, 6.8% had a male householder with no wife present, and 32.1% were non-families. 26.7% of all households were made up of individuals, and 9.9% had someone living alone who was 65 years of age or older. The average household size was 2.50 and the average family size was 3.03.

The median age in the town was 38.9 years. 24.5% of residents were under the age of 18; 7.1% were between the ages of 18 and 24; 27.4% were from 25 to 44; 27.9% were from 45 to 64; and 13.2% were 65 years of age or older. The gender makeup of the town was 52.0% male and 48.0% female.

=== 2000 census ===
As of the census of 2000, there were 781 people, 346 households, and 226 families living in the town. The population density was 457.5 inhabitants per square mile (176.6/km^{2}). There were 384 housing units at an average density of 224.9 per square mile (86.8/km^{2}). The racial makeup of the town was 98.85% White, 0.13% Asian, 0.13% Pacific Islander, and 0.90% from two or more races.

There were 346 households, out of which 26.9% had children under the age of 18 living with them, 55.8% were married couples living together, 7.5% had a female householder with no husband present, and 34.4% were non-families. 28.9% of all households were made up of individuals, and 13.0% had someone living alone who was 65 years of age or older. The average household size was 2.26 and the average family size was 2.78.

In the town, the population was spread out, with 21.1% under the age of 18, 7.8% from 18 to 24, 28.8% from 25 to 44, 29.4% from 45 to 64, and 12.8% who were 65 years of age or older. The median age was 39 years. For every 100 females, there were 99.7 males. For every 100 females age 18 and over, there were 93.7 males.

The median income for a household in the town was $35,556, and the median income for a family was $41,964. Males had a median income of $36,518 versus $22,250 for females. The per capita income for the town was $16,288. About 5.3% of families and 8.0% of the population were below the poverty line, including 8.5% of those under age 18 and 5.1% of those age 65 or over.

== Education ==
Lynnville has a public library, a branch of the Boonville-Warrick County Public Library.

Lynnville has an elementary, middle and high school (Tecumseh Junior – Senior High School).
