= Paradise, Indiana =

- Unincorporated community
- Location within Indiana Location within the United States
- Coordinates: 37°59′44″N 87°22′46″W
- Country: United States
- State: Indiana
- County: Warrick
- Township: Ohio
- Elevation: 460 ft (140 m)
- Time zone: UTC-6 (Central (CST))
  - Summer (DST): UTC-5 (CDT)
- ZIP code: 47630
- Area codes: 812, 930
- GNIS feature ID: 440858

Paradise is an unincorporated community in Ohio Township, Warrick County, in the U.S. state of Indiana. It is located north of Newburgh in the center portion of the township. Mail for this community is addressed to Newburgh, Indiana using the 47630 zip code.

== History ==
A post office was established at Paradise in 1891, and remained in operation until it was discontinued in 1902. The founders believed Paradise would make an ideal mining community, hence the commendatory name.

== Geography ==
Paradise is located at 37°59′44″N 87°22′46″W.
