= Ohio Township, Warrick County, Indiana =

Township in the United States

Ohio Township Warrick County
- Township
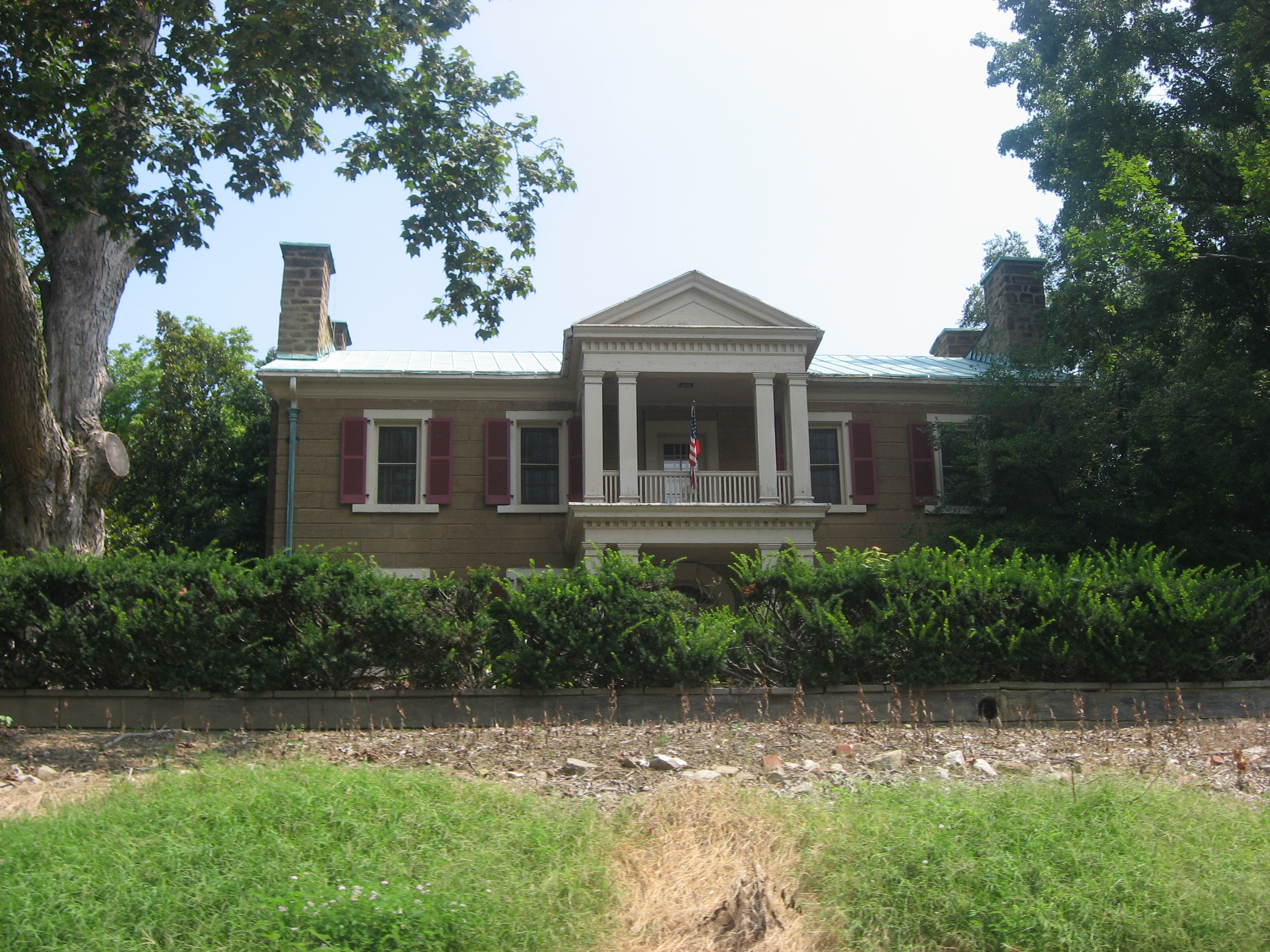
- The Roberts-Morton House, a historic place in Ohio Township

- Location in Warrick County
- Coordinates: 37°59′36″N 87°23′31″W
- Country: United States
- State: Indiana
- County: Warrick

Government
  - Type: Indiana township

Area
  - Total: 44.37 sq mi (114.9 km^{2})
  - Land: 44.14 sq mi (114.3 km^{2})
  - Water: 0.23 sq mi (0.60 km^{2}) 0.52%
- Elevation: 430 ft (131 m)

Population (2020)
  - Total: 41,238
  - Density: 855.3/sq mi (330.2/km^{2})
- ZIP codes: 47601, 47610, 47630
- GNIS feature ID: 453685
- Website: ohiotownship-in.com

Ohio Township is one of ten townships in Warrick County, Indiana, United States. As of the 2010 census, its population was 37,749 and it contained 14,922 housing units. It contains 63% of Warrick County's population. It has the third largest township population in Southwestern Indiana, behind two townships in Vanderburgh County and is one of the fastest-growing townships in Indiana. Ohio Township population grew 21.8% from the 2000 census to the 2010 census. Unlike most townships in Indiana, Ohio Township has two incorporated towns within its jurisdiction, Newburgh and Chandler.

== History ==
Ohio Township was organized in 1826. The township derives its name from the Ohio River, which forms its southern border.

The Angel Mounds, Ellerbusch site, and Roberts-Morton House are listed on the National Register of Historic Places.

== Geography ==
According to the 2010 census, the township has a total area of 44.37 square miles (114.9 km^{2}), of which 44.14 square miles (114.3 km^{2}) (or 99.48%) is land and 0.23 square miles (0.60 km^{2}) (or 0.52%) is water.

=== Cities, towns, villages ===
- Chandler (All but the far east end)
- Newburgh

=== Unincorporated towns ===
- Camp Brosend at 37.964488°N 87.395842°W
- Hillcrest Terrace at 37.948933°N 87.396397°W
- Paradise at 37.9956°N 87.379453°W
- Stevenson at 38.01671°N 87.433345°W

(This list is based on USGS data and may include former settlements.)

=== Adjacent townships ===
- Campbell Township (north)
- Boon Township (east)
- Anderson Township (southeast)
- Knight Township, Vanderburgh County (west)

=== Cemeteries ===
The township contains these four cemeteries: Casey, Greenwood, Hedge and Rose Hill.

=== Lakes ===
- Allens Lake
- Chase Lake
- Pfafflin Lake

== School districts ==
- Warrick County School Corporation

== Political districts ==
- Indiana's 8th congressional district
- State House District 75
- State House District 77
- State House District 78
- State Senate District 50
