= Fisherville, Indiana =

- Unincorporated community
- Location within Indiana Location within the United States
- Coordinates: 38°05′07″N 87°26′26″W
- Country: United States
- State: Indiana
- County: Warrick
- Township: Campbell
- Elevation: 443 ft (135 m)
- Time zone: UTC-6 (Central (CST))
  - Summer (DST): UTC-5 (CDT)
- ZIP code: 47613
- Area codes: 812, 930
- GNIS feature ID: 434528

Fisherville is an unincorporated community in Campbell Township, Warrick County, in the U.S. state of Indiana.

== Geography ==
Fisherville is located at 38°05′07″N 87°26′26″W.
