= Selvin, Indiana =

- Unincorporated community
- Location within Indiana Location within the United States
- Coordinates: 38°12′15″N 87°06′22″W
- Country: United States
- State: Indiana
- County: Warrick
- Township: Pigeon
- Elevation: 518 ft (158 m)
- Time zone: UTC-6 (Central (CST))
  - Summer (DST): UTC-5 (CDT)
- ZIP code: 47523
- Area codes: 812, 930
- FIPS code: 18-68724
- GNIS feature ID: 443215

Selvin is an unincorporated community in Pigeon Township, Warrick County, in the U.S. state of Indiana.

== History ==
Selvin was originally called Taylorsville, and under the latter name was laid out and platted in 1839 by George Taylor, and named for him. The post office in the community was first called Polk Patch. This post office was established in 1853, the name was changed to Selvin in 1881, and the post office closed in 1951.

== Geography ==
Selvin is located at 38°12′15″N 87°06′22″W.
