= De Gonia Springs, Indiana =

De Gonia Springs
- Unincorporated community
- Location within Indiana Location within the United States
- Coordinates: 38°03′16″N 87°11′10″W
- Country: United States
- State: Indiana
- County: Warrick
- Township: Skelton
- Elevation: 426 ft (130 m)
- Time zone: UTC-6 (Central (CST))
  - Summer (DST): UTC-5 (CDT)
- ZIP code: 47601
- Area code: 812
- GNIS feature ID: 433380

De Gonia Springs is an unincorporated community in Skelton Township, Warrick County, in the U.S. state of Indiana.

== History ==
A post office was established at De Gonia Springs in 1879, and remained in operation until 1926. The waters of the nearby spring were once believed to hold medicinal qualities.

== Geography ==
De Gonia Springs is located at 38°03′16″N 87°11′10″W.
