= Yankeetown, Indiana =

- Unincorporated community
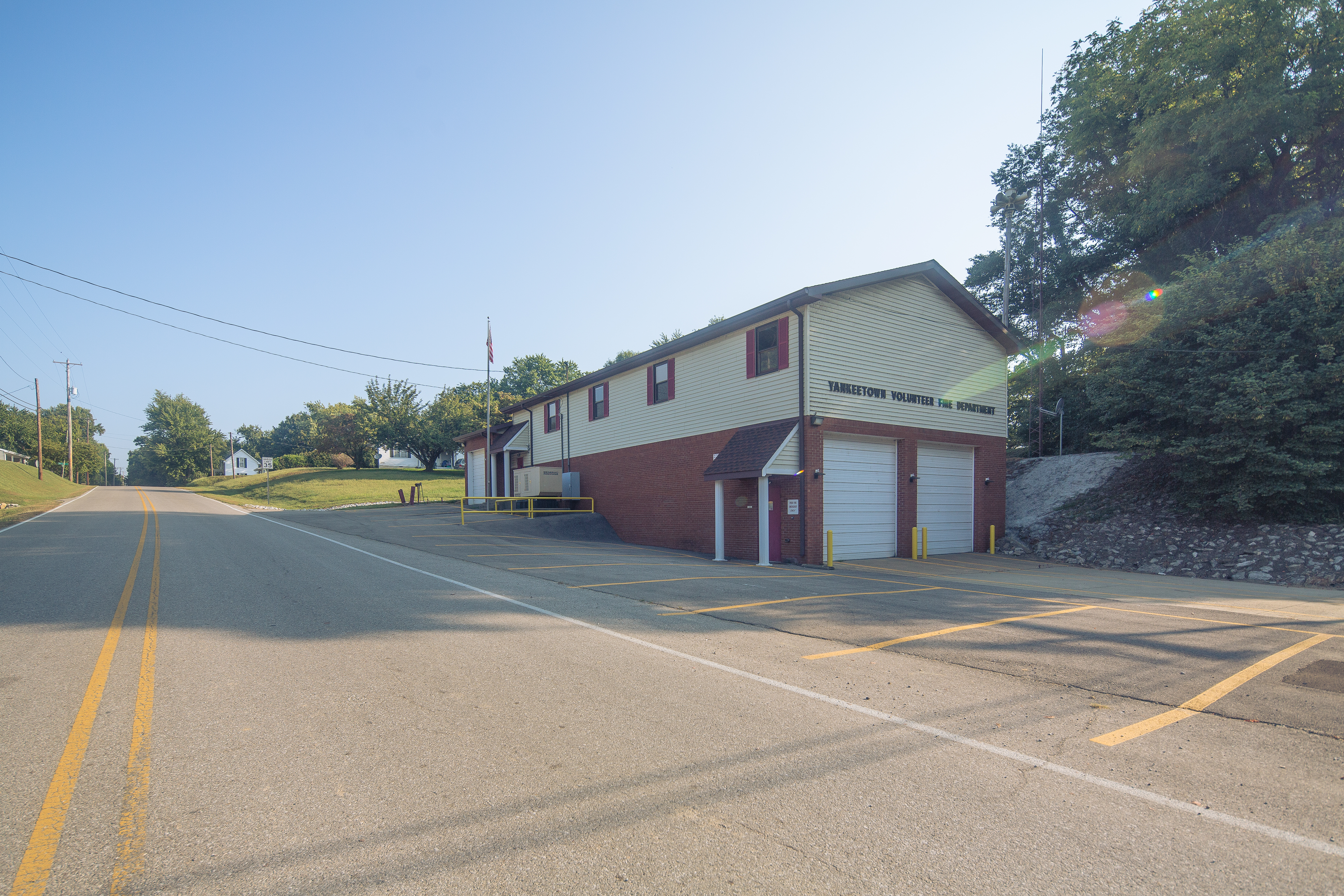

- Location within Indiana Location within the United States
- Coordinates: 37°55′03″N 87°17′52″W
- Country: United States
- State: Indiana
- County: Warrick
- Township: Anderson
- Elevation: 449 ft (137 m)
- Time zone: UTC-6 (Central (CST))
  - Summer (DST): UTC-5 (CDT)
- ZIP code: 47630
- Area codes: 812, 930
- FIPS code: 18-85760
- GNIS feature ID: 446363

Yankeetown is an unincorporated community in Anderson Township, Warrick County, in the U.S. state of Indiana.

== History ==
A post office was established at Yankeetown in 1853, and remained in operation until 1911. The community was officially laid out in 1858, and was so named for the fact the first settlers were Yankees.
