= Tucker, Missouri =

Extinct town in the U.S. state of Missouri

Coordinates: 36.761722°N 90.936793°W

Tucker is an extinct town in southwestern Ripley County, in the U.S. state of Missouri. The GNIS classifies it as a populated place. The community lies on Missouri Route Z, south of Gatewood and three miles north of the Missouri-Arkansas border.

A post office called Tucker was established in 1891, and remained in operation until 1907. The community has the name of John Tucker, a local merchant. A variant name was "Tuckertown".
