= Tennyson, Indiana =

- Town
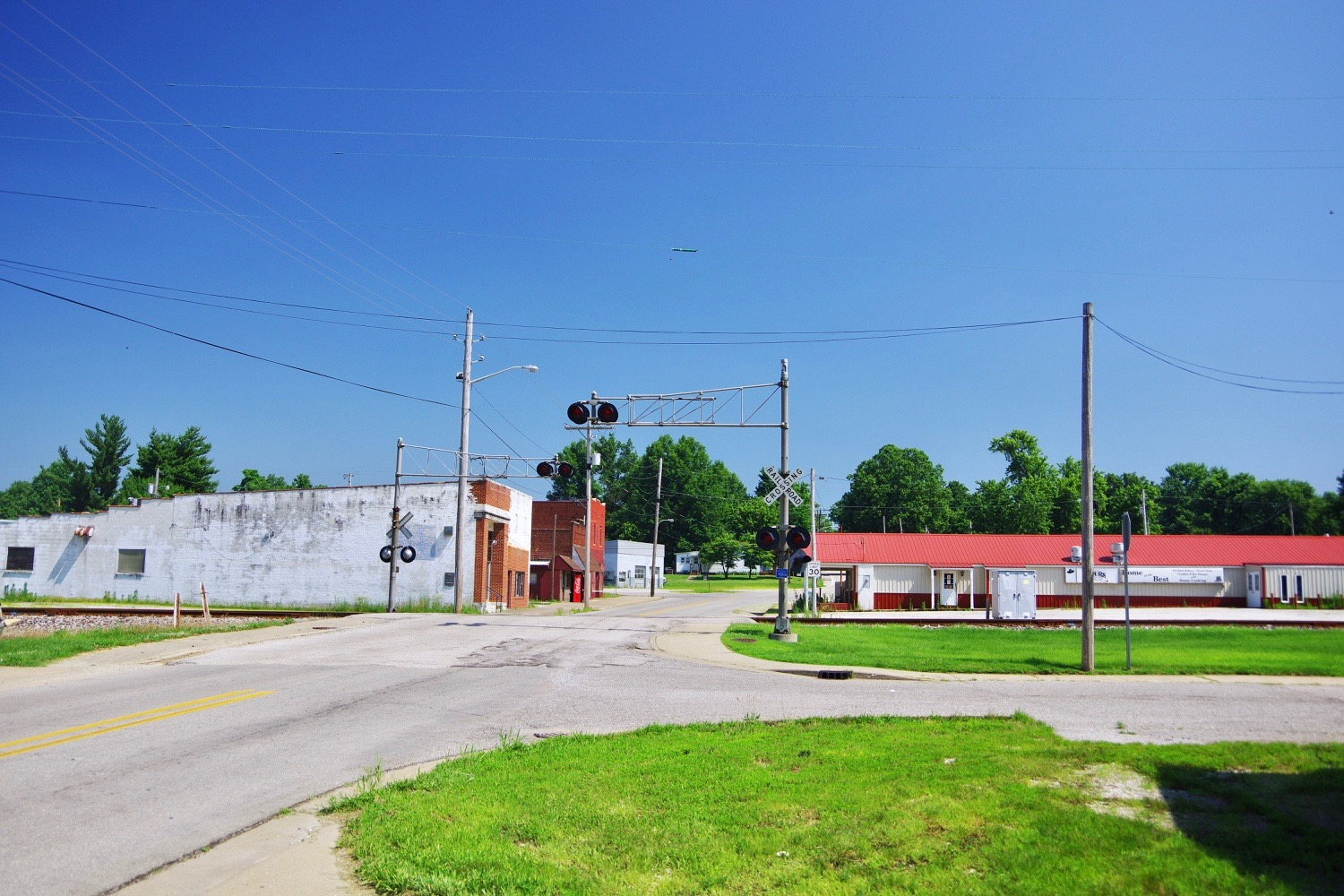
- Main Street (SR 161)

- Location of Tennyson in Warrick County, Indiana.
- Coordinates: 38°4′54″N 87°7′8″W
- Country: United States
- State: Indiana
- County: Warrick
- Township: Skelton

Area
  - Total: 0.24 sq mi (0.61 km^{2})
  - Land: 0.24 sq mi (0.61 km^{2})
  - Water: 0 sq mi (0.00 km^{2})
- Elevation: 404 ft (123 m)

Population (2020)
  - Total: 213
  - Density: 911.0/sq mi (351.72/km^{2})
- Time zone: UTC-6 (Central (CST))
  - Summer (DST): UTC-5 (CDT)
- ZIP code: 47637
- Area code: 812
- FIPS code: 18-75302
- GNIS feature ID: 2397694
- Website: townoftennyson.com

Tennyson is a town in Skelton Township, Warrick County, in the U.S. state of Indiana. The population was 213 at the 2020 census.

== History ==
A post office has been in operation at Tennyson since 1881. A town plat was made in about 1882. The town was named after George Martin Van Buren Tennyson.

== Geography ==
Tennyson is located at 38°4′54″N 87°7′8″W (38.081673, -87.118946). The town lies in eastern Warrick County, northeast of Boonville, the county seat. Indiana State Road 161 (signed as Main Street) traverses the town from north to south. Little Pigeon Creek and its associated state wetland conservation area lies just east of Tennyson.

According to the 2010 census, Tennyson has a total area of 0.23 square miles (0.60 km^{2}), all land.

== Demographics ==
Historical population
Census	Pop.	Note	%±
1900	302		—
1910	371		22.8%
1920	386		4.0%
1930	335		−13.2%
1940	293		−12.5%
1950	409		39.6%
1960	312		−23.7%
1970	335		7.4%
1980	331		−1.2%
1990	267		−19.3%
2000	290		8.6%
2010	279		−3.8%
2020	213		−23.7%
U.S. Decennial Census

=== 2010 census ===
As of the census of 2010, there were 279 people, 106 households, and 75 families living in the town. The population density was 1,213.0 inhabitants per square mile (468.3/km^{2}). There were 111 housing units at an average density of 482.6 units per square mile (186.3 units/km^{2}). The racial makeup of the town was 99.3% White, 0.4% African American, and 0.4% from other races. Hispanic or Latino of any race were 2.2% of the population.

There were 106 households, of which 36.8% had children under the age of 18 living with them, 47.2% were married couples living together, 16.0% had a female householder with no husband present, 7.5% had a male householder with no wife present, and 29.2% were non-families. 20.8% of all households were made up of individuals, and 7.6% had someone living alone who was 65 years of age or older. The average household size was 2.63 and the average family size was 2.89.

The median age in the town was 40.1 years. 24.4% of residents were under the age of 18; 8.2% were between the ages of 18 and 24; 22.9% were from 25 to 44; 31.5% were from 45 to 64; and 12.9% were 65 years of age or older. The gender makeup of the town was 50.5% male and 49.5% female.

=== 2000 census ===
As of the census of 2000, there were 290 people, 105 households, and 82 families living in the town. The population density was 1,155.1 inhabitants per square mile (446.0/km^{2}). There were 111 housing units at an average density of 442.1 units per square mile (170.7 units/km^{2}). The racial makeup of the town was 98.97% White, 0.34% African American, and 0.69% from two or more races. Hispanic or Latino of any race were 0.34% of the population.

There were 105 households, out of which 43.8% had children under the age of 18 living with them, 52.4% were married couples living together, 15.2% had a female householder with no husband present, and 21.0% were non-families. 17.1% of all households were made up of individuals, and 5.7% had someone living alone who was 65 years of age or older. The average household size was 2.76 and the average family size was 3.08.

In the town, the population was spread out, with 29.7% under the age of 18, 9.3% from 18 to 24, 31.7% from 25 to 44, 19.0% from 45 to 64, and 10.3% who were 65 years of age or older. The median age was 34 years. For every 100 females, there were 92.1 males. For every 100 females age 18 and over, there were 94.3 males.

The median income for a household in the town was $36,250, and the median income for a family was $36,250. Males had a median income of $25,833 versus $20,000 for females. The per capita income for the town was $13,660. About 13.7% of families and 16.8% of the population were below the poverty line, including 20.2% of those under the age of eighteen and 21.7% of those 65 or over.

== Education ==
Tennyson has a public library, a branch of the Boonville-Warrick County Public Library.

Tennyson has one school, Tennyson Elementary School.
