= Warrick County, Indiana =

County in Indiana, United States

- County
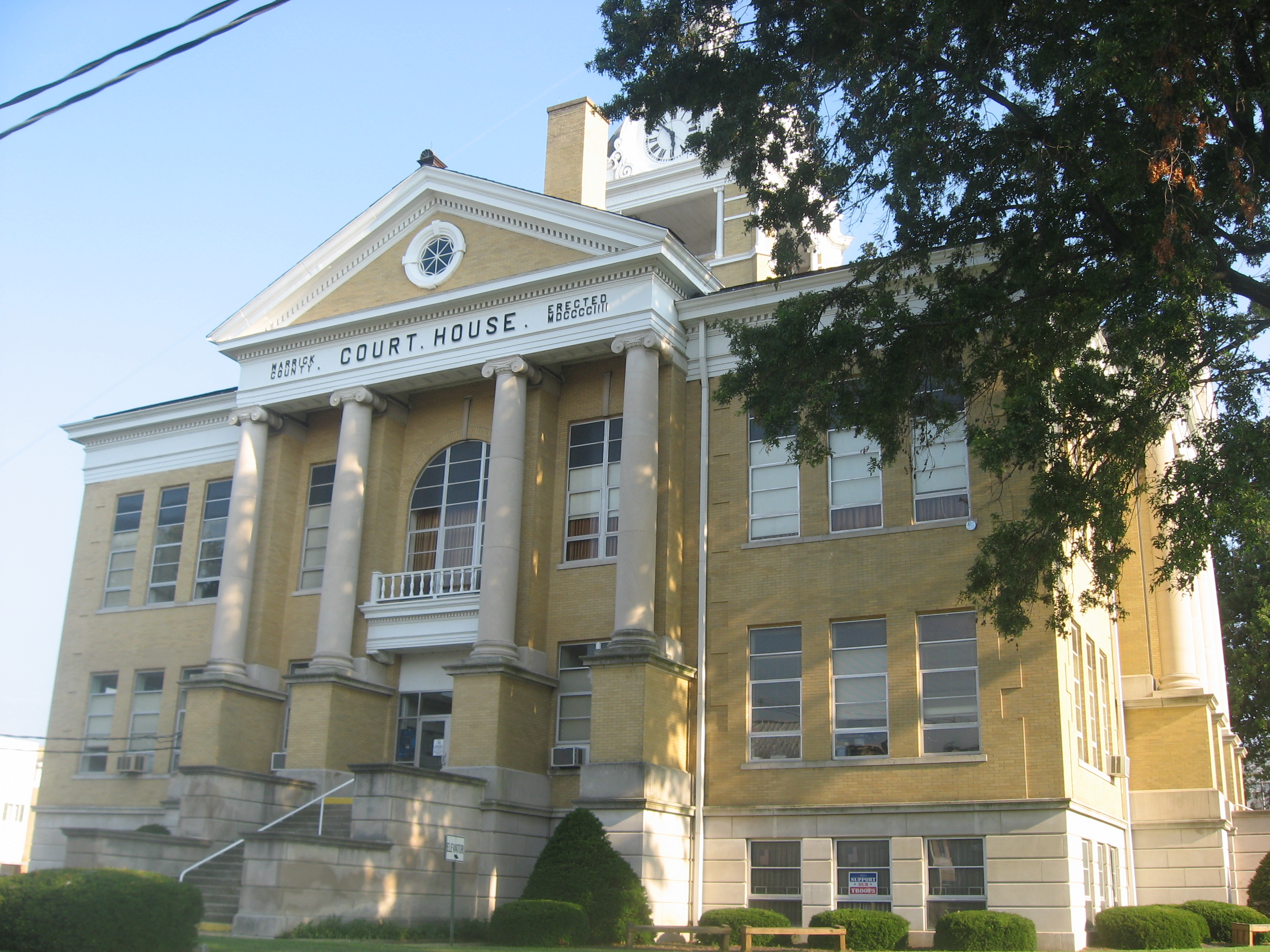
- Warrick County Courthouse in Boonville

- Location within the U.S. state of Indiana
- Coordinates: 38°06′N 87°16′W
- Country: United States
- State: Indiana
- Founded: April 30, 1813
- Named for: Jacob Warrick
- Seat: Boonville
- Largest city: Boonville

Area
  - Total: 391.05 sq mi (1,012.8 km^{2})
  - Land: 384.82 sq mi (996.7 km^{2})
  - Water: 6.24 sq mi (16.2 km^{2}) 1.60%

Population (2020)
  - Total: 63,898
  - Estimate (2025): 66,803 ▲
  - Density: 166.05/sq mi (64.111/km^{2})
- Time zone: UTC−6 (Central)
  - Summer (DST): UTC−5 (CDT)
- Congressional district: 8th
- Website: www.warrickcounty.gov
- Indiana county number 87; Eighth oldest county in Indiana

Warrick County is a county located in the U.S. state of Indiana. As of 2020, the population was 63,898. The county seat is Boonville. It was organized in 1813 and was named for Captain Jacob Warrick, an Indiana militia company commander killed in the Battle of Tippecanoe in 1811. It is one of the ten fastest-growing counties in Indiana.

Warrick County is the eastern part of the Evansville, IN–KY Metropolitan Statistical Area.

== History ==
Warrick County was formed by statute on March 9, 1813, effective April 30, 1813, from Knox County. Warrick and Gibson counties were both created out of this area of Knox County between the White River and the Ohio River. The boundaries of this area began at the mouth of the Wabash River; then up the Wabash River with the meanders thereof to the mouth of the White River; then up the White River with the meanders thereof to the Forks of the White River; then up White River East Fork to where the line between Sections 20 and 29, Township 1 North, Range 4 West, strikes the same; then with that line to the then Gibson County line; then with that line dividing Gibson and Knox Counties to the Ohio River; then down the Ohio River, to the place of beginning. The original boundary still exists in a series of slants along every north–south county line from Posey to Perry County as well as Crawford County's southernmost border. In Vanderburgh County, Baseline Road runs along the original boundary as well.

The same was divided into two separate and distinct counties, by a line beginning on the Wabash River, known as Rector's Base Line (was surveyed by William Rector on the line between Townships 4 South and 5 South, from New Harmony, Posey County, and Alton, Crawford County, Indiana), and with that line east until it intersects the then Gibson County line and that tract of land falling within the southern division thereof was Warrick County. However, because Gibson County organized a month earlier on April 1, this entire territory fell under Gibson County's jurisdiction. Within Warrick County's original jurisdiction included large portions but not entire portions of Crawford, Perry, Posey, Vanderburgh, and roughly 2/3s of Warrick County's current jurisdiction. Evansville was the original county seat, followed by Yankeetown, Newburgh, and finally Boonville, the current seat.

== Geography ==
According to the 2010 census, the county has a total area of 391.05 square miles (1,012.8 km^{2}), of which 384.82 square miles (996.7 km^{2}) (or 98.41%) is land and 6.24 square miles (16.2 km^{2}) (or 1.60%) is water.

=== Adjacent counties ===
- Pike County - north (ET)
- Dubois County - northeast (ET)
- Spencer County - east
- Daviess County, Kentucky - southeast
- Henderson County, Kentucky - south & southwest
- Vanderburgh County - west
- Gibson County - northwest

=== Cities and towns ===
- Boonville
- Chandler
- Elberfeld
- Lynnville
- Newburgh
- Tennyson
- Victoria Woods (recently established)

=== Unincorporated towns ===
- Bullocktown
- Camp Brosend
- Center
- De Gonia Springs
- Dickeyville
- Eames
- Eby
- Fisherville
- Folsomville
- Graham Valley
- Greenbrier
- Heilman
- Hillcrest Terrace
- Jockey
- Loafers Station
- Millersburg
- New Hope
- Paradise
- Pelzer
- Saint John
- Scalesville
- Selvin
- Stanley
- Stevenson
- Turpin Hill
- Vanada
- Victoria
- Wheatonville
- Yankeetown

=== Townships ===
- Anderson
- Boon
- Campbell
- Greer
- Hart
- Lane
- Ohio
- Owen
- Pigeon
- Skelton

=== Transit ===
- Warrick Area Transit System

=== Major highways ===
- I-64
- I-69
- SR 57
- SR 61
- SR 62
- SR 66
- SR 68
- SR 161
- SR 261
- SR 662

== Climate and weather ==
Boonville, Indiana

Climate chart (precipitation, max. and min. temperature)
J	F	M	A	M	J	J	A	S	O	N	D
3 41 23	3.3 47 26	5.1 57 35	4.3 68 44	5 77 54	4 86 63	4.6 89 67	3.4 87 64	2.7 81 57	3.2 70 46	4.6 56 36	4 45 27
- █ Average max. and min. temperatures in °F
- █ Precipitation totals in inches
- Source: The Weather Channel
Metric conversion
J	F	M	A	M	J	J	A	S	O	N	D
76 5 −5	85 8 −3	129 14 2	109 20 7	126 25 12	102 30 17	116 32 19	87 31 18	69 27 14	82 21 8	117 13 2	101 7 −3
- █ Average max. and min. temperatures in °C
- █ Precipitation totals in mm

In recent years, average temperatures in Boonville have ranged from a low of 23 °F (−5 °C) in January to a high of 89 °F (32 °C) in July, although a record low of −24 °F (−31 °C) was recorded in January 1994 and a record high of 101 °F (38 °C) was recorded in July 1999. Average monthly precipitation ranged from 2.71 inches (69 mm) in September to 5.08 inches (129 mm) in March.

== Demographics ==
Historical population
Census	Pop.	Note	%±
1820	1,749		—
1830	2,877		64.5%
1840	6,321		119.7%
1850	8,811		39.4%
1860	13,261		50.5%
1870	17,653		33.1%
1880	20,162		14.2%
1890	21,161		5.0%
1900	22,329		5.5%
1910	21,911		−1.9%
1920	19,862		−9.4%
1930	18,230		−8.2%
1940	19,435		6.6%
1950	21,527		10.8%
1960	23,577		9.5%
1970	27,972		18.6%
1980	41,474		48.3%
1990	44,920		8.3%
2000	52,383		16.6%
2010	59,689		13.9%
2020	63,898		7.1%
2025 (est.)	66,803	▲	4.5%
U.S. Decennial Census; 1790-1960 1900-1990; 1990-2000 2010-2013 2020

=== Racial and ethnic composition ===
Warrick County, Indiana – Racial and ethnic composition Note: the US Census treats Hispanic/Latino as an ethnic category. This table excludes Latinos from the racial categories and assigns them to a separate category. Hispanics/Latinos may be of any race.
Race / Ethnicity (NH = Non-Hispanic)	Pop 1980	Pop 1990	Pop 2000	Pop 2010	Pop 2020	% 1980	% 1990	% 2000	% 2010	% 2020
White alone (NH)	40,858	44,154	50,805	56,095	57,346	98.51%	98.29%	96.99%	93.98%	89.75%
Black or African American alone (NH)	294	371	516	780	1,038	0.71%	0.83%	0.99%	1.31%	1.62%
Native American or Alaska Native alone (NH)	40	82	76	98	92	0.10%	0.18%	0.15%	0.16%	0.14%
Asian alone (NH)	111	141	328	957	1,639	0.27%	0.31%	0.63%	1.60%	2.57%
Native Hawaiian or Pacific Islander alone (NH)	x	x	23	18	11	x	x	0.04%	0.03%	0.02%
Other race alone (NH)	20	4	25	57	183	0.05%	0.01%	0.05%	0.10%	0.29%
Mixed race or Multiracial (NH)	x	x	270	738	2,206	x	x	0.52%	1.24%	3.45%
Hispanic or Latino (any race)	151	168	340	946	1,383	0.36%	0.37%	0.65%	1.58%	2.16%
Total	41,474	44,920	52,383	59,689	63,898	100.00%	100.00%	100.00%	100.00%	100.00%

=== 2020 census ===
As of the 2020 census, the county had a population of 63,898. The median age was 41.2 years. 24.2% of residents were under the age of 18 and 18.4% of residents were 65 years of age or older. For every 100 females there were 96.8 males, and for every 100 females age 18 and over there were 94.4 males age 18 and over.

The racial makeup of the county was 90.4% White, 1.7% Black or African American, 0.2% American Indian and Alaska Native, 2.6% Asian, <0.1% Native Hawaiian and Pacific Islander, 0.8% from some other race, and 4.4% from two or more races. Hispanic or Latino residents of any race comprised 2.2% of the population.

73.3% of residents lived in urban areas, while 26.7% lived in rural areas.

There were 24,618 households in the county, of which 33.4% had children under the age of 18 living in them. Of all households, 58.6% were married-couple households, 14.3% were households with a male householder and no spouse or partner present, and 21.0% were households with a female householder and no spouse or partner present. About 22.8% of all households were made up of individuals and 10.5% had someone living alone who was 65 years of age or older.

There were 26,118 housing units, of which 5.7% were vacant. Among occupied housing units, 80.0% were owner-occupied and 20.0% were renter-occupied. The homeowner vacancy rate was 1.4% and the rental vacancy rate was 7.9%.

=== 2010 census ===
As of the 2010 United States census, there were 59,689 people, 22,505 households, and 17,009 families residing in the county. The population density was 155.1 inhabitants per square mile (59.9/km^{2}). There were 24,203 housing units at an average density of 62.9 per square mile (24.3/km^{2}). The racial makeup of the county was 95.0% white, 1.6% Asian, 1.3% black or African American, 0.2% American Indian, 0.5% from other races, and 1.3% from two or more races. Those of Hispanic or Latino origin made up 1.6% of the population. In terms of ancestry, 35.3% were German, 15.4% were Irish, 13.4% were American, and 12.5% were English.

Of the 22,505 households, 36.4% had children under the age of 18 living with them, 62.7% were married couples living together, 9.2% had a female householder with no husband present, 24.4% were non-families, and 20.7% of all households were made up of individuals. The average household size was 2.62 and the average family size was 3.02. The median age was 39.7 years.

The median income for a household in the county was $47,697 and the median income for a family was $73,583. Males had a median income of $51,961 versus $32,885 for females. The per capita income for the county was $29,737. About 3.9% of families and 6.1% of the population were below the poverty line, including 6.4% of those under age 18 and 6.3% of those age 65 or over.

== Government ==
Warrick County Sheriff's Department

Jurisdictional structure
- Operations jurisdiction: Warrick County, Indiana, United States
- Legal jurisdiction: As per operations jurisdiction
- General nature: Local civilian police

Operational structure
- Agency executive: Michael Wilder, Sheriff

Facilities
- Stations: 1
- Jails: 1

Website
- Warrick County Sheriff's Office

The county government is a constitutional body, and is granted specific powers by the Constitution of Indiana, and by the Indiana Code.

County council: The county council is the legislative branch of the county government and controls all the spending and revenue collection in the county. Four representatives are elected from county districts, and three are elected as "at-large" members. The council members serve four-year terms. They are responsible for setting salaries, the annual budget, and special spending. The council also has limited authority to impose local taxes, in the form of an income and property tax that is subject to state level approval, excise taxes, and service taxes.

Board of commissioners: The executive body of the county is made of a board of commissioners. The commissioners are elected county-wide, in staggered terms, and each serves a four-year term. One of the commissioners, typically the most senior, serves as president. The commissioners are charged with executing the acts legislated by the council, collecting revenue, and managing the day-to-day functions of the county government.

Court: The county maintains a small claims court that can handle some civil cases. The judge on the court is elected to a term of four years and must be a member of the Indiana Bar Association. The judge is assisted by a constable who is also elected to a four-year term. In some cases, court decisions can be appealed to the state level circuit court.

County officials: The county has several other elected offices, including sheriff, coroner, auditor, treasurer, recorder, surveyor, assessor, and circuit court clerk. Each of these elected officers serves a term of four years and oversees a different part of county government. Members elected to county government positions are required to declare party affiliations and to be residents of the county.

== Politics ==
Warrick County was a Republican-leaning swing county during the 20th Century, and since the turn of the 21st Century it has trended more reliably into the Republican column. The last Democrat to win the county was Bill Clinton by 64 votes in 1996 (a plurality due to high third-party performance), and the last Democrat to obtain a full majority was Jimmy Carter in 1976.

United States presidential election results for Warrick County, Indiana
Year	Republican		Democratic		Third party(ies)	
Year	No.	%	No.	%	No.	%
1888	2,361	47.05%	2,557	50.96%	100	1.99%
1892	2,018	42.75%	2,166	45.88%	537	11.37%
1896	2,482	45.78%	2,902	53.52%	38	0.70%
1900	2,540	46.22%	2,828	51.46%	127	2.31%
1904	2,796	50.49%	2,485	44.87%	257	4.64%
1908	2,839	48.37%	2,782	47.40%	248	4.23%
1912	1,421	28.09%	2,218	43.84%	1,420	28.07%
1916	2,396	48.41%	2,244	45.34%	309	6.24%
1920	4,675	51.75%	3,915	43.34%	443	4.90%
1924	4,437	51.49%	3,797	44.06%	383	4.44%
1928	4,603	54.12%	3,744	44.02%	158	1.86%
1932	3,429	37.74%	5,409	59.53%	248	2.73%
1936	3,968	42.08%	5,343	56.67%	118	1.25%
1940	5,456	51.88%	5,019	47.72%	42	0.40%
1944	5,042	55.01%	4,049	44.17%	75	0.82%
1948	4,602	48.75%	4,750	50.32%	88	0.93%
1952	6,064	56.35%	4,639	43.11%	59	0.55%
1956	6,286	57.21%	4,668	42.49%	33	0.30%
1960	6,482	56.10%	5,042	43.64%	30	0.26%
1964	4,376	37.59%	7,222	62.04%	42	0.36%
1968	5,742	47.53%	4,784	39.60%	1,555	12.87%
1972	8,520	65.84%	4,296	33.20%	125	0.97%
1976	7,200	47.69%	7,804	51.70%	92	0.61%
1980	8,681	52.39%	6,845	41.31%	1,044	6.30%
1984	10,202	61.32%	6,345	38.14%	90	0.54%
1988	10,504	56.58%	7,999	43.09%	61	0.33%
1992	8,087	39.23%	8,612	41.78%	3,915	18.99%
1996	9,221	43.68%	9,285	43.99%	2,603	12.33%
2000	13,205	59.19%	8,749	39.22%	355	1.59%
2004	16,930	65.05%	8,980	34.51%	115	0.44%
2008	16,013	55.75%	12,329	42.93%	379	1.32%
2012	17,680	62.19%	10,181	35.81%	566	1.99%
2016	19,113	63.84%	9,086	30.35%	1,740	5.81%
2020	21,326	62.93%	11,923	35.18%	641	1.89%
2024	21,280	64.10%	11,292	34.02%	624	1.88%

== Education ==
The county's school corporation is Warrick County School Corporation, which covers all of the county. which consists of 16 schools (two high schools, one senior/junior high, three middle schools, ten elementary schools, and one alternative school). In the fall of 2009, the corporation transitioned its stand-alone junior high schools in the Boonville and Castle districts from the junior high system to the middle school system, with the addition of one middle school (Castle South Middle School) in the Castle District. Castle Junior High was renamed Castle North Middle School. Warrick County's three middle schools are composed of grades six through eight.

=== Warrick County high schools ===
All are operated by the Warrick County School Corporation

High school	Towns/twps served	Nickname	Colors	Size	Conference
Boonville; High School	Boonville and Tennyson with students from parts of Anderson and Campbell Townships (Chandler and Yankeetown) having the option to attend Boonville or Castle secondary schools. Boon and Skelton	Pioneers	Black and Vegas gold	900	Pocket Athletic Conference
Castle; High School	Newburgh, and Chandler; Anderson, Campbell, and Ohio	Knights	Royal blue and gold	2,200	Southern Indiana Athletic Conference
Tecumseh Jr./Sr. High School	Lynnville and Elberfeld; Greer, Hart, Lane, Owen, and Pigeon	Braves	Red, white and blue	350	Pocket Athletic Conference (participates in football independently)

== See also ==
- National Register of Historic Places listings in Warrick County, Indiana
