= Warrick County School Corporation =

School district in Indiana

Coordinates: 38°03′08.2″N 87°16′18.0″W

- Map of Indiana highlighting Warrick County

Location
- 300 East Gum Street; Boonville, Indiana 47601 Southwestern Indiana; Warrick County United States

District information
- Grades: K-12
- Superintendent: Todd Lambert

Students and staff
- Students: 9,647 (27)
- Athletic conference: Big 8, PAC, SIAC
- District mascot: Brave, Knight, Pioneer
- Colors: See school list at left and below

Other information
- Graduation rate: 84.7%
- Website: Official website

The Warrick County School Corporation (WCSC) is the second-largest public school-governing body in Southwestern Indiana, and the 27th largest in the state. It is responsible for providing education to the second-largest county in the area, Warrick County; its boundaries are that of the county.

The WCSC has two high schools, two middle schools, one junior/senior high school, and ten elementary schools. Its headquarters is located at 300 East Gum Street in Boonville, Indiana. WCSC was in one of the three Indiana counties of the Gibson-Pike-Warrick Special Education Cooperative, along with Gibson and Pike, but now operates its special education independently.

== Schools ==
=== High schools ===
School	Location	Principal	2008 size	IHSAA class	Nickname	Colors	Conference
Boonville High School	Boonville	Mike Whitten	890	AAA(A)	Pioneers		Big Eight
John H. Castle Sr. High School	Newburgh	Jim Hood	1,783	AAAA(A)	Knights		Southern Indiana
Tecumseh Sr. High School	Lynnville	Richard Lance	344	A	Braves		Pocket; Independent*

- Plays football independently, but participates in the Pocket Athletic Conference in all other sports. Tecumseh is the smallest member of the PAC by quite a stretch.

(A) Castle: 5A in football, 4A in all other classed sports. Boonville: 4A in football, 3A in all other classed sports.

=== Middle schools ===
School	Location	Principal	2008 size	Grades	Mascot	Colors	High school
Boonville Middle School	Boonville	William Wilder	480	6–8	Panthers		Boonville High School
Castle North Middle School	Newburgh	John Bertram	905	6–8	Squires		John H. Castle High School
Castle South Middle School	Newburgh	Jim Hood	670	6–8	Dragons		John H. Castle High School
Tecumseh Junior High School	Lynnville	Richard Lance	190	7–8	Braves		Tecumseh Sr. High School

== Other facilities ==
- Southern Indiana Career & Technical Center

== Neighboring school districts ==
=== Indiana ===
- East Gibson School Corporation
- Pike County School Corporation
- South Gibson School Corporation
- Evansville Vanderburgh School Corporation
- Southwest Dubois County School Corporation
- South Spencer School Corporation
- North Spencer School Corporation

=== Kentucky ===
- Henderson County School System
- Daviess County Public Schools
