= Sarah Bolton =

Sarah Bolton may refer to:

- Sarah Knowles Bolton (1841–1916), American writer
- Sarah T. Bolton (1814–1893), American poet
  - Sarah T. Bolton (relief), an artwork by Emma Sangernebo
- Sarah Bolton (physicist), American scientist, college administrator and president of Whitman College
