= Meridian Street United Methodist Church =

Historic church in Indianapolis, Indiana, US

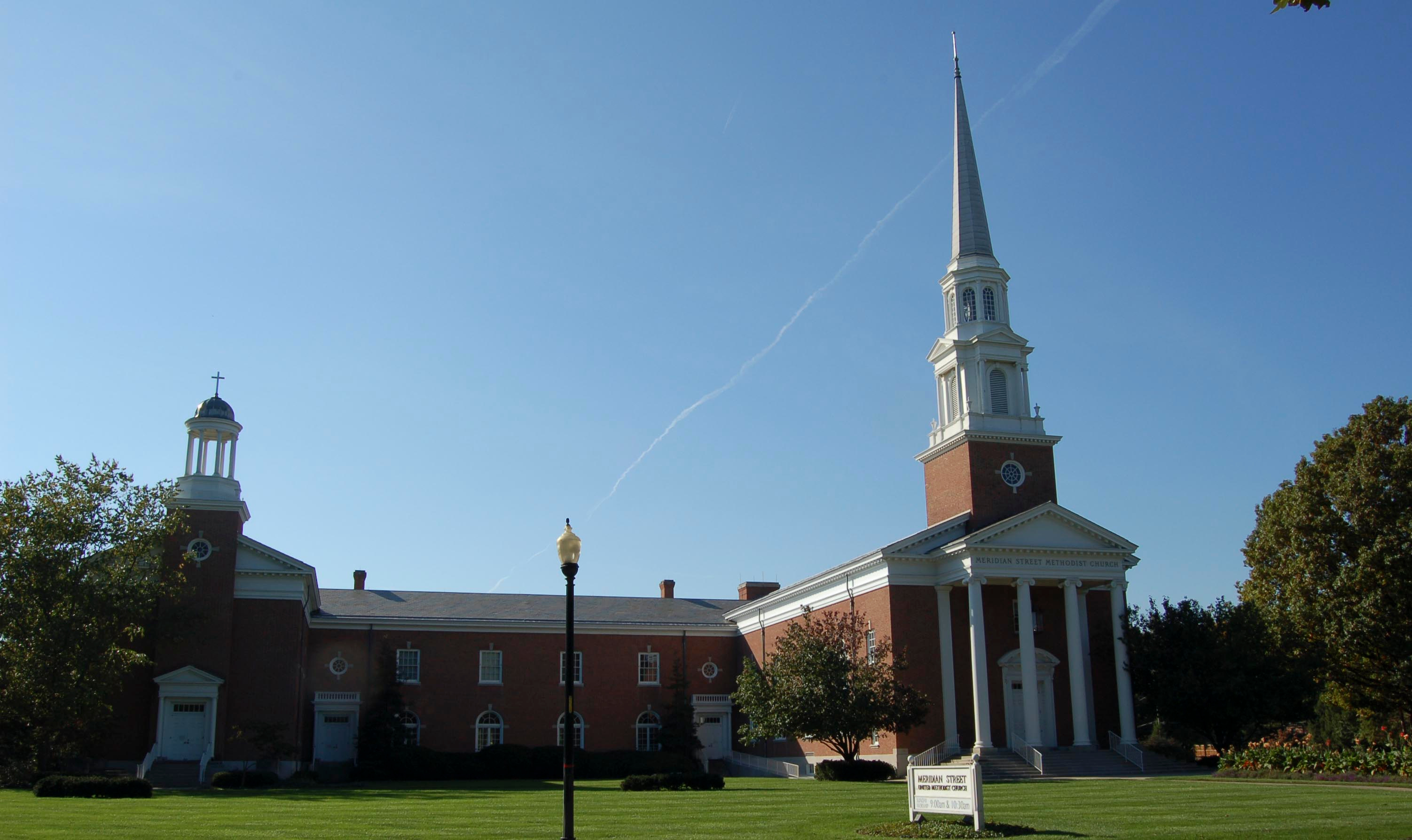
- Meridian Street United Methodist Church on October 8, 2006
- Meridian Street United Methodist Church
- 39.85222°N 86.15807°W
- Address: 5500 North Meridian Street, Indianapolis, Indiana
- Country: United States
- Denomination: United Methodist

History
- Founded: c. 1821
- Dedicated: June 29, 1952

Architecture
- Architect(s): Russ and Harrison
- Architectural type: Georgian-Colonial-style

Meridian Street United Methodist Church, known in its early years as Wesley Chapel, the Meridian Street Methodist Episcopal Church, and the Meridian Street Methodist Church, is a Methodist church located at 5500 North Meridian Street in Indianapolis, Indiana. The church originated from the first Methodist congregation in Indianapolis that began in a log cabin in 1821–22 with fifty members. The congregation worshipped at several locations and erected four earlier churches on Monument Circle and along Meridian Street in downtown Indianapolis before it merged with the Fifty-first Street Methodists in 1945. The first service at its North Meridian Street location was held on June 29, 1952. Designed by the architectural firm of Russ and Harrison, the Georgian-Colonial-style, red-brick church is noted for its architecture, pipe organ (one of the city's largest), and formal parlor. The Aldersgate addition on the west side (rear) of the church was consecrated on October 4, 1989.

The church conducts midweek and Sunday worship services in addition to its ongoing religious ministry and foreign missions. During its early years, the congregation was involved in the organization of Asbury University (present-day DePauw University) and Indianapolis's Methodist Hospital. The church's membership reached its peak in 1965 at 2,571 members, but declined in subsequent decades as the city expanded. Notable members of the congregation include former U.S. Vice President Charles W. Fairbanks; Albert J. Beveridge, a two-term U.S. senator and Pulitzer Prize-winning author; James F. Hanly, a former Indiana governor and U.S. congressman; Mary Stewart Carey, founder of The Children's Museum of Indianapolis; Calvin Fletcher, an early Indianapolis citizen who helped found the city's public school system; and industrialists and philanthropists James I. Holcomb and Herman C. Krannert.

== History ==
=== Origins ===
The Meridian Street United Methodist Church originated from the first Methodist congregation in Indianapolis, Indiana. Initial services and the first formal religious services held in Indianapolis began in 1819 when Resin Hammond conducted services under a walnut tree. The site was near the south end of the Indiana State House and is commemorated by a plaque within the State House.

In 1821, Reverend William Cravens, an ordained minister, organized a group of Methodists who began meeting in Isaac Wilson's log cabin. On September 2, 1824, the congregation acquired a log cabin on the south side of Maryland Street between Meridian and Illinois streets for $300 and enlarged it for use as a meetinghouse that could seat 200 people.

=== Chapel on the Circle ===
In 1829, the congregation erected its first new church, initially called the Indianapolis Circuit or the Indianapolis Station, at the southwest corner of Meridian Street and Governor's Circle (present-day Monument Circle). The lot and small, brick church cost an estimated $3,000. The two-story church had separate entrances for males and females.

In 1842, when the city's Methodist congregation exceeded 600 members, it divided into two smaller groups, a western and an eastern charge, using Meridian Street, a major north–south thoroughfare, as a boundary line between the new congregations. The western charge, which eventually became the Meridian Street United Methodist Church congregation, remained at its chapel on the Circle. The eastern charge, which was named Roberts Chapel and later known as Roberts Park Church, relocated to a site at the northwest corner of Market and Pennsylvania Streets. (The present-day Roberts Park United Methodist Church at the northeast corner of Delaware and Vermont Streets was dedicated on August 27, 1876, as the Roberts Park Methodist Episcopal Church.)

In 1845 the western charge was divided again. At that time the Methodist congregation on the Circle became known as the central charge, while a new western charge established Strange Chapel to serve Methodists living west of the Central Canal. In 1846, the original chapel on the Circle was demolished and replaced with a new one on the same site. The two-story, Romanesque Revival–style, which was called Wesley Chapel, cost an estimated $10,000. Its sanctuary was located on the second floor; a lecture hall, library, and study were on the first floor. The Wesley Chapel congregation remained on the Circle until it sold its chapel at public action to the Indianapolis Sentinel in 1868 for $28,000. The former church became known as the Waverly Building; it was demolished in 1922. Later, the site was developed for other commercial purposes.

=== Other early sites ===
After the Wesley Chapel congregation left its facility on the Circle in 1869, it purchased a site to erect a new church at the southwest corner of Meridian and New York Streets. While its new stone church was under construction, the congregation worshipped at other locations. The new church cost an estimated $100,000. By 1870 the congregation's name had been changed to Meridian Street Methodist Episcopal Church in reference to its new location. The Gothic Revival-style church was dedicated on December 10, 1871. Its second-floor sanctuary had a seating capacity of 1,000; the lower level included a lecture hall, classrooms, a study, and a parlor.

After the congregation's church at New York and Meridian Streets was destroyed by fire on November 17, 1904, the congregation met at the Propylaeum in University Park and elsewhere until its new church at Saint Clair and Meridian Streets was completed in 1906. The congregation was known as the Meridian Street Methodist Church from 1939 until 1968. Designed by the Indianapolis architectural firm of D. A. Bohlen and Son, the Gothic Revival-style church was constructed of Indiana limestone. The Saint Clair Street property cost $40,000; the new church cost an estimated $125,000. The church's cornerstone was laid on November 30, 1905. The facility housed the congregation until 1947. Its front facade had three oak doors beneath a large, stained-glass window. The building also included two 95-foot (29 m) towers with spires and had five stained-glass windows on each of the sanctuary's north and south walls. The church's pipe organ contained 1,572 pipes. The congregation's last service at the Meridian and Saint Clair Street site was held on December 7, 1947. The church building, which still stands, was subsequently sold to the Indiana Business College.

On May 14, 1945, the Fifty-first Street Methodist Church congregation agreed to a merger with the Meridian Street Methodists. Until funds were raised to build a new church on Meridian Street, the combined congregation met at the Fifty-first Street facility, which was located at Fifty-first Street and Central Avenue.

=== Present-day church ===
The architectural firm of Russ and Harrison designed the present-day Meridian Street United Methodist Church at 5500 North Meridian Street. The cost to construct the church in 1950 was $909,364. Donations to the church's building campaign and a mortgage paid for its construction. Its cornerstone was laid on September 17, 1950; the first service was held in the new building on June 29, 1952.

In 1968, the church was renamed the Meridian Street United Methodist Church following a merger of the Methodist Church with the Evangelical United Brethren Church to become the United Methodist Church.

Construction on the church's Aldersgate addition, which is connected to the main building, began in 1988; it was consecrated on October 4, 1989. A low bid submitted for the building project was $2.3 million. Funding for the construction came from donations made to the church's building campaign, as well as a mortgage.

== Description ==
Notable features of the church on North Meridian Street are its Georgian-Colonial-style architecture, pipe organ, and formal parlor. The two-story church, a smaller chapel to the south, and a two-story wing that connects the church to the chapel were built in the early 1950s; the Aldersgate addition on the building's west side, at the rear of the church, was built in 1988–89. The red-brick exterior has wood trim that is painted white. The church's front facade, which faces east toward Meridian Street, includes a two-story portico with four columns. A 150-foot (46 m) steeple was erected at the front edge of the church's gable roof. A domed cupola rests atop the chapel's gable roof, above its front entrance.

The church's sanctuary has a seating capacity of 600; the chapel seats 100; and the lower level below the sanctuary contains a dining hall. The church's pipe organ is made by Casavant Frères of Canada and contains more than 3,500 pipes (58 ranks, each one comprising 61 pipes). It is one of the largest pipe organs in Indianapolis and cost $26,800 when it was installed in 1952. The church's formal parlor measures 28 feet (8.5 m) by 78 feet (24 m) and cost $127,000 to decorate in the early 1950s with Sheraton- and Hepplewhite-style furniture. The use of the parlor was restricted to women's group meetings and receptions, including the church's Women's Society for Christian Service group.

== Mission ==
In addition to its religious ministry, church leaders and members of the Meridian Street congregation were involved in the organization of Indiana Asbury University (renamed DePauw University in 1884) in Greencastle, Indiana. Several of its ministers and congregational members were present when the cornerstone was laid for the school's first building and served as university trustees. Over the years the Meridian Street Methodists continued to contribute to the university's endowment.

The church was also involved in forming Indianapolis's Methodist Hospital. On October 10, 1899, an organizational meeting of Methodist Hospital's board of trustees was held at the Meridian Street Methodist Church. (At that time the church was located at Meridian and New York Streets.) The church also continued to support the hospital through financial gifts. Several of its members have served as trustees of the hospital.

Foreign missions have been an important aspect of the church's ministry. In the past the congregation has supported missions to several countries in Africa, as well as Indonesia, Bolivia, South Korea, and China. In addition, it has supported mission trips to aid communities in the United States and provided support to the Indianapolis community through the Fletcher Place Community Center, among others. In 1965 it also acquired a camp in Cloverdale, Indiana. The facility was renamed Camp Otto in honor of Mr. and Mrs. William Otto, who were church members.

The church's United Methodist Women and its predecessors, the Women's Association and the Women's Society for Christian Service, have supported the religious needs of the congregation, in addition to conducting numerous fund-raising projects to benefit the church and its various missions.

== Membership ==
The congregation formed in 1821–22 with 50 initial members; later that decade the Indianapolis Journal reported the church's membership had reached 93. By 1829 its membership had grown to 300.

In 1842, when the city's Methodists was divided into two groups, the Wesley Chapel congregation, the predecessor to the Meridian Street United Methodist Church, had slightly more than 600 members. After the division the Meridian Street congregation continued to grow. Author W. R. Holloway reported in his history of Indianapolis, published in 1870, that the church's membership was 504; however, a history of the church published in 1995 reported its membership in 1870 was 449. The congregation did not have more than 600 members again until the mid-1890s. Historian Jacob Piatt Dunn Jr. reported in Greater Indianapolis (1910) that the Meridian Street Methodist congregation had reached 753 members.

In 1935, prior to the merger with the Fifty-first Street Methodists, the Meridian Street congregation had fallen to 566 members. The merged congregation reached its peak in 1965 at 2,571 members, but declined as the city expanded in the 1970s and 1980s. New and even larger congregations moved to new facilities north of downtown Indianapolis and surpassed the Meridian Street Methodist Church's membership in the 1990s.

Men have dominated the mostly all-white congregation's decision-making authority since the early years of its history. Very few women held leadership positions in the church prior to the merger with the Fifty-first Street Methodists in 1945. Leadership changes were slow to occur. In the 1990s the conservative and formal worship services continued to attract predominantly white, upper-middle-class members who lived in the Indianapolis metropolitan area. By 1995 about one-third of the church's elected administrative board were women and one-third of its trustees were women; a few women served on its finance and pastor-parish relations committees.

=== Notable members ===
- Lucien W. Berry, minister of Wesley Chapel from 1842 to 1843, served as the second president of Asbury University (present-day DePauw University) in 1849.
- Albert J. Beveridge, an Indianapolis lawyer, was also a two-term U.S. Senator from Indiana and Pulitzer Prize-winning author.
- Mary Stewart Carey was the founder of The Children's Museum of Indianapolis.
- Charles W. Fairbanks, a lawyer and former U.S. Senator from Indiana, was Theodore Roosevelt’s vice presidential running mate. Fairbanks was elected the 26th U.S. vice president in 1904.
- Calvin Fletcher, an Indianapolis lawyer, helped found the city's public school system.
- James F. Hanly was a former Indiana governor and U.S. congressman.
- James I. Holcomb was an Indianapolis industrialist and philanthropist.
- Herman C. Krannert was the founder of Inland Container Corporation and a philanthropist.
- Charles W. Sims, minister at the church from 1867 to 1870 and 1893 to 1898, was a former president of Valparaiso University, the fifth president of Asbury University (DePauw University), and chancellor of Syracuse University.

== See also ==
- Indianapolis Historic Preservation Commission
