= Thomas R. Marshall =

Vice President of the United States from 1913 to 1921

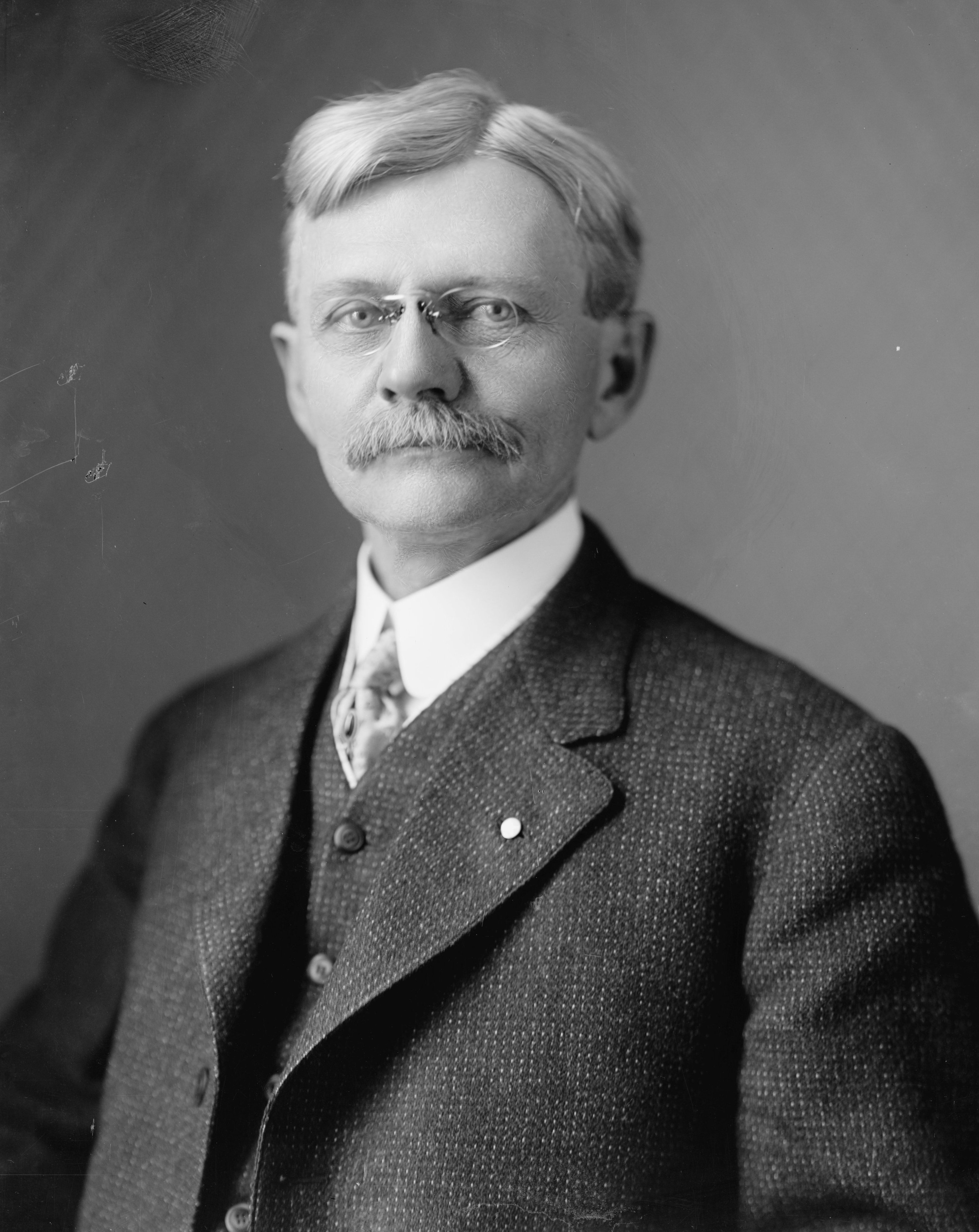
- Marshall, c. 1910s

28th Vice President of the United States
- In office March 4, 1913 – March 4, 1921
- President: Woodrow Wilson
- Preceded by: James S. Sherman
- Succeeded by: Calvin Coolidge

27th Governor of Indiana
- In office January 11, 1909 – January 13, 1913
- Lieutenant: Frank J. Hall
- Preceded by: Frank Hanly
- Succeeded by: Samuel M. Ralston

Personal details
- Born: Thomas Riley Marshall; March 14, 1854 North Manchester, Indiana, U.S.
- Died: June 1, 1925 (aged 71) Washington, D.C., U.S.
- Resting place: Crown Hill Cemetery and Arboretum Sec 72, Lot 1; 39.8194807°N 86.17387°W
- Party: Democratic
- Spouse: Lois Kimsey (m. 1895)
- Children: 1 foster son (Note: Marshall and his wife, Lois, never officially adopted Morrison, whose legal name was Clarence Ignatius Morrison. (Gugin and St. Clair, eds., 2006, p. 241.))
- Education: Wabash College (BA)

Thomas Riley Marshall (March 14, 1854 – June 1, 1925) was the 28th vice president of the United States from 1913 to 1921 under President Woodrow Wilson. A prominent lawyer in Indiana, he became an active and well-known member of the Democratic Party by stumping across the state for other candidates and organizing party rallies that later helped him win election as the 27th governor of Indiana. In office, he attempted to incorporate items from his progressive agenda into the Constitution of Indiana, but was blocked by the Indiana Supreme Court.

Marshall's popularity as Indiana governor, and the state's status at the time as a critical swing state, helped him secure the Democratic vice presidential nomination on the ticket with Wilson in 1912, and they won the subsequent general election. An ideological rift developed between them during their first term leading Wilson to limit Marshall's influence in the administration. Marshall's brand of humor caused Wilson to move Marshall's office away from the White House, further isolating him. Marshall was targeted in an assassination attempt in 1915 for supporting intervention in World War I. (Note: Marshall is also the only known vice president of the United States to have been exclusively targeted in an assassination attempt while in office. An assassination attempt was made on Andrew Johnson while he was Vice President, but that was part of the plot to also assassinate Abraham Lincoln and William H. Seward.) During Marshall's second term he delivered morale-boosting speeches across the nation during the war and became the first U.S. vice president to hold cabinet meetings, which he did while Wilson was in Europe during peace negotiations. As he was president of the United States Senate, a small number of anti-war Senators kept it deadlocked by refusing to end debate. To enable critical wartime legislation to be passed, Marshall had the body adopt its first procedural rule allowing filibusters to be ended by a two-thirds majority vote—a variation of this rule remains in effect.

Marshall's vice presidency is most remembered for a leadership crisis following a stroke that incapacitated Wilson in October 1919. Because of their personal dislike for Marshall, Wilson's advisers and wife Edith sought to keep him uninformed about the president's condition to prevent him from assuming presidential powers and duties. Many people, including cabinet officials and congressional leaders, urged Marshall to become acting president, but he refused to forcibly assume Wilson's powers, not wanting to set a standard of doing so. Without strong leadership in the executive branch, the administration's opponents defeated the ratification of the League of Nations treaty and returned the United States to an isolationist foreign policy. Marshall ended his time in office as the first vice president since Daniel D. Tompkins, nearly a century earlier, to serve two full terms, and the first vice president re-elected, since John C. Calhoun.

Marshall was known for his wit and sense of humor. One of his most enduring jokes provoked widespread laughter from his Senate colleagues during a floor debate. Responding to Senator Joseph Bristow's catalog of the nation's needs, Marshall quipped that, "What this country needs is a really good five-cent cigar." After his terms as vice president, he opened an Indianapolis law practice where he authored several legal books and his memoir, Recollections. He continued to travel and speak publicly. In 1925, Marshall died following a heart attack while on a trip to Washington, D.C.

== Early life ==
=== Family and background ===
Marshall's paternal grandfather, Riley Marshall, immigrated to Indiana in 1817 and settled on a farm in present-day Whitley County. (Note: According to a book published in 1930, Riley Marshall was the nephew of Chief Justice of the United States John Marshall. However, this fact is not mentioned in other Marshall biographies. (Federal Writers' Project 1930, p. 130.)) He became wealthy when a moderate deposit of oil and natural gas was discovered on his farm; when he sold the property in 1827 it earned $25,000, $523,750 in 2015 chained dollars. The money allowed him to purchase a modest estate and spend the rest of his life as an active member of the Indiana Democratic Party, serving as an Indiana State Senator, party chairman, and financial contributor. He was also able to send his only child, Daniel, to medical school.

Marshall's mother, Martha Patterson, was orphaned at age thirteen while living in Ohio and moved to Indiana to live with her sister on a farm near the Marshalls' home. Martha was known for her wit and humor, as her son later would be. (Note: An example of Martha's humor: When asked why her family moved to Ohio, she replied that their Pennsylvania home had only four families and after intermarrying for several generations her parents decided it best to leave the area before their children married their uncle-cousins and had "imbecile children." (Bennett 2007, p. 19.)) Martha and Daniel met and married in 1848.

Thomas Riley Marshall was born in North Manchester, Indiana, on March 14, 1854. Two years later, a sister was born, but she died in infancy. Martha had contracted tuberculosis, which Daniel believed to be the cause of their infant daughter's poor health. While Marshall was still a young boy, his family moved several times searching a good climate for Daniel to attempt different "outdoor cures" on Martha. They moved first to Quincy, Illinois in 1857. While the family was living in Illinois, Daniel Marshall, a supporter of the American Union and a staunch Democrat, took his four-year-old son, Thomas, to the Lincoln and Douglas debate in Freeport in 1858. Marshall later recalled that during the rally he sat on the laps of Stephen Douglas and Abraham Lincoln, alternating between the two candidates when they were not speaking, and remembered it as one of his earliest and most cherished memories.

The family moved to Osawatomie, Kansas, in 1859, but the frontier violence caused them to move to Missouri in 1860. Eventually, Daniel succeeded in curing Martha's disease. As the American Civil War neared, violence spread into Missouri during the Bleeding Kansas incidents. In October 1860 several men led by Duff Green demanded that Daniel Marshall provide medical assistance to the pro-slavery faction, but he refused, and the men left. When the Marshalls' neighbors warned that Green was planning to return and murder them, the family quickly packed their belongings and escaped by steamboat to Illinois. The Marshalls remained in Illinois only briefly, before relocating to Indiana, which was even farther from the volatile border region.

=== Education ===
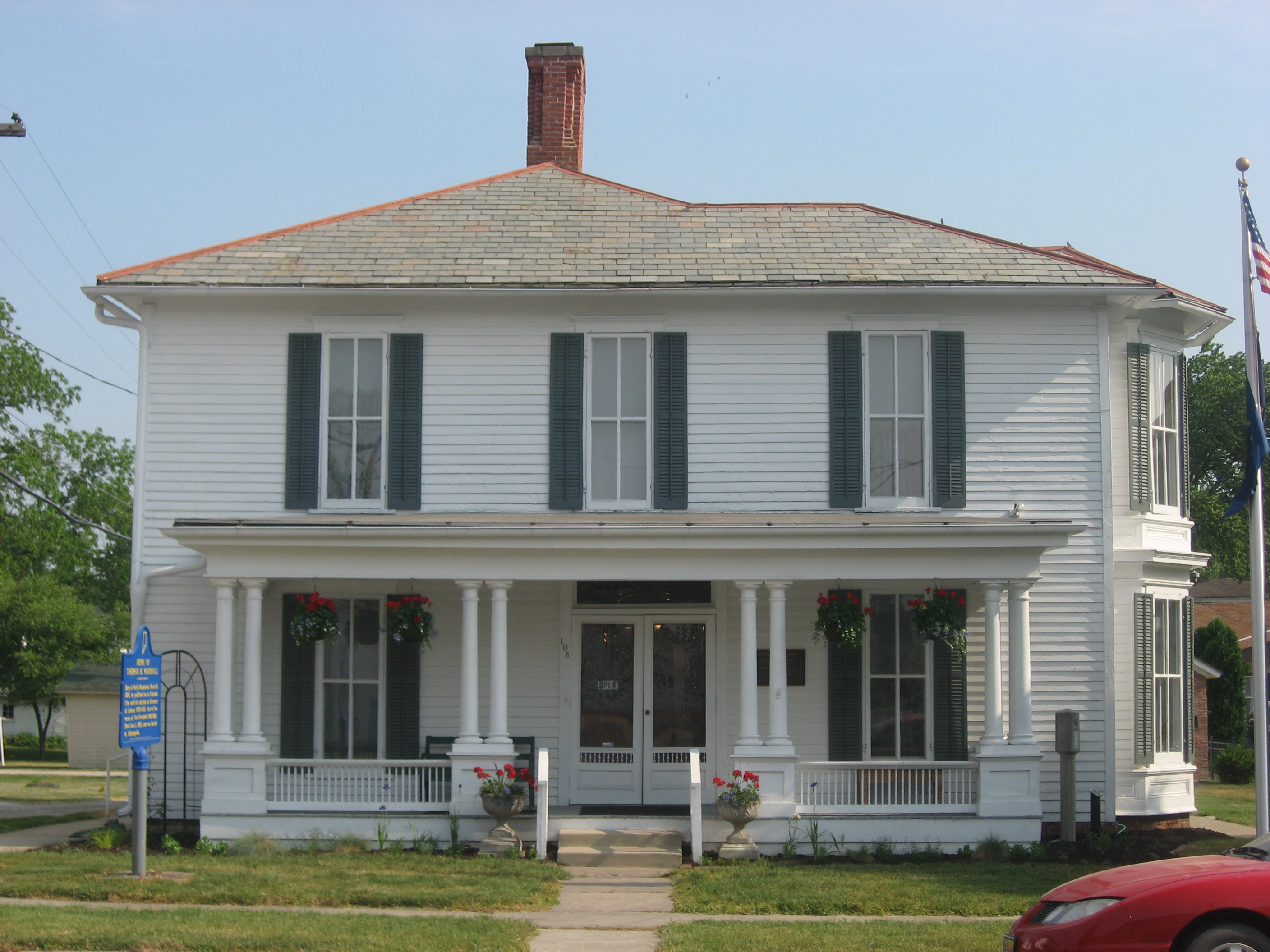
The Thomas R. Marshall House at Columbia City was listed on the National Register of Historic Places in 1983.

On settling in Pierceton, Indiana, Marshall began to attend public school. His father and grandfather became embroiled in a dispute with their Methodist minister when they refused to vote Republican in the 1862 election. The minister threatened to expel them from the church, to which Marshall's grandfather replied that he would "take his risk on hell, but not the Republican Party". The dispute prompted the family to move again, to Fort Wayne, and convert to the Presbyterian church. In Fort Wayne, Marshall attended high school, graduating in 1869. At age fifteen his parents sent him to Wabash College, in Crawfordsville, where he received a classical education. His father advised him to study medicine or become a minister, but neither interested him; he entered the school without knowing which profession he would take upon graduation.

During college Marshall joined the Phi Gamma Delta fraternity, participated in literary and debating societies, and founded a Democratic Club. He secured a position on the staff of the college newspaper, the Geyser, and began writing political columns defending Democratic policies. In 1872 he wrote an unfavorable column about a female lecturer at the school, accusing her of "seeking liberties" with the young boys in their boarding house. She hired lawyer Lew Wallace, the author of Ben-Hur, and filed a suit demanding that Marshall pay her $20,000 for libel. Marshall traveled to Indianapolis to find a defense lawyer and employed future United States President Benjamin Harrison, then a prominent Indianapolis lawyer. Harrison had the suit dropped by showing that the charges made by Marshall were probably true. In Marshall's memoir, he wrote that when he approached Harrison to pay his bill, his lawyer informed him that he would not charge him for the service, but instead gave him a lecture on the ethics of making such charges public. Marshall later recalled that he took the advice to heart, and was never again accused of making comments that could be considered libelous.

Marshall was elected to Phi Beta Kappa during his final year at college. He graduated in June 1873, receiving the top grade in fourteen of his thirty-six courses in a class of twenty-one students. Because of his libel case, he had become increasingly interested in law and began seeking someone to teach him. At that time, a common way to become a lawyer was to apprentice under a practicing attorney. Marshall's great-uncle Woodson Marshall began to help him, but the younger Marshall soon moved to Columbia City, Indiana, to live with his parents. Marshall read law for more than a year in the Columbia City law office of Walter Olds, a future member of the Indiana Supreme Court, and was admitted to the bar on April 26, 1875.

=== Law practice ===
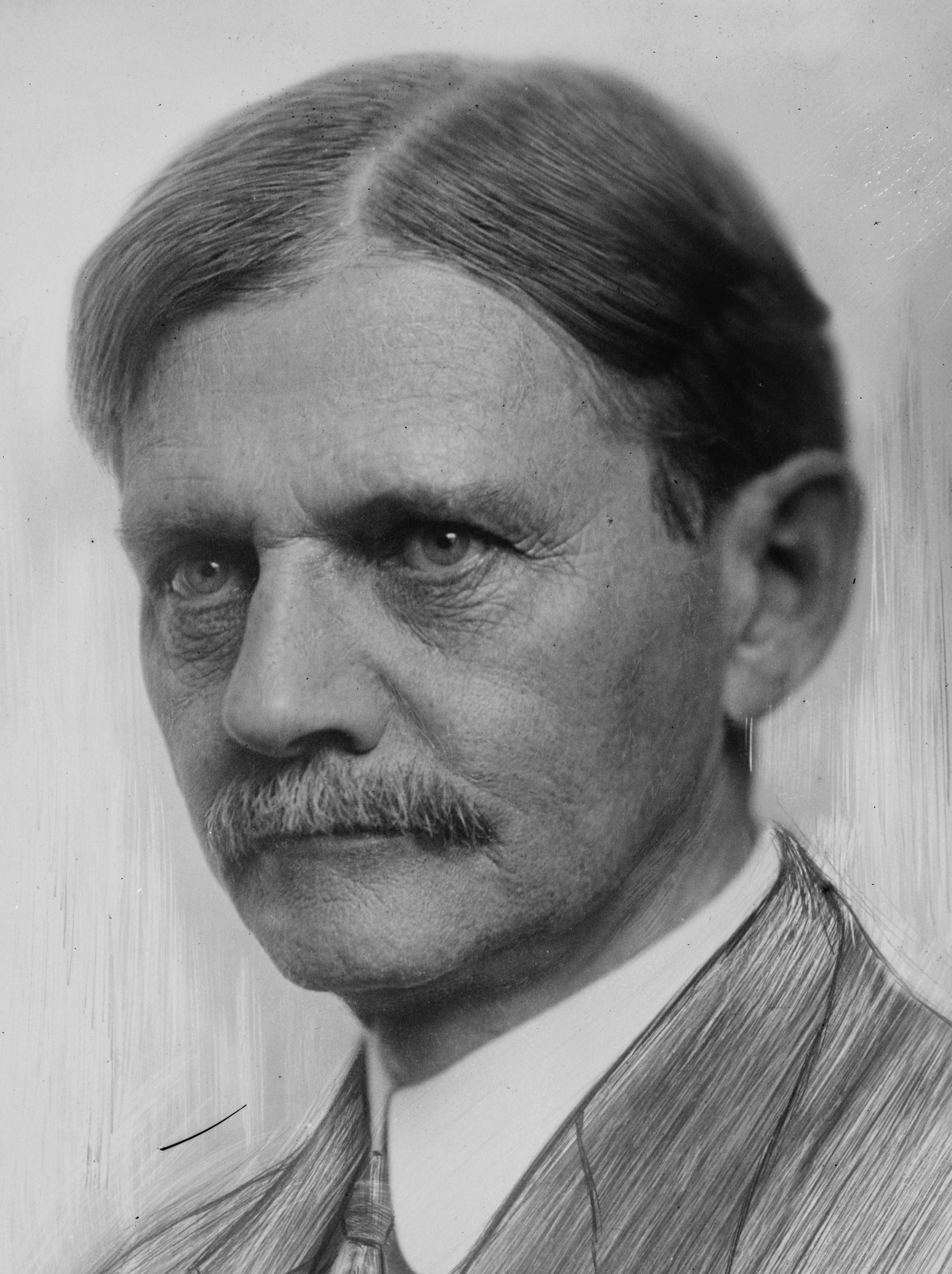
Marshall c. 1912

Marshall opened a law practice in Columbia City in 1876, taking on many minor cases. After gaining prominence, he accepted William F. McNagny as a partner in 1879 and began taking many criminal defense cases. The two men functioned well as partners. McNagny was better educated in law and worked out their legal arguments. Marshall, the superior orator, argued the cases before the judge and jury. Their firm became well known in the region after they handled a number of high-profile cases. In 1880 Marshall ran for public office for the first time as the Democratic candidate for his district's prosecuting attorney. The district was a Republican stronghold, and he was defeated. About the same time, he met and began to court Kate Hooper, and the two became engaged to marry. Kate died of an illness in 1882, one day before they were to be wed. Her death was a major emotional blow to Marshall, leading him to become an alcoholic.

Marshall lived with his parents into his thirties. His father died in the late 1880s and his mother died in 1894, leaving him with the family estate and business. In 1895, while working on a case, Marshall met Lois Kimsey who was working as a clerk in her father's law firm. Despite their nineteen-year age difference, the couple fell in love and married on October 2. The Marshalls had a close marriage and were nearly inseparable, and spent only two nights apart during their nearly thirty-year marriage.

Marshall's alcoholism had begun to interfere with his busy life before his marriage. He arrived at court hung-over on several occasions and was unable to keep his addiction secret in his small hometown. His wife helped him to overcome his drinking problem and give up liquor after she locked him in their home for two weeks to undergo a treatment regimen. Thereafter, he became active in temperance organizations and delivered several speeches about the dangers of liquor. Although he had stopped drinking, his past alcoholism was later raised by opponents during his gubernatorial election campaign.

Marshall remained active in the Democratic party after his 1880 defeat and began stumping for other candidates and helping to organize party rallies across the state. His speeches were noted for their partisanship, but his rhetoric gradually shifted away from a conservative viewpoint in the 1890s as he began to identify himself with the growing progressive movement. He became a member of the state Democratic Central Committee in 1904, a position that raised his popularity and influence in the party.

Marshall and his wife were involved in several private organizations. He was active in the Presbyterian Church, taught Sunday school, and served on the county fair board. As he grew wealthy from his law firm he became involved in local charities. An enthusiastic Mason in Columbia City Lodge No. 189 in the Grand Lodge of Indiana, he was a governing member of the state's York Rite bodies, awarded the thirty-third degree of the Scottish Rite in 1898, and became an Active member of the Supreme Council, Scottish Rite, Northern Jurisdiction in 1911. He remained a passionate Freemason until his death and served on several Masonic charitable boards. After his death, the $25,000 cost of erecting his mausoleum in Indianapolis' Crown Hill Cemetery was gratefully paid for by the Scottish Rite NMJ Supreme Council.

== Governorship (1909–1913) ==
=== Campaign ===
In 1906, Marshall declined his party's nomination to run for Congress. He hinted, however, to state party leaders that he would be interested in running for Indiana governor in the 1908 election. He soon gained the support of several key labor unions, and was endorsed by Louis Ludlow, a reporter for the Indianapolis Star. Despite this support, Marshall was a dark horse candidate at the state convention. Initially, Thomas Taggart, Indiana Democratic Party boss, did not support him because of Marshall's support of prohibition. Taggart wanted the party to nominate anti-prohibitionist Samuel Ralston, but the prohibitionist and anti-Taggart factions united with Marshall's supporters. To oppose L. Ert Slack, a temperance candidate, Taggart persuaded Ralston's delegates to support Marshall and give him the votes he needed to win the nomination.

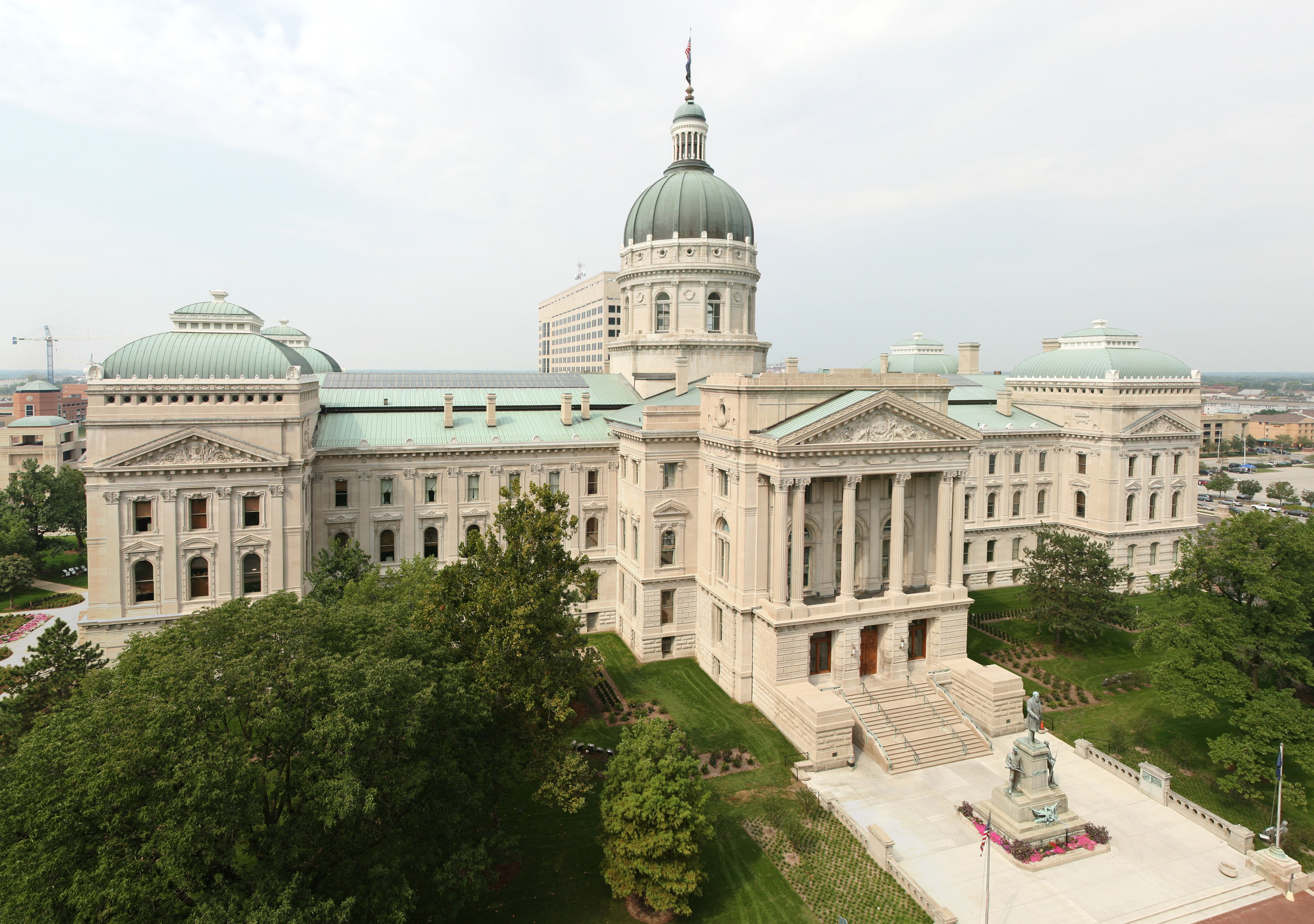
The Indiana Statehouse in Indianapolis

Marshall's opponent in the general election was Republican Congressman James E. Watson, and the campaign focused on temperance and prohibition. Just as it began, the Republican-controlled state government passed a local-option law that allowed counties to ban the sale of liquor. The law became the central point of debate between the parties and their gubernatorial candidates. The Democrats proposed that the local-option law be changed so that the decision to ban liquor sales could be made at the city and township level. This drew support from anti-prohibitionists, who saw it as an opportunity to roll back prohibition in some areas, and as the only alternative available to the total prohibition which the Republican Party advocated. The Democratic position also helped to retain prohibitionists' support by allowing prohibition to remain enacted in communities where a majority supported it. The Republican Party was in the midst of a period of instability, splitting along progressive and conservative lines. Their internal problems proved to be the deciding factor in the election, giving Marshall a narrow victory: he received 48.1 percent of the vote to Watson's 48.0 percent. Democrats also came to power in the Indiana House of Representatives by a small margin, though Republicans retained control of the Indiana Senate.

=== Progressive agenda ===
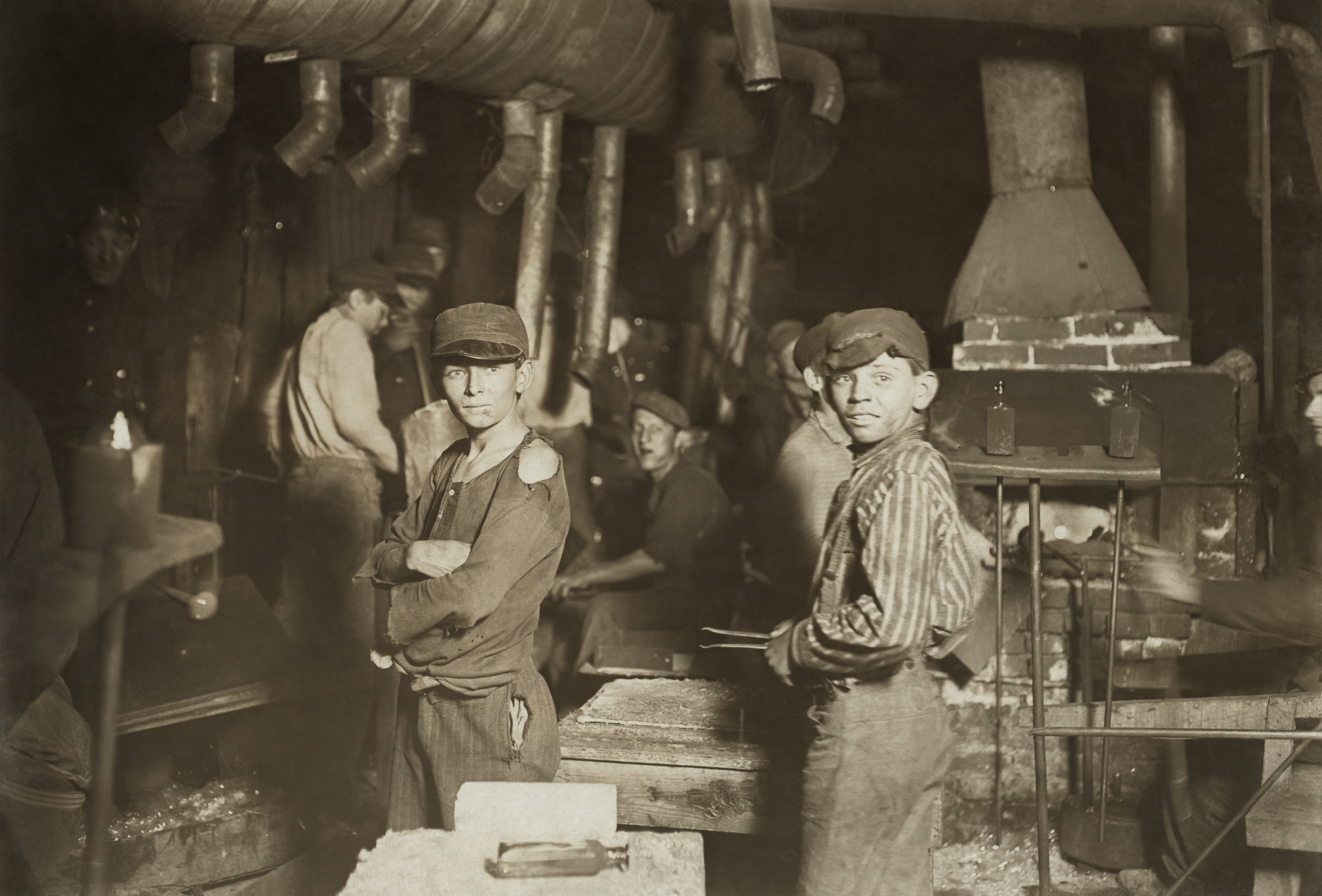
Children at an Indiana glass factory. Child labor was ended in Indiana by Marshall's child labor laws.

Marshall was inaugurated as Governor of Indiana on January 11, 1909. Since his party had been out of power for many years, its initial objective was to appoint as many Democrats as possible to patronage positions. Marshall tried to avoid becoming directly involved in the patronage system. He allowed the party's different factions to have positions and appointed very few of his own choices. He allowed Taggart to manage the process and pick the candidates, but signed off on the official appointments. Although his position on patronage kept peace in his party, it prevented him from building a strong political base.

During his term, Marshall focused primarily on advancing the progressive agenda. He successfully advocated the passage of a child labor law and anti-corruption legislation. He supported popular election of U.S. Senators, and the constitutional amendment to allow it was ratified by the Indiana General Assembly during his term. He also overhauled the state auditing agencies and claimed to have saved the government millions of dollars. Various measures aimed at improving working conditions were also approved, together with a bill that sought to improve tenement housing conditions in Indiana's two largest cities. He was unsuccessful in passing the rest of the progressive platform agenda items or persuading the legislature to call a convention to rewrite the state constitution to expand the government's regulatory powers.

Marshall was a strong opponent of Indiana's recently passed eugenics and sterilization laws, and ordered state institutions not to follow them. He was an early, high-profile opponent of eugenics laws, and he carried his opposition into the vice-presidency. His governorship was the first in which no state executions took place, due to his opposition to capital punishment and his practice of pardoning and commuting the sentences of people condemned to execution. He regularly attacked corporations and used recently created antitrust laws to attempt to break several large businesses. He participated in a number of ceremonial events, including laying the final golden brick to complete the Indianapolis Motor Speedway in 1909.

Democratic Party campaign literature emphasized Marshall's record as governor, with one Democratic textbook from 1912 listing various laws enacted during his time in office by his instance. These included acts to investigate industrial and agricultural education; to permit night schools In cities; to prevent traffic in white slaves; to establish uniform weights and measures; to provide police court matrons; to protect against loan sharks; to strengthen the pure food act; to establish public play grounds; to provide free treatment for hydrophobia; to regulate the sale of cocaine and other drugs; to prevent blindness at birth; to require hygienic schoolhouses to permit medical examination of school children; to regulate the sale of cold storage products; to curtail child labor; and to "require medical supplies as part of a train equipment, etc." The textbook also listed various laws "intended to protect the toilers" that were also championed by Marshall. These included laws to require storm windows for locomotives; to require full switching crews; to require standard cabooses; to require inspection of locomotive boilers; to provide efficient headlights on locomotives; to require safety devices on switch engines; to require full train crews; to establish free employment agencies; to create a bureau of inspection for factories, workshops, mines and boilers; and to "provide a weekly wage; etc."

=== Marshall's constitution ===
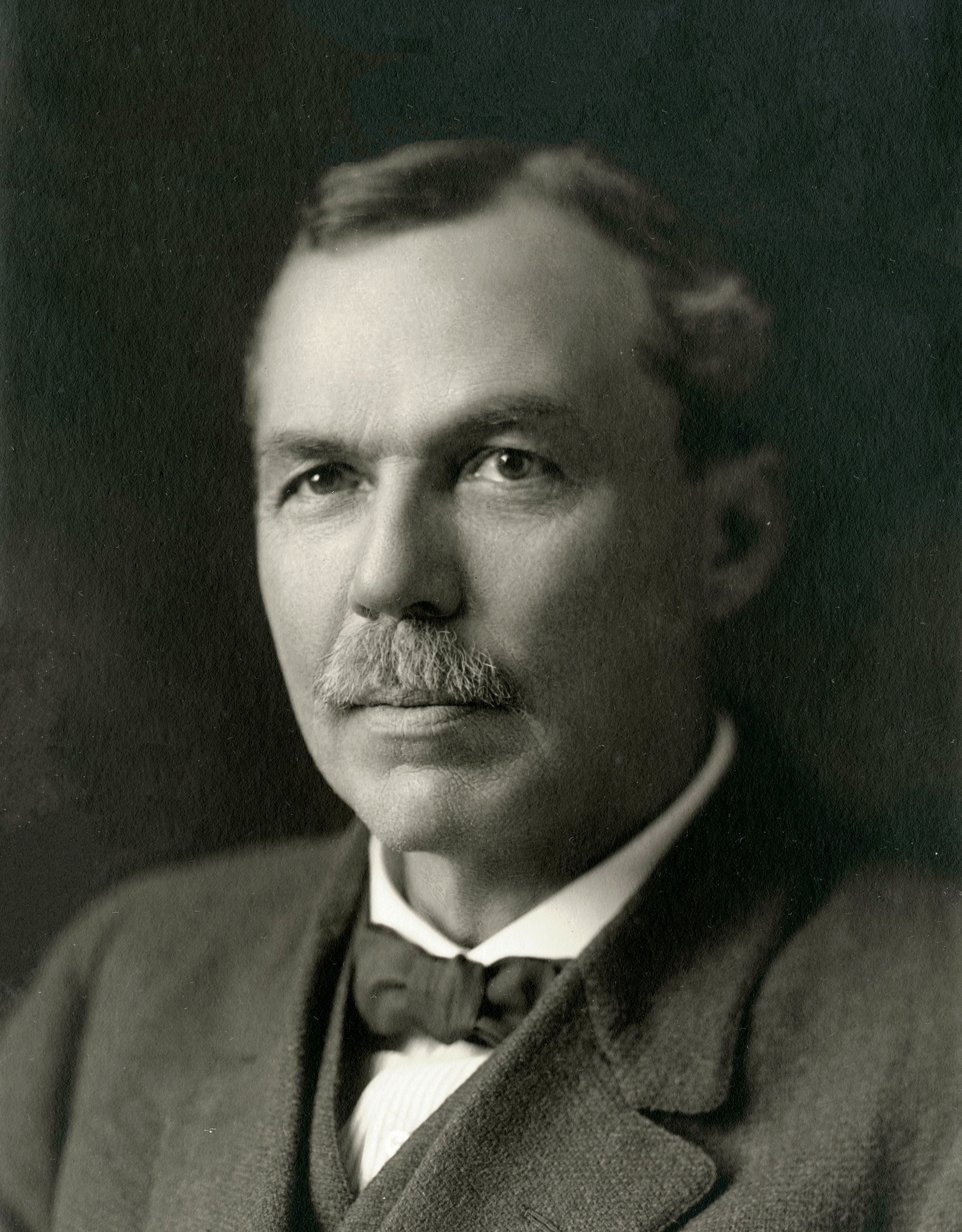
Jacob Piatt Dunn Jr., with whom Marshall wrote a proposed constitution for Indiana

Rewriting the state constitution became Marshall's central focus as governor, and after the General Assembly refused to call a constitutional convention he sought other ways to have a new constitution adopted. He and Jacob Piatt Dunn, a close friend and civic leader, wrote a new constitution that increased the state's regulatory powers considerably, set minimum wages, and gave constitutional protections to unions. Many of these reforms were also in the Socialist Party platform under its leader, Terre Haute native Eugene V. Debs. Republicans believed Marshall's constitution was an attempt to win over Debs' supporters, who had a strong presence in Indiana. The constitution also allowed direct-democracy initiatives and referendums to be held. The Democratic controlled assembly agreed to the request and put the measure on the ballot. His opponents attacked the direct-democracy provisions, claiming they were a violation of the United States Constitution, which required states to operate republican forms of government. The 1910 midterm elections gave the Democrats control of the Indiana Senate, increasing the constitution's chances of adoption. Marshall presented it to the General Assembly in 1911 and recommended that they submit it to voters in the 1912 election.

Republicans opposed the ratification process, and were infuriated that the Democrats were attempting to revise the entire constitution without calling a constitutional convention, as had been called for in the state's two previous constitutions. Marshall argued that no convention was needed because the existing constitution did not call for one. Republicans took the issue to court and the Marion County Circuit Court granted an injunction removing the constitution from the 1912 ballot. Marshall appealed, but the Indiana Supreme Court upheld the decision in a judgment which stated that the Constitution of Indiana could not be replaced in total without a constitutional convention, based on the precedent set by Indiana's first two constitutions. Marshall was angry with the decision and delivered a speech attacking the court and accusing it of overstepping its authority. He launched a final appeal to the United States Supreme Court but left office in January 1913 while the case was still pending. Later that year, the court declined the appeal, finding that the issue was within the sole jurisdiction of the state courts. Marshall was disappointed with the outcome. Subsequent scholars such as Linda Gugin and legal expert James St. Claire have called the process and the document "seriously flawed" and argued that had the constitution been adopted, large parts would probably have been ruled unconstitutional by the federal courts.

== Vice presidency (1913–1921) ==
=== Election ===
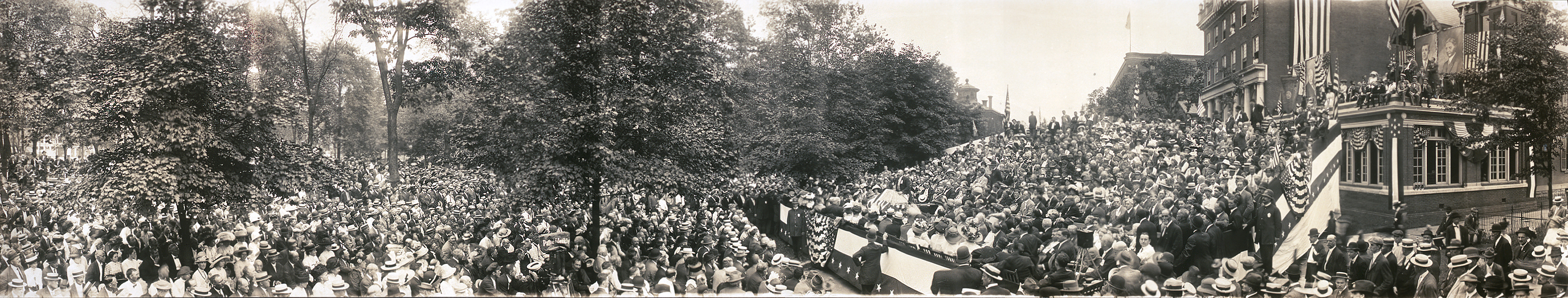
A crowd in Indianapolis listening to Samuel Ralston speak as Thomas Marshall prepares to deliver his acceptance speech for the vice presidential nomination on August 10, 1912

The Indiana constitution prevented Marshall from serving a consecutive term as governor. He made plans to run for a United States Senate seat after his term ended, but another opportunity presented itself during his last months as governor. Although he did not attend the 1912 Democratic National Convention in Baltimore, his name was put forward as Indiana's choice for president. He was suggested as a compromise nominee, but William Jennings Bryan and his delegates endorsed Woodrow Wilson over Champ Clark, securing the nomination for Wilson. Indiana's delegates lobbied to have Marshall named the vice presidential candidate in exchange for supporting Wilson. Indiana was an important swing state, and Wilson hoped that Marshall's popularity would help him carry it in the general election. He had his delegates support Marshall, giving him the vice presidential nomination. Marshall privately turned down the nomination, assuming the job would be boring given its limited role. He changed his mind after Wilson assured him that he would be given plenty of responsibilities. During the campaign, Marshall traveled across the United States delivering speeches. The Wilson–Marshall ticket easily won the 1912 election because of the division between the Republican Party and the Progressive Party.

Marshall was not fond of Wilson, as he disagreed with him on a number of issues. Although Wilson invited Marshall to cabinet meetings, Marshall's ideas were rarely considered for implementation, and Marshall eventually stopped attending them regularly. In 1913, Wilson broke with longstanding tradition and met with senators to discuss policy. Previous presidents had used the vice president as an intermediary, but Wilson did not trust Marshall with delicate business. In his memoir, Marshall's only negative comment towards Wilson was, "I have sometimes thought that great men are the bane of civilization, they are the real cause of all the bitterness and contention which amounts to anything in the world". Their relationship was described as one of "functioning animosity".

=== Senate developments ===
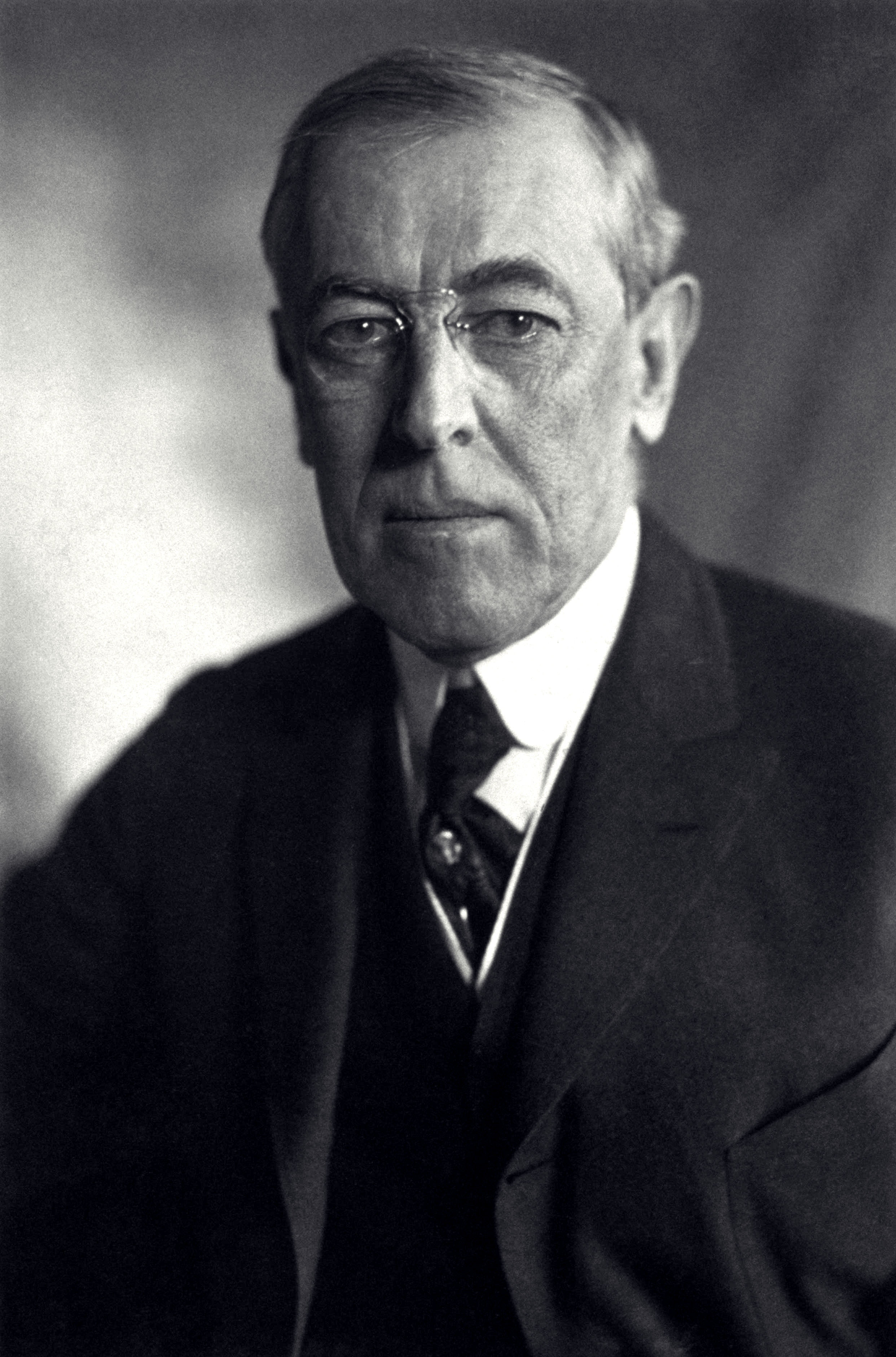
Woodrow Wilson, President of the United States

Marshall was not offended by Wilson's lack of interest in his ideas, and considered his primary constitutional duty to be in the Senate. He viewed the vice presidency as a legislative role, not an executive one. When he presided over the Senate, emotions sometimes ran high. During a debate on the Mexican border crisis in 1916, Marshall threatened to expel certain senators from the chamber for their raucous behavior, but did not carry through on the threat. On several occasions, he ordered the Senate gallery cleared. He voted eight times to break tie votes.

In the debates leading up to World War I, a number of isolationist senators filibustered bills that Wilson considered important. The filibusters lasted for weeks and twice lasted for over three months. Wilson and the bills' supporters requested that Marshall put a gag-order in place to cut off debate, but he refused on ethical grounds, allowing a number of bills to be defeated in hopes that opposition would eventually end their filibuster. Among the defeated bills was one allowing merchant ships to arm themselves, and another allowing the US government to make direct arms sales to the Allies. Despite their victories, the small group of senators continued to lock up the Senate to prevent any pro-war legislation from passing. In response, Marshall led the Senate to adopt a new rule on March 8, 1917, allowing filibusters to be broken by two-thirds of voting Senators. This replaced the previous rule that allowed any senator to prolong debate as long as he desired. The rule has been modified several times, most prominently that the current rule requires three-fifths of all Senators, not only the ones voting.

As Marshall made little news and was viewed as a somewhat comic figure in Washington because of his sense of humor, a number of Democratic party leaders wanted him removed from the 1916 reelection ticket. Wilson, after deliberating, decided keeping Marshall on would demonstrate party unity; thus in 1916 Wilson won reelection over the still divided Republican Party. Marshall became the first vice president re-elected since John C. Calhoun in 1828. Wilson and Marshall were the first president and vice president team to be re-elected since Monroe and Tompkins in 1820.

=== Assassination attempt ===
On the evening of July 2, 1915, Eric Muenter, a one time German professor at Harvard and Cornell universities, who opposed American support of the Allied war effort, broke into the U.S. Senate and, finding the door to the Senate chamber locked, laid dynamite outside the reception room, which happened to be next to Marshall's office door. Although the bomb was set with a timer, it exploded prematurely just before midnight, while no one was in the office.

On July 3, Muenter (who went under the pseudonym Frank Holt) burst into the Glen Cove, New York home of Jack Morgan, son of financier J. P. Morgan, demanding that he stop the sale of weapons to the Allies. Morgan told the man he was in no position to comply with his demand; Muenter shot him twice non-fatally and escaped. Muenter was later apprehended and confessed to attempted assassination of the vice president. Marshall was offered a personal security detachment after the incident, but declined it. Marshall had been receiving written death threats from numerous "cranks" for several weeks. "Some of them were signed," Marshall told the press, "but most were anonymous. I threw them all into the waste basket." Marshall added that he was "more or less a fatalist" and did not notify the Secret Service about the letters, "but that he naturally was startled when he heard of the explosion at the Capitol."

=== World War I ===
During Marshall's second term, the United States entered World War I. Marshall was a reluctant supporter of the war, believing the country to be unprepared and feared it would be necessary to enact conscription. (Note: Conscription was enacted shortly after war was declared.) He was pleased with Wilson's strategy to begin a military buildup before the declaration of war, and fully supported the war effort once it had begun. Shortly after the first troops began to assemble for transport to Europe, Wilson and Marshall hosted a delegation from the United Kingdom in which Marshall became privy to the primary war strategy. However, he was largely excluded from war planning and rarely received official updates on the progress of military campaigns. He usually received news of the war through the newspapers.

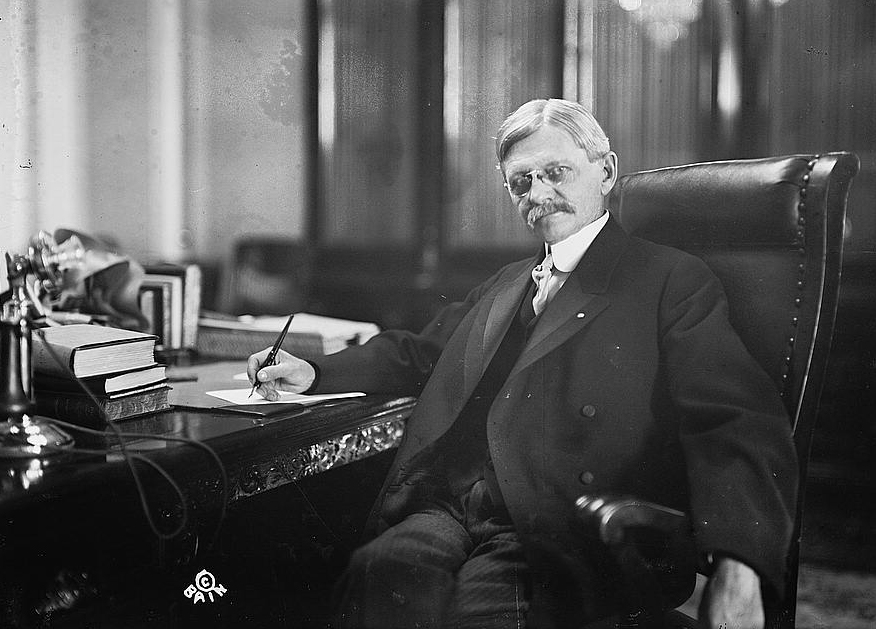
Thomas Marshall in his Senate office

Wilson sent Marshall around the nation to deliver morale-boosting speeches and encourage Americans to buy Liberty Bonds to support the war effort. Marshall was well suited for the job, as he had been earning extra money as a public speaker while vice president, and gladly accepted the responsibility. In his speeches, he cast the war as a "moral crusade to preserve the dignity of the state for the rights of individuals". In his memoir, he recalled that the war seemed to drag on "with leaden feet", and that he was relieved when it finally ended. As the war neared its end, Marshall became the first vice president to conduct cabinet meetings; Wilson left him with this responsibility while traveling in Europe to sign the Versailles treaty and to work on gathering support for his League of Nations idea. Wilson became the first president to deliver a treaty to the Senate in person when he presented it to Marshall during a morning session.

=== Morrison ===
Marshall's wife, Lois, was heavily involved in charitable activities in Washington and spent considerable time working at the Diet Kitchen Welfare Center providing free meals to impoverished children. In 1917 she became acquainted with a mother of newborn twins, one of whom was chronically ill. The child's parents were unable to get adequate treatment for their son's condition. Lois formed a close bond with the baby, named Clarence Ignatius Morrison, and offered to take him and help him find treatment. She and Marshall were unable to have children, and when she brought the baby home, Marshall told her that she could "keep him, provided he did not squall". Marshall grew to love the boy and wrote that he "never walked the streets of Washington with as sure a certainty as he walked into my heart", and, as the boy grew older, that he was "beautiful as an angel; brilliant beyond his years; lovable from every standpoint".

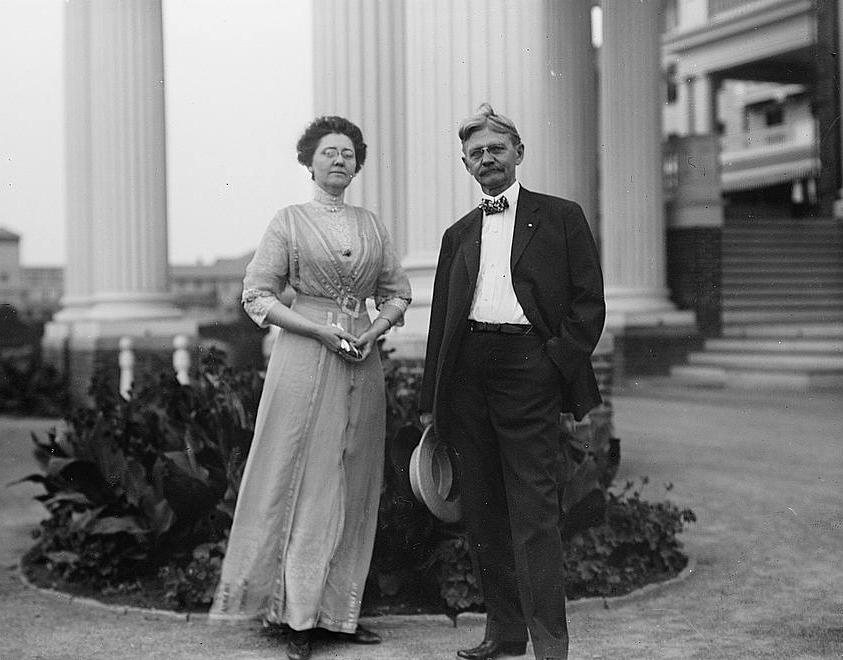
Thomas Marshall and wife Lois in Washington

The Marshalls never officially adopted Morrison because they believed that to go through the procedure while his parents were still living would appear unusual to the public. Wanting to keep the situation private, they instead made a special arrangement with his parents. (Note: Marshall arranged to provide jobs for the boy's parents at a hotel nearby the Marshall's home where they were able to frequently visit their son, who was kept in a special apartment where they could stay over with him when they chose (Bennett 2007, p. 298).) President Wilson felt obliged to acknowledge the boy as theirs and sent the couple a note that simply said, "With congratulations to the baby. Wilson". Morrison lived with the Marshalls for the rest of his life. In correspondence they referred to him as Morrison Marshall, but in person they called him Izzy. Lois took him to see many doctors and spent all her available time trying to nurse him back to health, but his condition worsened and he died in February 1920, just before his fourth birthday. His death devastated Marshall, who wrote in his memoir that Izzy "was and is and ever will be so sacred to me".

=== Succession crisis ===
President Wilson experienced a mild stroke in September 1919. On October 2, he was struck by a much more severe stroke that left him partially paralyzed and almost certainly incapacitated. Wilson's closest adviser, Joseph Tumulty, did not believe Marshall would be a suitable acting president and took precautions to prevent him from assuming presidential powers and duties. Wilson's wife Edith strongly disliked Marshall because of what she called his "uncouthed" disposition, and also opposed his assumption of presidential powers and duties. Tumulty and the First Lady believed that an official communication from Wilson's staff on his condition would allow Marshall to trigger the constitutional mechanism allowing him to become acting president, and made sure no such communication occurred. After Marshall demanded to know Wilson's status so that he could prepare for the possibility of becoming president, they had a reporter from The Baltimore Sun brief Marshall and inform him that Wilson was near death. Marshall later said that "it was the first great shock of my life", but without an official communication on Wilson's condition, he did not believe he could constitutionally assume presidential powers and duties.

On October 5, Secretary of State Robert Lansing was the first official to propose that Marshall forcibly assume presidential powers and duties. Other cabinet secretaries backed Lansing's request. Congressional leaders of both parties also sent private communications to Marshall, who was cautious in accepting their support. After consulting with his wife and his long-time personal adviser, Mark Thistlethwaite, he privately refused to assume Wilson's duties and become acting president. The process for declaring a president incapacitated was unclear at that time, and he feared the precedent that might be set if he forcibly removed Wilson from his powers and duties. Marshall wanted the president to voluntarily allow his powers to devolve to the vice president, but that was impossible given his condition and unlikely given Wilson's dislike for Marshall. The vice president informed the cabinet that he would assume Wilson's powers and duties only in response to a joint resolution of Congress calling on him to do so or an official communication from Wilson or his staff asserting his inability to perform his duties.

Wilson was kept secluded by his wife and personal physician and only his close advisers were allowed to see him; none would divulge official information on his condition. Although Marshall sought to meet with Wilson to determine his condition, he was unable to do so. He instead relied on vague updates received through bulletins published by Wilson's physician. Believing that Wilson and his advisers would not voluntarily transfer power to the vice president, a group of congressional leaders initiated Marshall's requested joint resolution. However, senators opposed to the League of Nations treaty blocked the joint resolution in hopes of preventing the treaty's ratification. These senators believed that as acting president Marshall would make several key concessions that would allow the treaty to win ratification. Wilson, in his present condition, was either unwilling or unable to make the concessions, and debate on the bill had resulted in a deadlock.

On December 4, Lansing announced in a Senate committee hearing that no one in the cabinet had spoken with or seen Wilson in over sixty days. The senators seeking to elevate Marshall requested that a committee be sent to check on Wilson's condition, hoping to gain evidence to support their cause. Dubbed the "smelling committee" by several newspapers, the group discovered Wilson was in very poor health, but seemed to have recovered enough of his faculties to make decisions. Their report ended the perceived need for the joint resolution.

At a Sunday church service in mid-December, in what Marshall believed was an attempt by other officials to force him to assume the presidency, a courier brought a message informing him that Wilson had died. Marshall was shocked, and rose to announce the news to the congregation. The ministers held a prayer, the congregation began singing hymns, and many people wept. Marshall and his wife exited the building, and made a call to the White House to determine his next course of action, only to find that he had been the victim of a hoax, and that Wilson was still alive.

Marshall performed a few ceremonial functions for the remainder of Wilson's term, such as hosting foreign dignitaries. Among these was Albert I, King of the Belgians, the first European monarch to visit the United States. Edward, Prince of Wales, the future monarch of the United Kingdom, spent two days with Marshall and received a personal tour of Washington from him. First Lady Edith Wilson performed most routine duties of government. She reviewed Wilson's communications and decided what to share with him and what to delegate to others. The resulting lack of leadership allowed the administration's opponents to prevent ratification of the League of Nations treaty. They attacked the treaty's tenth article, which they believed would allow the United States to be bound in an alliance to European countries that could force the country to return to war without an act of Congress. Marshall personally supported the treaty's adoption, but recommended several changes, including the requirement that all parties to it acknowledge the Monroe Doctrine and the United States' sphere of influence, and that the tenth article be made non-binding.

Wilson began to recover by the end of 1919, but remained secluded for the remainder of his term, steadfast in his refusal or inability to accept changes to the treaty. Marshall was prevented from meeting with him to ascertain his true condition until his final day in office. It remains unclear who made executive decisions during Wilson's incapacity, but it was likely the first lady with the help of the presidential advisers.

== Post-vice presidency (1921–1925) ==
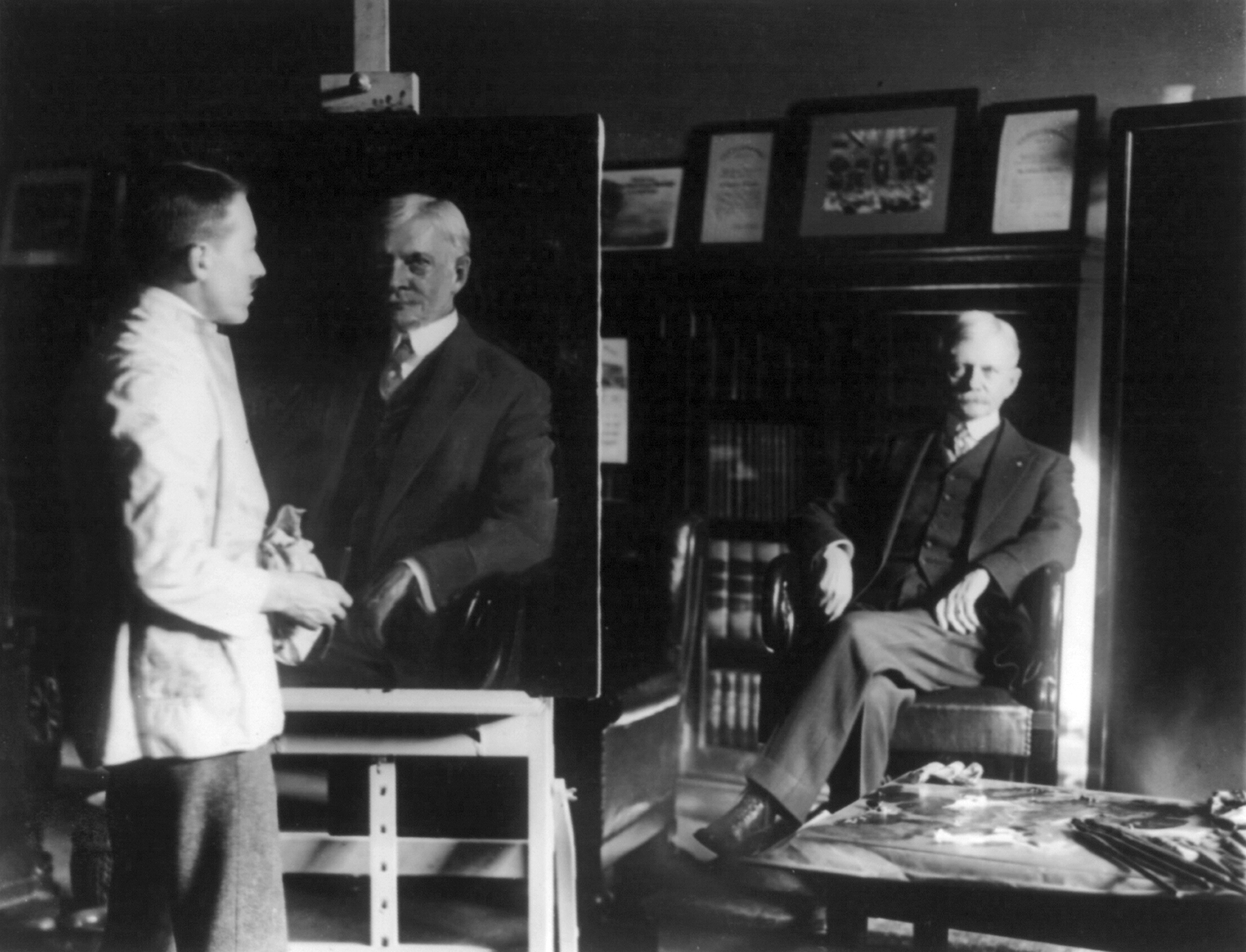
U.S. Vice President Thomas R. Marshall having his portrait painted by an unidentified artist, 1920

Marshall had his name entered as a candidate for the presidential nomination at the 1920 Democratic National Convention. He made arrangements with Thomas Taggart to have a delegation sent from Indiana to support his bid, but was unable to garner support outside of the Hoosier delegation. Ultimately he endorsed the Democratic nominees, James M. Cox for president and Franklin D. Roosevelt for vice president, but they were defeated by the Republican ticket of Warren G. Harding and Calvin Coolidge. On their election, Marshall sent a note to Coolidge offering him his "sincere condolences" for his misfortune of having been elected vice president. During his retirement, Marshall gravitated towards conservatism; declaring his opposition to various progressive measures such as the fixing of minimum wages.

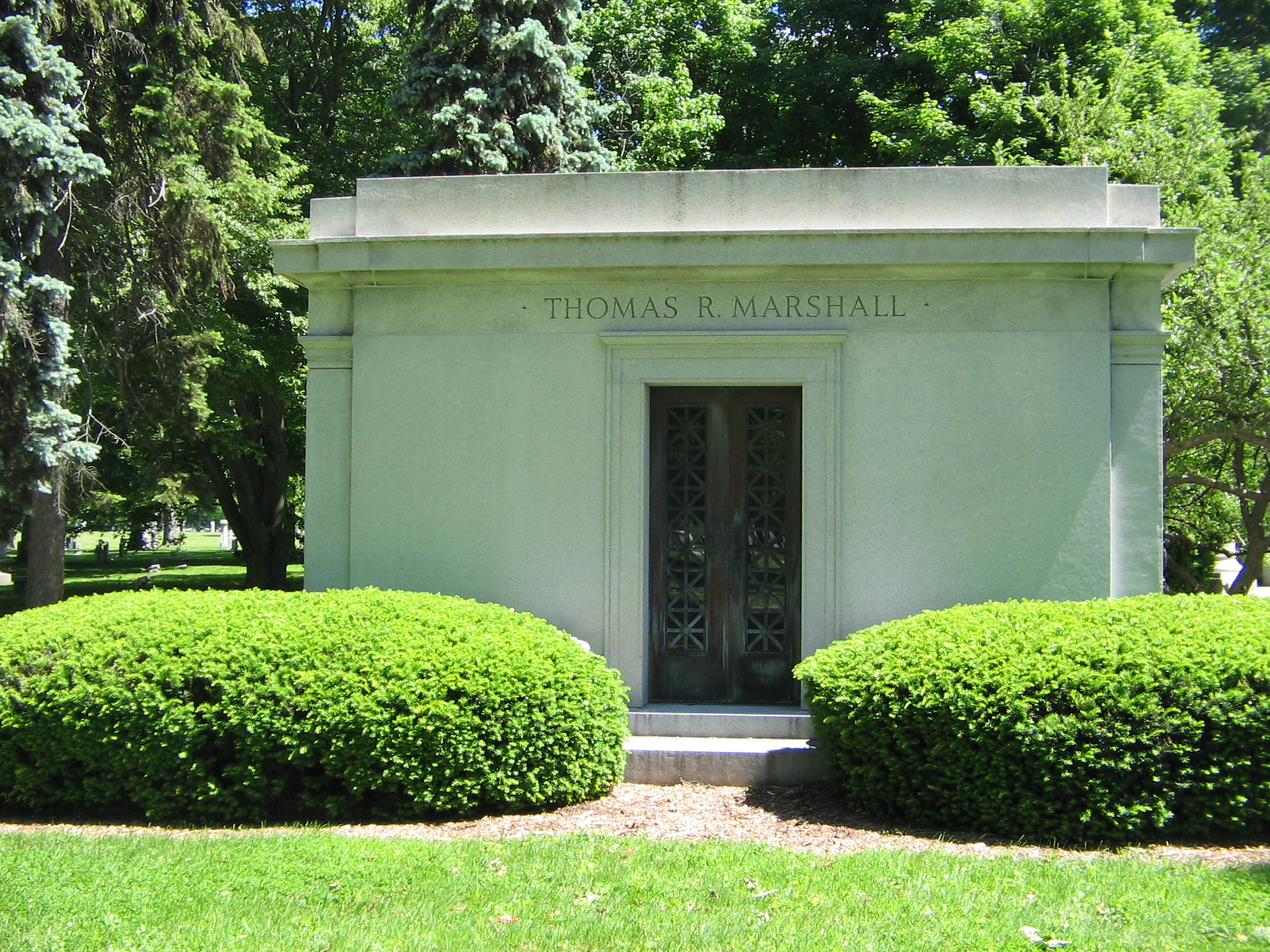
Thomas R. Marshall's family burial plot in Crown Hill Cemetery, Indianapolis, Indiana

Marshall considered returning to Columbia City after leaving office, but instead bought a home and opened a law practice in Indianapolis, where he believed there would be better business opportunities. Harding nominated him to serve on the Lincoln Memorial Commission in 1921, and then to a more lucrative position on the Federal Coal Commission in 1922; Marshall resigned from both commissions in 1923. He spent over a year writing books on the law and his Recollections, a humorous memoir. The latter book was completed in May 1925 and subsequent historians have noted it as unusual, even for its time, for not disclosing any secrets or attacking any of Marshall's enemies. Marshall remained a popular public speaker, and continued to travel to give speeches. The last he delivered was to high school students in the town of his birth.

=== Death ===
On June 1, 1925, Marshall and his wife were on a trip to Washington, D.C., when he died suddenly from a heart attack at his room at the Willard Hotel, while reading his Bible in bed. He had been unwell for several days, and a nurse had accompanied them on the trip, but Marshall had already died by the time his wife could summon help. He was 71.

A service and viewing was held in Washington two days later and was attended by many dignitaries. Marshall's remains were returned to Indianapolis, where he lay in state for two days; thousands visited his bier. His funeral service was held June 9, and he was interred in Crown Hill Cemetery, next to the grave of his "adopted" son Morrison "Izzy" Marshall. Lois Marshall moved to Arizona and remained widowed the rest of her life, living on her husband's pension and the $50,000 she earned by selling his memoir to the Bobbs-Merrill publishing company. She died in 1958 and was interred next to her husband.

== Humor ==
Marshall was known for his quick wit and good sense of humor. On hearing of his nomination as vice president, he announced that he was not surprised, as "Indiana is the mother of Vice Presidents; home of more second-class men than any other state". One of his favorite jokes, which he delivered in a speech before his departure for Washington, D.C., to become vice president, recounted a story of a man with two sons. One of the sons went to sea and drowned and the other was elected vice president; neither son was ever heard from again. On his election as vice president, he sent Woodrow Wilson a book, inscribed "From your only Vice."

Marshall's humor caused him trouble during his time in Washington. He was known to greet citizens walking by his office on the White House tour by saying to them, "If you look on me as a wild animal, be kind enough to throw peanuts at me." This prompted Wilson to move Marshall's office to the Senate Office building, where the Vice President would not be disturbed by visitors. In response to Alexander Graham Bell's proposal to the board of the Smithsonian Institution to send a team to excavate for ruins in Guatemala, Marshall suggested that the team instead excavate around Washington. When asked why, he replied that, judging by the looks of the people walking on the street, they should be able to find buried cave-men no more than six feet down. The joke was not well received, and he was shut out of board meetings for nearly a year.

Marshall's wit is best remembered for a phrase he introduced to the American lexicon. While presiding over a Senate session in 1914, Marshall responded to earlier comments from Senator Joseph L. Bristow that provided a long list of what he felt the country needed. Marshall reportedly leaned over and muttered to one of his clerks, "What this country needs is more of this; what this country needs is more of that" and quipped loudly enough for others to overhear, "What this country needs is a really good five-cent cigar." (Note: The earliest newspaper article describing Marshall's five-cent cigar remark appeared in Fred C. Kelly's "Statesmen, Real and Near" column in the February 6, 1914, issue of the Washington Herald. (Harstad 2014, p. 48.) Five cents is equivalent to $1.61 in 2025.) Marshall's remark was popularized and widely circulated among a network of newspapers. Other accounts later embellished the story, including the exact situation that prompted his comment. (Note: Accounts of the exact date, text, and circumstances of Marshall's five-cent cigar remarks are inconsistent, and no first-hand accounts of the event have been located. (Harstad 2014, pp. 48, 52, 54.)) In 1922 Marshall explained that the five-cent cigar was a metaphor for simpler times and "buckling down to thrift and work".

== Legacy ==
The situation that arose after the incapacity of Wilson, for which Marshall's vice-presidency is most remembered, revived the national debate on the process of presidential succession. The topic was already being discussed when Wilson left for Europe, which influenced him to allow Marshall to conduct cabinet meetings in his absence. Wilson's incapacity during 1919 and the lack of action by Marshall made it a major issue. The lack of a clear process for presidential succession had first become an issue when President William Henry Harrison died in office in 1841, but little progress had been made passing a constitutional amendment to remedy the problem. Nearly fifty years later, after the assassination of John F. Kennedy, the Twenty-fifth Amendment to the United States Constitution was passed, allowing the vice president to assume the presidential powers and duties any time the president was rendered incapable of carrying out the powers and duties of the office.

Historians have varied interpretations of Marshall's vice presidency. Claire Suddath rated Marshall as one of the worst vice presidents in American history in a 2008 Time magazine article. Samuel Eliot Morison wrote that had Marshall carried out his constitutional duties, assumed the presidential powers and duties, and made the concessions necessary for the passage of the League of Nations treaty in late 1920, the United States would have been much more involved in European affairs and could have helped prevent the rise of Adolf Hitler, which began in the following year. Morison and a number of other historians claim that Marshall's decision was an indirect cause of the Second World War. Charles Thomas, one of Marshall's biographers, wrote that although Marshall's assumption of presidential powers and duties would have made World War II much less likely, modern hypothetical speculation on the subject was unfair to Marshall, who made the correct decision in not forcibly removing Wilson from his duties, even temporarily.

The World War II Liberty ship SS Thomas R. Marshall was named in his honor.

== Electoral history ==
State prosecutor for northeastern Indiana, 1880
| Party | Candidate | Votes | % |
|---|---|---|---|
| Republican | Elijah Jackson | 5,594 | 52.7 |
| Democratic | Thomas R. Marshall | 5,023 | 47.3 |

Indiana gubernatorial election, 1908
| Party | Candidate | Votes | % |
|---|---|---|---|
| Democratic | Thomas R. Marshall | 348,439 | 49.5 |
| Republican | James E. Watson | 338,262 | 48.0 |
| Prohibition | Samuel W. Haynes | 15,926 | 2.3 |
| Populist | F.J.S. Robinson | 986 | 0.1 |

1912 United States presidential election

Electoral results
| Presidential candidate | Party | Home state | Popular vote | | Electoral vote | Running mate | | |
| Presidential candidate | Party | Home state | Count | Percentage | Electoral vote | Vice-presidential candidate | Home state | Electoral vote |
|---|---|---|---|---|---|---|---|---|
| Thomas Woodrow Wilson | Democratic | New Jersey | 6,296,284 | 41.8% | 435 | Thomas Riley Marshall | Indiana | 435 |
| Theodore Roosevelt | Progressive | New York | 4,122,721 | 27.4% | 88 | Hiram Warren Johnson | California | 88 |
| William Howard Taft | Republican | Ohio | 3,486,242 | 23.2% | 8 | Nicholas Murray Butler | New York | 8 |
| Eugene Victor Debs | Socialist | Indiana | 901,551 | 6.0% | 0 | Emil Seidel | Wisconsin | 0 |
| Eugene Wilder Chafin | Prohibition | Illinois | 208,156 | 1.4% | 0 | Aaron Sherman Watkins | Ohio | 0 |
| Arthur Elmer Reimer | Socialist Labor | Massachusetts | 29,324 | 0.2% | 0 | August Gilhaus | New York | 0 |
| Other | | | 4,556 | 0.0% | — | Other | | — |
| Total | | | 15,048,834 | 100% | 531 | | | 531 |
| Needed to win | | | | | 266 | | | 266 |

1916 United States presidential election

Electoral results
| Presidential candidate | Party | Home state | Popular vote | | Electoral vote | Running mate | | |
| Presidential candidate | Party | Home state | Count | Percentage | Electoral vote | Vice-presidential candidate | Home state | Electoral vote |
|---|---|---|---|---|---|---|---|---|
| Woodrow Wilson | Democratic | New Jersey | 9,126,868 | 49.2% | 277 | Thomas Riley Marshall | Indiana | 277 |
| Charles Evans Hughes | Republican | New York | 8,548,728 | 46.1% | 254 | Charles Warren Fairbanks | Indiana | 254 |
| Allan Louis Benson | Socialist | New York | 590,524 | 3.2% | 0 | George Ross Kirkpatrick | New Jersey | 0 |
| James Franklin Hanly | Prohibition | Indiana | 221,302 | 1.2% | 0 | Ira Landrith | Tennessee | 0 |
| Other | | | 49,163 | 0.3% | — | Other | | — |
| Total | | | 18,536,585 | 100% | 531 | | | 531 |
| Needed to win | | | | | 266 | | | 266 |

== Primary sources ==
- Marshall, Thomas R. (1925). Recollections. Bobbs-Merrill.

Political offices
| Preceded by Frank Hanly | Governor of Indiana; 1909–1913 | Succeeded by Samuel M. Ralston |
| Preceded by James S. Sherman | Vice President of the United States; 1913–1921 | Succeeded by Calvin Coolidge |
Party political offices
| Preceded by John W. Kern | Democratic nominee for Governor of Indiana; 1908 | Succeeded by Samuel M. Ralston |
| Preceded by John W. Kern | Democratic nominee for Vice President of the United States; 1912, 1916 | Succeeded by Franklin D. Roosevelt |
