= SS Thomas R. Marshall =

Liberty ship of WWII

History

United States
- Name: William Strong, before 14 October 1942; Thomas R. Marshall, renamed 14 October 1942
- Namesake: William Strong; Thomas R. Marshall
- Owner: War Shipping Administration (WSA)
- Operator: American Foreign Steamship Corp.
- Ordered: as type (EC2-S-C1) hull, MCE hull 933
- Awarded: 30 January 1942
- Builder: Bethlehem-Fairfield Shipyard, Baltimore, Maryland
- Cost: $1,075,897
- Yard number: 2083
- Way number: 3
- Laid down: 7 December 1942
- Launched: 15 January 1943
- Completed: 28 January 1943
- Identification: Call sign: KKGB
- Fate: Laid up in Reserve Fleet, 22 October 1945, sold for scrap 12 March 1971

General characteristics
- Class & type: Liberty ship; type EC2-S-C1, standard
- Tonnage: 10,865 LT DWT; 7,176 GRT
- Displacement: 3,380 long tons (3,434 t) (light); 14,245 long tons (14,474 t) (max)
- Length: 441 feet 6 inches (135 m) oa; 416 feet (127 m) pp; 427 feet (130 m) lwl
- Beam: 57 feet (17 m)
- Draft: 27 ft 9.25 in (8.4646 m)
- Installed power: 2 × Oil fired 450 °F (232 °C) boilers, operating at 220 psi (1,500 kPa); 2,500 hp (1,900 kW)
- Propulsion: 1 × triple-expansion steam engine, (manufactured by Vulcan Iron Works, Wilkes-Barre, Pennsylvania); 1 × screw propeller
- Speed: 11.5 knots (21.3 km/h; 13.2 mph)
- Capacity: 562,608 cubic feet (15,931 m^{3}) (grain); 499,573 cubic feet (14,146 m^{3}) (bale)
- Complement: 38–62 USMM; 21–40 USNAG
- Armament: Varied by ship; Bow-mounted 3-inch (76 mm)/50-caliber gun; Stern-mounted 4-inch (102 mm)/50-caliber gun; 2–8 × single 20-millimeter (0.79 in) Oerlikon anti-aircraft (AA) cannons and/or, 2–8 × 37-millimeter (1.46 in) M1 AA guns

SS Thomas R. Marshall was a Liberty ship built in the United States during World War II. She was named after Thomas R. Marshall, the 28th vice president of the United States from 1913 to 1921 under President Woodrow Wilson. He had been a prominent lawyer in Indiana, becoming active in the Democratic Party by stumping across the state for other candidates and later becoming the 27th governor of Indiana from 1909 to 1913.

== Construction ==
Thomas R. Marshall was laid down on 7 December 1942, under a Maritime Commission (MARCOM) contract, MCE hull 933, by the Bethlehem-Fairfield Shipyard, Baltimore, Maryland; and launched on 15 January 1943.

== History ==
She was allocated to the American Foreign Steamship Corp., on 28 January 1943.

On 9 December 1949, she was laid up in the National Defense Reserve Fleet, in Mobile, Alabama. On 9 September 1971, she was sold for $35,424.54, to Union Minerals & Alloys Corp., to be scrapped. On 15 September 1971, she was withdrawn from the fleet.

== Bibliography ==
- "Bethlehem-Fairfield, Baltimore MD". www.ShipbuildingHistory.com. 7 August 2021.
- Maritime Administration. "Thomas R. Marshall". Ship History Database Vessel Status Card. U.S. Department of Transportation, Maritime Administration.
- Davies, James (May 2004). "Specifications (As-Built)" (PDF). p. 23.
- "SS Thomas R. Marshall".
