= Sarah T. Bolton (relief) =

Public artwork by Emma Sangernebo

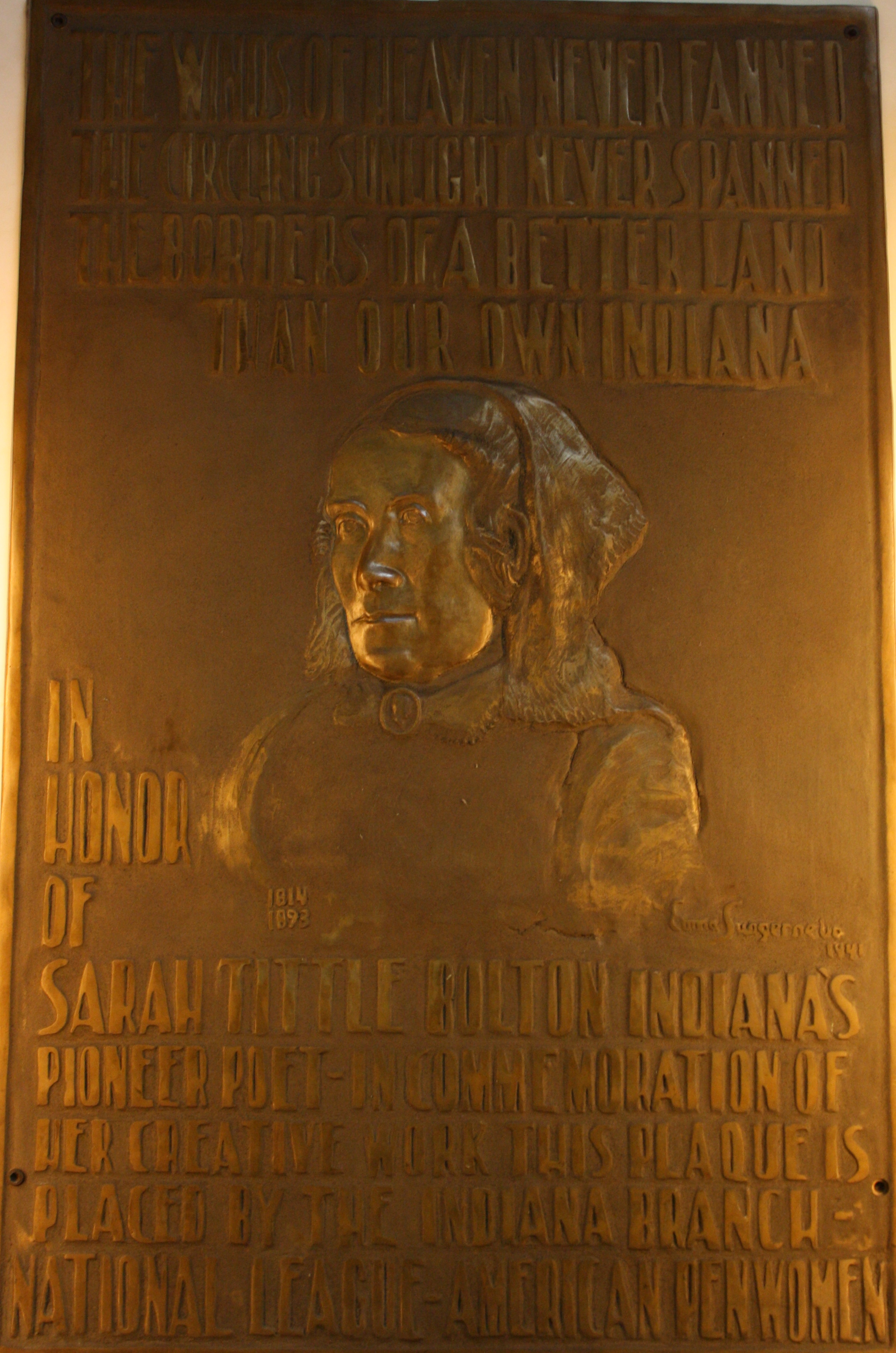
- Artist: Emma Sangernebo
- Year: 1941
- Dimensions: 120 cm (49 in × 31 1/8 in)
- Location: Indiana State House, Indianapolis, Indiana, United States; 39.768611°N 86.1625°W
- Owner: State of Indiana

Sarah T. Bolton is a public artwork by American artist Emma Sangernebo (1877–1969). It is located on the second floor of the rotunda in the Indiana State House in Indianapolis, Indiana, United States. It is a bronze sculptural relief of Indiana poet Sarah Tittle Bolton, née Barrett (December 18, 1814 – August 4, 1893) and contains four lines from Bolton's poem "Indiana".

== Description ==
Sarah T. Bolton is a cast bronze relief. The portrait of Bolton occupies the middle ground of the plaque and depicts her in a ¾ view. In the upper left corner of the plaque are four lines from Bolton's poem "Indiana". Below the portrait is the plaque's dedication. Sangernebo's signature and the year 1941 are below the portrait to the right.

The broad face is free of lines and wrinkles, and the features of her eyes, nose, and mouth are finely rendered. Her hair is parted in the center with a single pin-curl at her temple. A fringed cap rests half-way back on her head and is folded behind her ear. There is a cameo at her throat, and the collar is fringed. Her shawl and bodice are plain and without definition or folds. Under the right breast are Bolton's life dates, 1814–1893.

At the top of the relief are four lines from Bolton's poem "Indiana":

The Winds of heaven never fanned

The circling sunlight never spanned
The Borders of a better land

Than our own Indiana.

Below the portrait is the dedication:

In Honor of Sarah Tittle Bolton Indiana's

Pioneer Poet – in commemoration of
Her creative work this plaque is
Placed by the Indiana Branch –

National League – American Penwomen.

The plaque is 49 inches (120 cm) tall, 31 1/8 inches (79 cm) wide, and approximately 3/4 inch (1.9 cm) deep. The ground of the relief is dull and has a pebbled surface. The face and letter fronts have a polished, shiny patina. The relief is mounted to the wall with four socket cap screws, one in each upper corner and one on each side approximately six inches from the bottom. The right side screw is missing. The Indiana State Museum reported on May 15, 2006, that the sculpture's condition was excellent.

== Historical information ==
Olive Inez Downing (c. 1888–1963) proposed that the Indiana Branch of the National League of American Pen Women commission a sculpture honoring Bolton and arrange to install in the State House. Bolton was known as the "Pioneer Poet Laureate of Indiana". Her poems are published in Poems (1865), Life and Poems of Sarah Tittle Bolton (1880), and Songs of a Lifetime (1892). Her most well known poem is “Paddle Your Own Canoe”.

Emma Sangernebo, née Elyes (1877–1969), was a well-known local artist trained at Herron Art School in Indianapolis. She was both a sculptor and painter. A member of the National League of American Pen Women, she was awarded the commission. Sangernebo based the sculpture on a photograph of Bolton that had appeared in Bolton's Life and Poems of Sarah Tittle Bolton. She completed the sculpture in Chicago where it was also cast.

The sculpture was installed on October 18, 1941, in the northeast niche on the second floor of the State House rotunda where it remains today. At the dedication ceremony, Bolton Mann, Bolton's great-great-grandson, unveiled the relief sculpture. Walter Flandorf (1893–1949), husband of Vera Sangernebo (1902–2001), the daughter of Emma and Alexander Sangernebo, put Bolton's "Paddle Your Own Canoe" to music.

== See also ==
- Frances Elizabeth Willard (plaque)
- Plaque Commemorating First Formal Religious Service, Indianapolis (Howard Petty)
