= Plaque Commemorating First Formal Religious Service, Indianapolis (Howard Petty) =

Public artwork by Howard Petty

Plaque Commemorating First Formal Religious Service in Indianapolis
- Artist: Howard Petty
- Year: 1923
- Type: Bronze
- Dimensions: 90 cm × 56 cm (35.5 in × 22 in)
- Location: Indianapolis; 39°46′7.5″N 86°9′45.5″W

Plaque Commemorating First Formal Religious Service (Indianapolis, IN), is a public artwork by American artist Howard Petty, located on the Indiana Statehouse, in Indianapolis. It was created in 1923 and set in the statehouse in 1924. It commemorates the first religious services held in Indianapolis in 1819 and the first organized church in 1821. The plaque is made of bronze and depicts a walnut tree in the foreground with a log cabin in the background. It is approximately 22 inches (560 mm) wide by 35.5 inches (900 mm) high and has a depth of .75 inches (19 mm).

== Description ==
The bronze plaque is approximately 22 inches (560 mm) wide by 35.5 inches (900 mm) high and has a depth of .75 inches (19 mm). The plaque is divided into three parts: text, image, text. At the top of the plaque is a raised inscription in all caps, "The First Formal Religious Service Indianapolis Was Held On These Grounds" A raised line divides this text from the top of a walnut tree. The tree's leaves cover the entire width of the plaque and are one third of the image. Directly under the tree, in the background, is the lower half of a log cabin. Three adults with three children are entering the log cabin from the proper left. On the proper right of the cabin, also in the background, is a row of trees. The trunk of the walnut tree goes directly down the center of the plaque, dividing two pieces of text (in similar font as the first). On the proper right of the tree trunk is written, "1819 Resin Hammond A Methodist Conducted the First Religious Service Under a Walnut Tree". On the proper left of the tree trunk is written, "1821 First Church Organized in the Isaac Wilson Log Cabin by Reverend William Cravens" There is another raised line dividing the plaque and "Presented 1924 by Members of the Meridian Street Methodist Episcopal Church Formerly Wesley Chapel" is inscribed. It is signed Howard Petty, 1923 in the very bottom proper left corner.

== Historical Information ==
The plaque was suggested by Mrs. John N. Carey, a member of the Meridian Street Methodist Church, chairman of the Committee on the Commemoration of the Indiana Society of Pioneers, and the founder of the Children's Museum of Indianapolis. She wanted a memorial marker to be designed specifically for the Indiana statehouse.

A contest was held and a prize of one hundred dollars was given to the winner, Howard Petty. Petty was a Clinton County resident who studied at the Herron School of Art. The plaque was placed on the west side of the north wall in the rotunda on December 14, 1924. Senator Albert J. Beveridge made the key speech, but Charles E. Coffin (president of the Meridian Street Methodist's board of trustees and president of Indianapolis' board of Public Works), Mrs. Carey, and Dr. Virgil E. Rover (pastor of the church) also spoke. The latter ended his speech as follows: "We of this generation give this memorial to our posterity to be a valued record preserving in concise and imperishable form an account of the glorious service rendered our Christianity and our country by these pioneer preachers and heroic people. 'Though the pathfinders die, the paths remain open'". Music for the dedication ceremony was provided by the church quartet, who sang "By the Rivers of Babylon" and the church organist, who played "Pomp and Circumstance".

The imagery in the plaque directly references the history of the Methodists history in Indianapolis. The first formal religious service was held outside under a walnut tree. The tree was located at the south end of the current statehouse. The first church was established in the log cabin of Isaac Wilson, who was one of the original settlers of Indianapolis and owned the local sawmill. This church was known as Wesley Chapel and was torn down in 1846 to build another chapel on that same site.

Cravens came to Indianapolis in 1821, the year the city was founded. As stated in the Indiana United Methodist Historical Society Newsletter, "On October 9th, the first sermon was preached by Reverend Cravens...and the following day lots were made available for sale. The timing was identical. Methodism was here when the city was born." He came from Virginia and was well known for his dislike of slavery and drinking. Cravens was described as, "a man of respectable talents [who] possessed a world of wit, good common sense, and was one of the most undaunted men that ever lived." Cravens sermons were written specifically to make parishioners feel uneasy. For example, he described those who rented their slaves to others (instead of utilizing the labor for their own land) as, "bloodstained hypocrites who were worse than actual slave holders, who treated their slaves kindly." Reverend Craven remained in Indianapolis for four years. As Meridian Street United Methodist historian, Daniel F. Evans noted, "Considering Cravens' aversion to drinking spirits, the plaque seems appropriately placed, since next to it is another which commemorates an 1879 meeting of the Women's Christian Temperance Union".

== See also ==
- Frances Elizabeth Willard (Taft)
