= Sarah T. Bolton =

American journalist (1814 -1893)

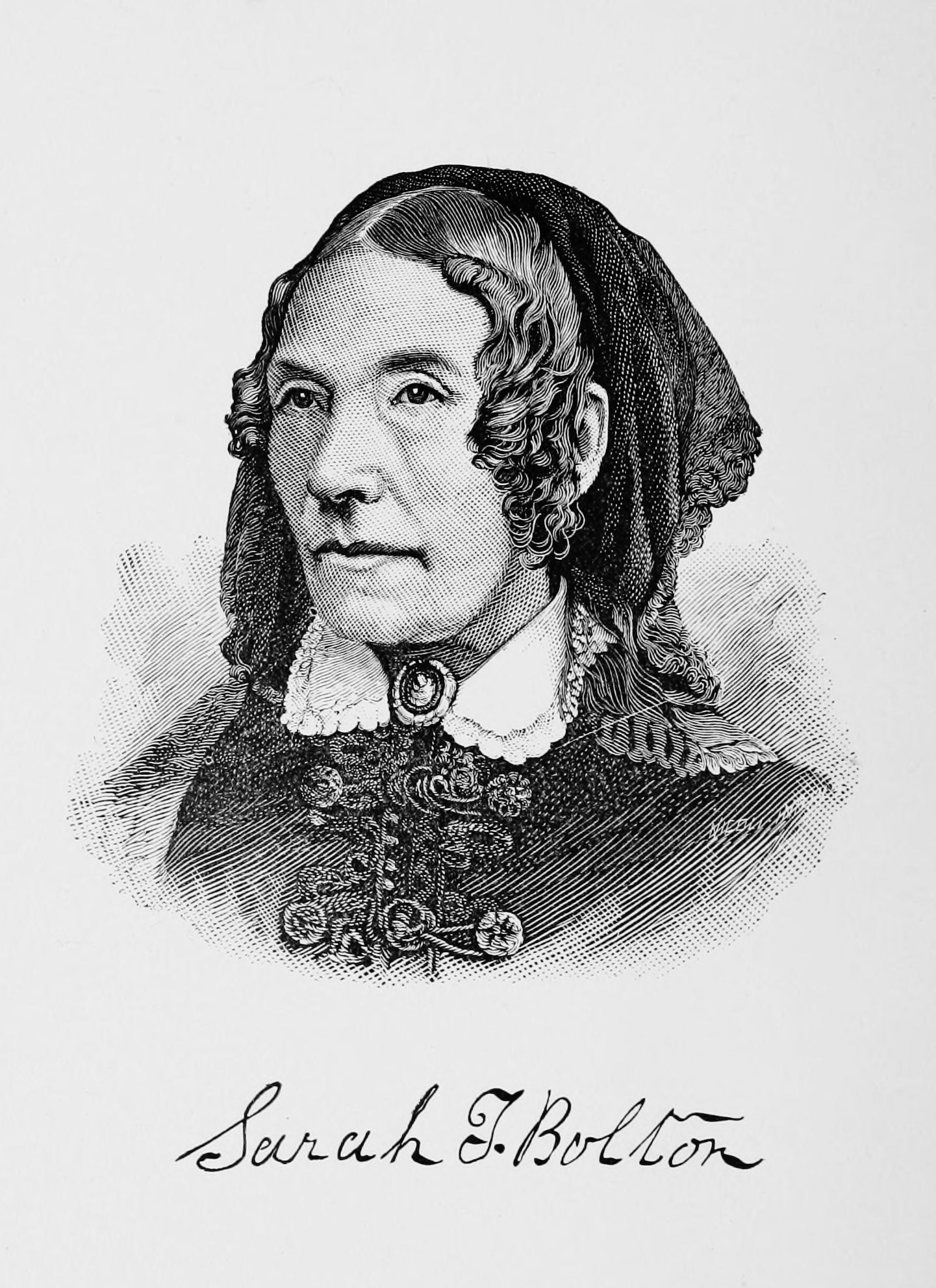
- Engraving by John Sartain, Philadelphia
- Born: Sarah Tittle Barrett; December 18, 1814; Newport Barracks, Kentucky, US
- Died: August 4, 1893 (aged 78); Indianapolis, Indiana, US
- Resting place: Crown Hill Cemetery, Indianapolis
- Occupation: Poet
- Spouse(s): Nathaniel Bolton (m. 1831-58); Judge Addison Reese (m. 1863)
- Children: Sarah Adah "Sally" (Bolton) Smith; James Pendleton Bolton
- Writing career
- Language: English
- Notable work: "Paddle Your Own Canoe"

Sarah Tittle Bolton née Barrett (December 18, 1814 – August 4, 1893) was an American poet and women's rights activist who is considered an unofficial poet laureate of Indiana. Bolton collaborated with Robert Dale Owen during Indiana's 1850–1851 constitutional convention to include the recognition of women's property rights in the revised state constitution of 1851. Bolton was little known outside of Indiana, and her writings have been mostly forgotten. "Paddle Your Own Canoe" (1850), her most famous poem, and "Indiana," a poetic tribute to her longtime home, are among her best-known poems.

== Early life and education ==
Sarah Tittle Barrett was born on December 18, 1814, in Newport Barracks, Kentucky. She was one of Esther (Pendleton) and Jonathan Belcher Barrett's six children. Sarah was named for her paternal grandmother, Sarah (Tuttle) Barrett. Lemuel Barrett, her paternal grandfather, served in the Maryland militia during the American Revolutionary War. James Pendleton, her maternal grandfather, was a cousin of President James Madison.

The Barrett family moved to Indiana when Sarah was a child around the age of three and settled on a farmstead in an area that was mostly wilderness in Jennings County, near present-day Vernon, Indiana. In 1823, when Sarah was around the age of nine, her father moved the family from their isolated farm to Madison, Indiana, so that the children could attend local schools.

Sarah Barrett learned to read and write while attending school in Madison. She also began to write poetry at an early age. At the age of thirteen her first published poem appeared in the Madison Banner. As a young woman she became a regular contributor of poems to newspapers in Madison, Indiana, and Cincinnati, Ohio. Her poems attracted the attention of Nathaniel Bolton (July 25, 1803 – November 26, 1858), who was also coeditor of the Indianapolis Gazette, the first newspaper published in Indianapolis, Indiana.

== Marriage and family ==
Sarah Barrett married Nathaniel Bolton on October 15, 1831. The couple immediately moved to Indianapolis, where Sarah gained a wide reputation as a poet while her husband was editor at the Indianapolis Democrat and State Gazette, the new name of the Indianapolis Gazette. The Boltons also purchased a farm at Mount Jackson, which was a short distance west of Indianapolis along the National Road (present-day West Washington Street). When financial difficulties forced the Boltons to return to the farm on a full-time basis, they operated their farmhouse as a public tavern. It soon became a gathering place and social hub for state legislators and others.

The Boltons were the parents of two children, Sarah Adah "Sally" and James Pendleton. In addition to running the tavern with her husband and caring for the family, she continued to write poetry. In 1845 the Boltons sold their farm to the State of Indiana as the site for what became known as the Indiana Hospital for the Insane, later renamed Central State Hospital.

From 1851 to 1854 Nathaniel Bolton served as state librarian, and in 1854 he became clerk of a U.S. Senate committee in Washington, D.C. In 1855 President Franklin Pierce appointed him as U.S. Consul to Geneva, Switzerland. Sarah Bolton accompanied her husband to Europe. While Nathaniel conducted diplomatic duties in Switzerland Sarah traveled with their daughter. Ill health forced Nathaniel to resign after two years of diplomatice service and the family . During this time Sarah acted as a correspondent for the Cincinnati Commercial. they returned to Indianapolis in 1858. He died a few months after their return to Indiana.

Following the death of her daughter, Bolton helped care for her young grandson, Bolton Smith, who received his early education in Switzerland. After Bolton Smith's return to the United States, he became a lawyer and investment banker, as well as active at the national level with the Boy Scouts of America in Washington, D.C. The early deaths of her daughter and first husband inspired Bolton's poem, "Two Graves."

On September 15, 1863, five years after the death of her first husband, Sarah Bolton married Judge Addison Reese, of Canton, Missouri. The couple lived in Missouri for two years, but she found the climate unhealthy and returned to Indianapolis. Afterward, she only used the surname of Reese for business and legal matters, retaining the surname of Bolton for other purposes. After the failure of her second marriage, Bolton traveled in Europe for several years, including two years in residence at Dresden, Germany, before returning to Indiana, where she spent the remaining years of her life.

== Career ==
During her first marriage Sarah Bolton continued to write poetry in addition to running the family's household and helping in her husband's publishing office. After the sale of the family farm at Mount Jackson in 1845 and Nathaniel Bolton's appointment as state librarian in 1851, the Boltons returned to Indianapolis, where Sarah continued to write poetry and became an active supporter of women's property rights. Nathaniel also became involved in civic and government affairs.

Sarah Bolton became a well-known poet in Indiana, eventually becoming the state's unofficial poet laureate. However, despite the acclaim that Bolton received in her home state, she was not widely known elsewhere. Bolton's poems appeared in newspapers and periodicals such as Harper's Weekly, but her literary work was not always attributed to her by name.

Over the years Bolton's writings were mostly forgotten. Two of her best-known poems are "Indiana," a poetic tribute to her longtime home, and "Paddle Your Own Canoe." Bolton typically received little to no compensation for her work, although the Cincinnati Commercial once paid $15 for three of her poems. Several collections of her poetry were also published. Poems (New York, 1865) was Bolton's first collection of poetry, followed by The Life and Poems of Sarah T. Bolton (Indianapolis, 1880), and Songs of a Life-Time (Indianapolis, 1892). Paddle Your Own Canoe, and Other Poems, published posthumously in 1897, is largely a reprint of Songs, with the addition of a few poems.

Bolton's poem, "Paddle Your Own Canoe," her most famous poem, was later set to music. "I Cannot Call Her Mother" and "A Reply to Katy Darling" are among her other musical compositions. As with her other writing, Bolton received little if any compensation for her songs, even after the sheet music was published and sold.

In addition to writing poetry and composing music, Bolton was active in efforts to secure property rights for women in Indiana. Although Robert Dale Owen is credited with securing passage of women's property rights, Bolton collaborated with him in efforts to lobby support from members of the Indiana General Assembly. She also lobbied delegates attending the state's constitutional convention in 1851 in Indianapolis. In an 1851 letter to Bolton, Owen congratulated her efforts to the cause, which included writing numerous articles and letters for Indiana newspapers in support of women's property rights.

While her husband served as U.S. consul to Geneva, Switzerland, in the mid-1850s she served as hostess for consul visitors and as a correspondent for the Cincinnati Commercial. After her return to Indiana, she continued to pursue her interests in social reform and a career as a poet.

== Later years ==
In 1871 Bolton purchased "Beech Bank," a 55-acre (22-hectare) farm about 5 miles (8.0 km) southeast of Indianapolis on the outskirts of present-day Beech Grove, Indiana. Bolton later returned to Indianapolis, where she continued to write poetry until her death in 1893.

== Death and legacy ==
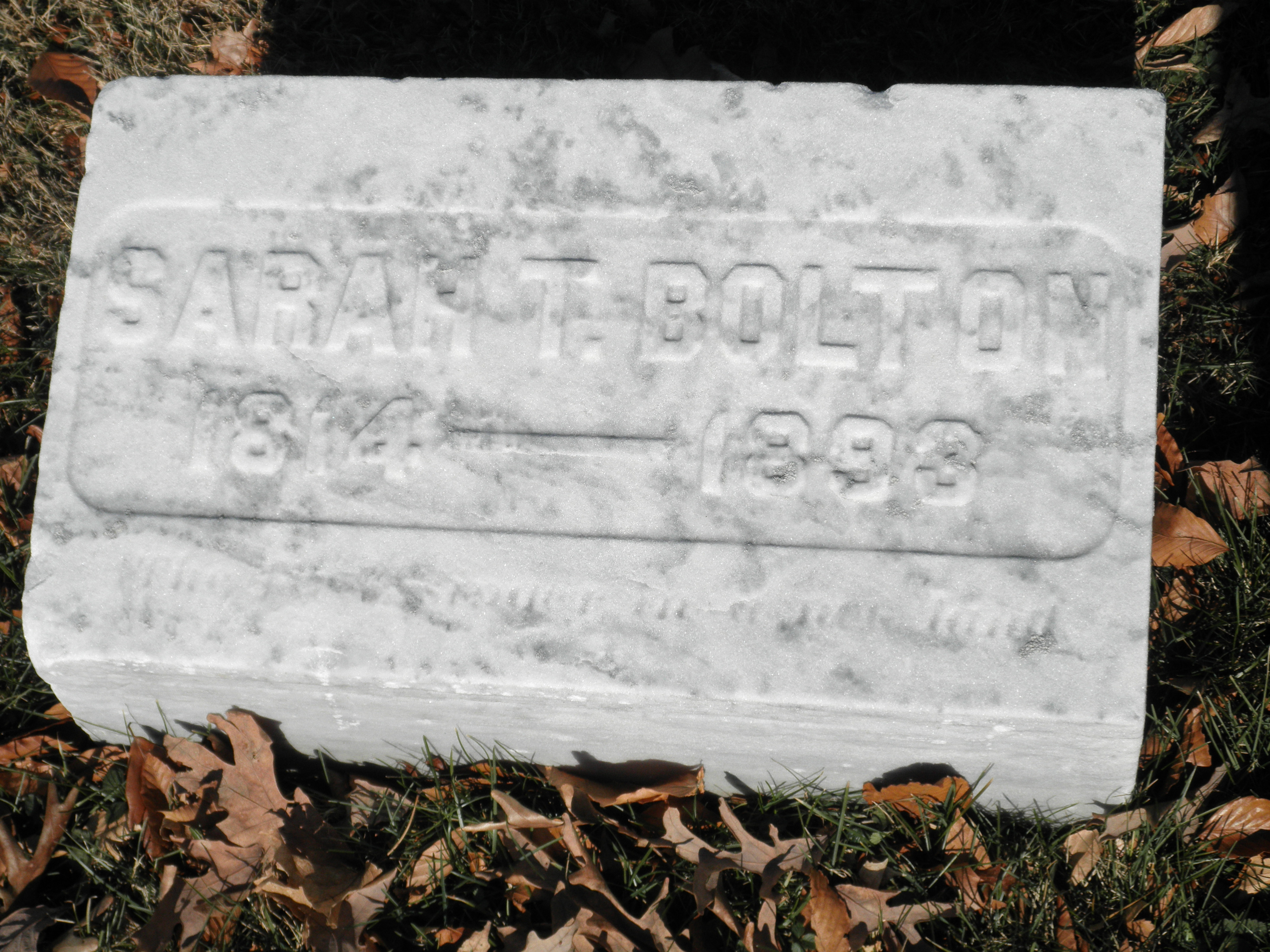
Bolton's gravestone at the Crown Hill Cemetery in Indianapolis.

Bolton died in Indianapolis, Indiana, on August 4, 1893. She is buried at Indianapolis's Crown Hill Cemetery beside the remains of her first husband, Nathaniel Bolton. A simple inscription and epitaph marks her grave: "Sarah T. Bolton, 1814–1893, The first singer in a new land."

Bolton was considered Indiana's foremost female poet for many years and its unofficial poet laureate. A complete collection of her poetry was published in Indianapolis in 1886. She was also called the "Pioneer Poet Laureate of Indiana". Most of Bolton's writings, including her narrative poetry, were idealistic and expressed her nostalgic views of early pioneer and farm life. Her poetry also had a "religious spirit," which present-day readers may consider overly "sentimental and trite." However, some of Bolton's poems show her concerns for social justice and sympathy for supporters of radical causes. For example, "Ne Dormiat Deus" expresses Bolton's concerns for women's inequality; "Evicted," "Two Scenes," and "Ye Sons of Toil" describe inequalities among social and economic classes; and "The Doomed Anarchist, " a poem inspired by Chicago's 1886 Haymarket affair, protests the death penalty.

The last stanza of "Paddle Your Own Canoe," sums up Bolton's philosophy of life:

Nothing great is lightly won, Nothing won is lost; Every good deed nobly done, Will repay the cost. Leave to heaven in humble trust, All you will to do; But if you succeed you must, Paddle your own canoe.

== Honors and tributes ==
- The town of Beech Grove, Indiana, purchased "Beech Bank," Bolton's former farm, in 1930; the site was renamed Sarah T. Bolton Park. The 32-acre park is the largest and most frequently used park in Beech Grove.
- A commemorative bronze relief by Emma Sangernebo in the Indiana Statehouse in Indianapolis was dedicated in 1941. It includes lines from Bolton's poem, "Indiana."

== Selected published works ==
- Poems (1865)
- The Life and Poems of Sarah T. Bolton (1880)
- Songs Of A Life-Time (1892): John Clark Ridpath, ed.
- Paddle Your Own Canoe, and Other Poems (1897)
