= Frances Elizabeth Willard (relief) =

- Artist: Lorado Taft
- Year: 1929
- Type: Bronze Relief
- Dimensions: 126.4 cm × 81 cm × 1.3 cm (49.75 in × 32 in × .5 in)
- Location: Indiana Statehouse, Indianapolis; 39°46′7″N 86°9′46″W
- Owner: Indiana Statehouse

Frances Elizabeth Willard is a public artwork designed by American artist Lorado Taft, located in the rotunda of the Indiana State House, in Indianapolis, Indiana, United States. It is a bronze plaque, given by the Women's Christian Temperance Union, commemorating the fiftieth anniversary of Frances Elizabeth Willard's election as President of the WCTU.

== Description ==
This bronze plaque measures 32 inches wide, 49 3/4 inches tall, and 1/2 inch deep. It has an inscription at the top and an inscription at the bottom. A right side profile relief of Frances Elizabeth Willard is between the two inscriptions. She is depicted wearing a dress with leg-o-mutton sleeves and a high lace neck. Her hair is pulled back into a bun.

The inscription on the top of the plaque reads:

In honor of one who made the world wider

for women and more homelike for humanity

Frances Elizabeth Willard

Intrepid Pathfinder and beloved leader

of the National and World's

Woman's Christian Temperance Union

The inscription on the bottom of the plaque reads:

Placed September 22-1929 by the

National W-C-T-U to commemorate the

Fiftieth Anniversary of Frances Willard's

Election as President in the city of

Indianapolis Indiana October 31-1879

The artist's signature is located on the front, proper left, bottom of the relief. It reads, "Lorado Taft Sc. 1929." The plaque is in excellent condition.

== Historical information ==
=== Location history ===
This plaque is located in the Indiana Statehouse Rotunda on the main floor.

In 1968, there were new rules proposed to Governor Roger D. Branigin by Hubert H. Hawkins, director of the Indiana Historical Bureau, Mrs. Floyd Hopper, head of the Indiana Division in the Indiana State Library, and Robert D. Starrett, curator of the Indiana State Museum regarding the display of paintings, busts, plaques and other memorials within the Indiana Statehouse. The guidelines were created to ensure a stable and continuous policy prevail when choosing the artwork to be displayed in the Statehouse.

If these guidelines were accepted, which they were not, the Frances Elizabeth Willard plaque would have been removed, along with the Sarah T. Bolton plaque.

Recommended guidelines included:

1. Those individuals or events being commemorated should have a significant relationship to Indiana and/or Indiana history.
2. Each display should have statewide importance.
3. Individuals should not be honored until 10 years after their death.
4. Statuary and plaques should be made of durable materials and busts should have identifying information attached to it.
5. All items should be artistically acceptable.
6. Those not meeting these requirements should be removed.

== See also ==
- Fountain of Time
- Black Hawk Statue
- Fountain of the Great Lakes
