= Jacob Piatt Dunn =

Ethnologist, historian, journalist, lawyer, and political reformer from Indianapolis

Jacob Piatt Dunn Jr.
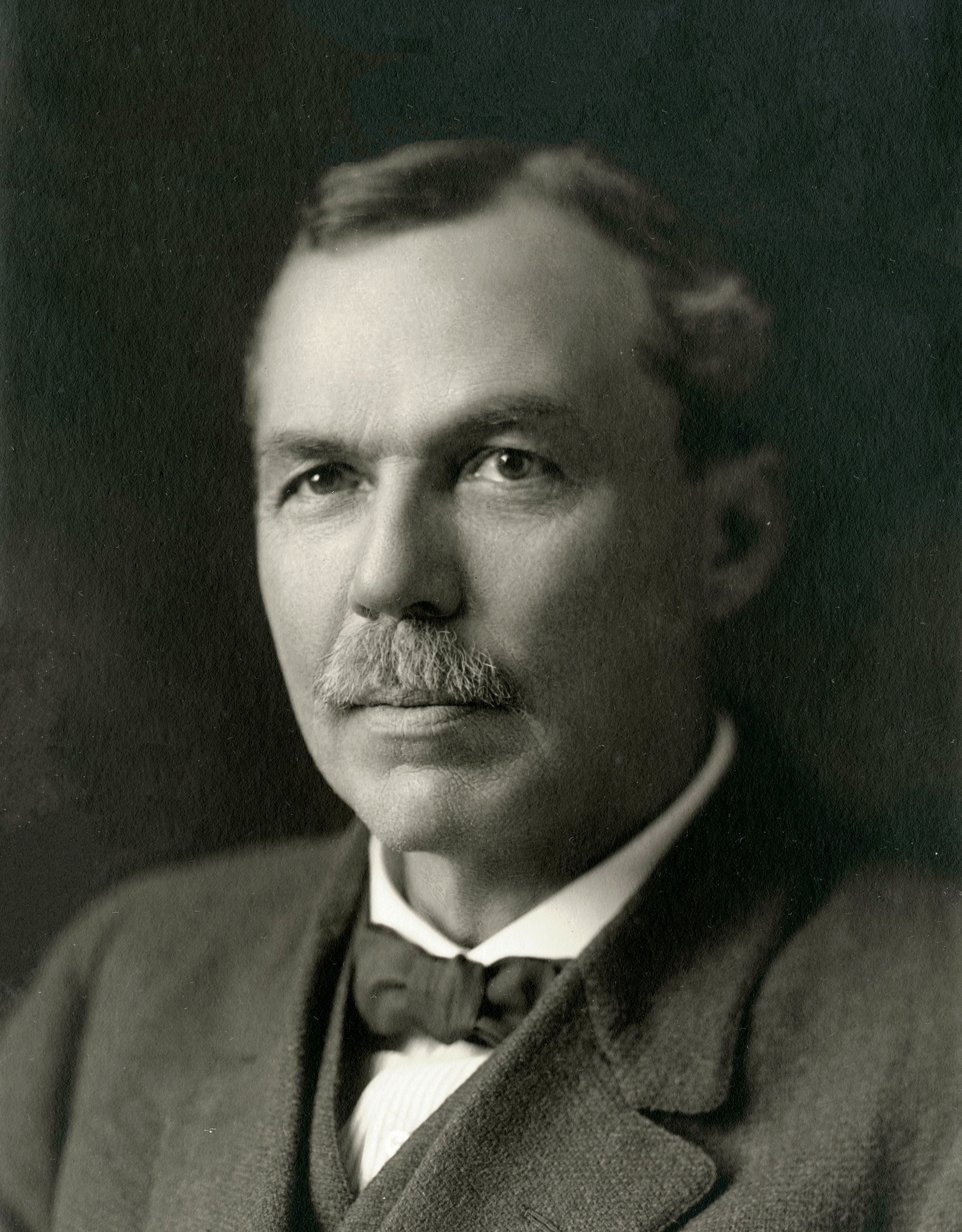
- Born: 12 April 1855; Lawrenceburg, Indiana, United States
- Died: 6 June 1924 (aged 69); Indianapolis, Indiana, United States
- Resting place: Crown Hill Cemetery and Arboretum, Section 13, Lot 9; 39.8188596°N 86.1753855°W
- Education: Earlham College; University of Michigan
- Occupations: Historian, journalist, and author
- Spouse: Carlotte Elliott (Jones) Dunn
- Children: two daughters, Caroline and Eleanor; one son
- Parent(s): Jacob and Harriet Louisa (Tate) Dunn

Jacob Piatt Dunn Jr. (April 12, 1855 – June 6, 1924) was an American historian, journalist, and author. A political writer and reformer, Dunn worked on ballot reform issues based on the Australian ballot system, authored a new Indianapolis city charter, and served as adviser to Indiana governor Thomas R. Marshall and U.S. Senator Samuel M. Ralston.

Born in Lawrenceburg, Indiana, Dunn grew up in Indianapolis, graduated from Earlham College in Richmond, Indiana, in 1874, and received a law degree (LL.B.) from the University of Michigan in 1876. Dunn briefly practiced law in Indianapolis, then moved to Colorado in 1879, where he and his brothers prospected and looked after their father's mining interests. It was in Colorado that Dunn discovered an interest in journalism and history.

In 1884, Dunn returned to Indianapolis and completed his first book, Massacres of the Mountains: A History of the Indian Wars of the Far West, 1815–1875, published in 1886. Dunn continued to research and write about state and local history, including Greater Indianapolis: The History, the Industries, the Institutions, and the People of a City of Homes (1910), his most important work. Other notable books include, Indiana: A Redemption from Slavery (1888) and Indiana and Indianans: A History of Aboriginal and Territorial Indiana and the Century of Statehood (1919). As an ethnologist, his main concern was that of the Miami tribe of Indiana and the preservation of its language. Dunn compiled a Miami–English dictionary that remains a valuable resource for researchers. Although Dunn was not trained as a historian, his writing on American history topics are still used and respected for studies of Indiana and Indianapolis history. Dunn's interest in history also led him to join other historians in revitalizing the Indiana Historical Society into an effective organization. Dunn served as its recording secretary from 1886 until his death. He also served two terms as the state librarian (1889 to 1893) and was appointed to the Indiana Public Library Commission, serving from 1899 to 1919 (and as its first president from 1899 to 1914).

Dunn's career as a newspaper journalist provided his primary source of income. He often wrote in support of Indiana's Democratic Party politics. His involvement in Indiana's political history is most notable for his crusade for election reform. Dunn supported the Australian ballot system, which helped to eliminate vote buying. In addition, Dunn and others drafted a new city charter for Indianapolis, which was approved after further amendments in 1891. Dunn was appointed for two terms as the Indianapolis city controller, from 1904 to 1906 and from 1914 to 1916, and served two years as chief deputy to the Marion County treasurer, from 1910 to 1912. Dunn ran for Indiana's Seventh Congressional District in 1902 as a Democrat, but lost to the Republican incumbent.

Dunn's service was not without controversy. As the Indianapolis city controller, he was criticized for using the interest earned on guaranty bonds for personal gain. Although there was no law prohibiting this practice, the mayor asked for Dunn's resignation, but he was never prosecuted. As a political advisor to Indiana governor Thomas R. Marshall, Dunn drafted a new Indiana Constitution, which expressed nativist views and racial bias. Dunn placed even more restrictions on voting than the version that already existed at that time. The proposal passed the Indiana General Assembly, but the Indiana Supreme Court deemed it unconstitutional and it failed in an appeal to the U.S. Supreme Court in 1913. Following a trip to Haiti and Santo Domingo in 1921, where Dunn hoped to identify profitable manganese mines, Samuel M. Ralston, newly elected to the U.S. Senate, chose Dunn as his secretary for his Washington, D.C. office. Dunn became ill while serving as Ralston's chief aide and died in 1924.

== Youth and education ==
Dunn was born in Lawrenceburg, Indiana, on April 12, 1855, the third of five children born to Jacob and Harriett Louisa (Tate) Dunn. Dunn's father, a cattle trader, went to the California goldfields in 1849, returned to Indiana in 1854, and moved the family to a farm on the Ohio River before finally settling in Indianapolis in 1861.

Dunn attended public schools in Indianapolis and graduated with a bachelor of science degree from Earlham College in Richmond, Indiana, in 1874. At Earlham, Dunn was a member of the Ionian Society, a literary group, and wrote for its monthly magazine, The Earlhamite. Dunn went on to obtain a law degree (LL.B.) from the University of Michigan two years later. After graduation, Dunn returned to Indianapolis and briefly practiced law, working for the firm of McDonald and Butler, before moving with his brothers to Colorado in 1879 to prospect and look after their father's silver mine interests. It was in Colorado that Dunn discovered an interest in journalism and history that continued throughout the remainder of his life. While in Colorado, Dunn researched the history of Native Americans in the Far West and served as a reporter for newspapers in Denver and Leadville, Colorado. Dunn contributed articles to the Denver Tribune-Republican, the Leadville Chronicle, the Maysville Democrat, and the Rocky Mountain News, before returning to Indianapolis in 1884.

== Early career ==
After Dunn returned permanently to Indianapolis in 1884, he resumed his law practice and completed Massacres of the Mountains: A History of the Indian Wars of the Far West, 1815–1875 using research he had begun in Colorado. Harper and Row published the book in 1886. Dunn's work helped him earn a master's degree from Earlham College. Relying heavily on government documents, Dunn analyzed the subject in detail, creating the first scholarly look at the subject and a "minor classic" that is "still used and respected" by scholars of American history. At the same time, Houghton, Mifflin, and Company was working on its American Commonwealths series and invited Dunn to write the Indiana volume, Indiana: A Redemption from Slavery, published in 1888. Using resources from the Library of Congress, the Bureau of American Ethnology, the Canadian archives, Indiana State Library, and the Indianapolis Public Library, Dunn considered the question of slavery in the Indiana Territory. Dunn further supported himself by writing political editorials for local newspapers, including work for the Indianapolis Sentinel, which he also edited for a time.

In 1886 Dunn joined fellow Hoosiers, including William H. English, Daniel Wait Howe, Major Jonathan W. Gordon, and other Indianapolis historians to "revitalize" the languishing Indiana Historical Society. Dunn was selected as its recording secretary in 1886 and held the post until his death. Dunn was instrumental in forming the IHS into an active organization. In addition, Dunn secured funds from the Indiana legislature to improve the Indiana State Library's resources and served two terms as the Indiana state librarian, from 1889 to 1893. A strong supporter of free public libraries, Dunn was also one of three people appointed to the newly created Indiana Public Library Commission, where he served from 1899 to 1919 (from 1899 to 1914 as its first president). In addition to his position as state librarian, Dunn's other jobs included two terms as the Indianapolis city controller, from 1904 to 1906 and from 1914 to 1916, and two years as chief deputy to the Marion County treasurer, Frank P. Fishback, from 1910 to 1912. Dunn ran for Indiana's Seventh Congressional District in 1902 as a Democrat, but lost to the Republican incumbent, Jesse Overstreet.

== Marriage and family ==
On November 23, 1892, Dunn married Charlotte Elliott Jones. The couple met when they had acting parts in an amateur theatrical at the Indianapolis Propylaeum Club. The Dunns had two daughters; their only son drowned in 1904, while the family was on vacation in Nantucket, Massachusetts.

== Political reformer ==
Dunn's involvement in Indiana's political history is notable, especially his crusade for ballot reform. As a political reformer, Dunn worked within the state's Democratic Party on election issues. Dunn supported the Australian ballot system, where the government, rather than the political parties, printed and distributed the official ballot, and voters marked their ballots at polling places in secret, helping to eliminate vote buying. Indiana's secret ballot law served as a model for other states to follow. Although it was a move forward, Dunn felt it fell short of eliminating vote buying entirely and continued his efforts for additional election reforms in the state.

In 1890 the Commercial Club appointed a nonpartisan committee, which included Dunn and other Indianapolis citizens, to draft a new charter for the city using Philadelphia's Bullitt Law and Brooklyn's city charter as models. Among the proposed changes, the new Indianapolis city charter increased the mayor's power, allowing appointments to the Board of Public Works, the Board of Public Safety, the Board of Health, and the city engineer without additional approval from the city council or board of aldermen. Following further amendments, the new charter was approved by the Indiana General Assembly in 1891.

In 1914, as the city controller appointed by the Democratic mayor Joseph E. Bell, Dunn was criticized in the Indianapolis News for using interest earned on contractors' guaranty bonds for personal gain. Although there was no law prohibiting this, and previous occupants of the office had also followed this custom, Bell ordered Dunn to stop the practice in December 1915. Six months later Bell asked for Dunn's resignation along with two others, John Reddington, the deputy city controller, and John Pugh, the deputy auditor of the Board of School Commissioners. The Indianapolis News reported that Dunn was being made the scapegoat for irregularities made by political appointees. Dunn was not prosecuted; however, "Reddington, Pugh, and John Shaughnessy, a former bookkeeper in the controller's office, were indicted by a Marion County grand jury."

Dunn also worked at the state level as adviser to Indiana governor Thomas R. Marshall and drafted a new state constitution. The much-debated proposal for the new state constitution passed the Indiana Senate on February 27, 1911, and the Indiana House of Representatives on March 2, 1911, but it was ruled as unconstitutional by the Indiana Supreme Court, which had a Republican majority. The U.S. Supreme Court denied an appeal on December 1, 1913, defeating the effort.

== Author and ethnographer ==
Following the publications of Massacres of the Mountains and Indiana: A Redemption from Slavery, Dunn continued to research and write about other state and local history topics. While he remained a part-time historian, Dunn wrote for and edited several Indiana Historical Society publications and contributed articles to other scholarly journals. In The Word Hoosier, published in 1907, Dunn detailed his extensive research into the origin of the word as a term for citizens of Indiana. He also wrote biographical material for publications such as Men of Progress: Indiana, published in 1899, and Memorial and Genealogical Record of Representative Citizens of Indiana, published in 1912.

Dunn's career as a newspaper journalist, his primary source of income, gave him the opportunity to write about state and local politics. As a political writer for the Democratic State Central Committee, Dunn wrote Seven Percent Off: What the Democratic Party Demands from the Protection Monopolists in 1888. Dunn also contributed articles to the Indianapolis Sentinel, Indianapolis News, Indianapolis Star, and the Indianapolis Times. Dunn used his "considerable writing skills" to support Indiana's Democratic party politics.

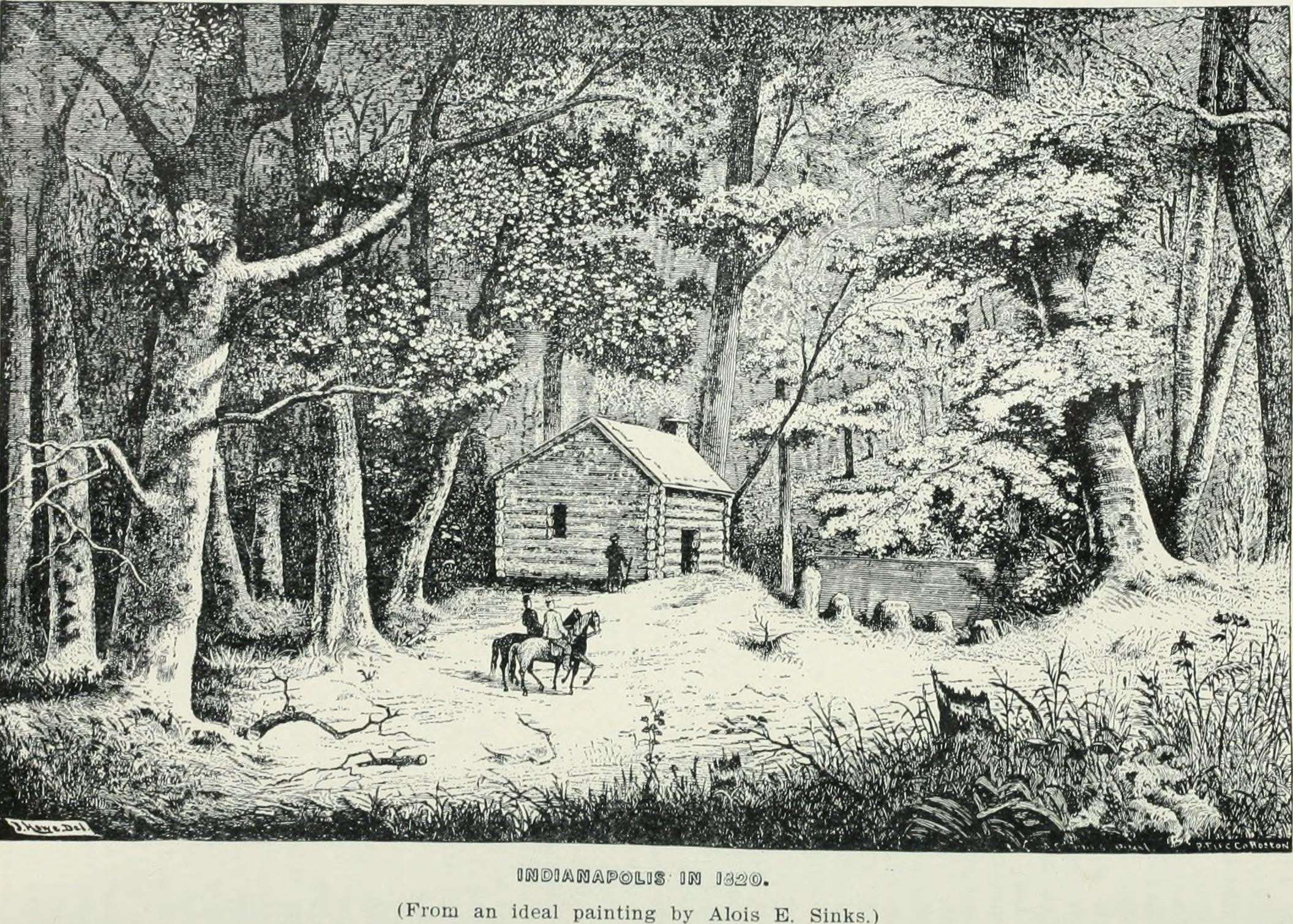
A drawing of Indianapolis in 1820 from Dunn's 1910 history of the city

Dunn's two-volume book, Greater Indianapolis: The History, the Industries, the Institutions, and the People of a City of Homes, published In 1910, is considered to be his greatest work. It remains a valuable resource for those interested in the city's development. While the first volume is an "intelligently written, well-researched" local history, the second volume consists of "standard biographies of notable Indianapolis residents. Greater Indianapolis, along with his five-volume Indiana and Indianans: A History of Aboriginal and Territorial Indiana and the Century of Statehood, published in 1919, are still considered "indispensable sources" for studying Indiana history.

In addition to the history of Indiana, Dunn remained interested in Native American history. From his time in Colorado, Dunn continued to collect information on American Indians. His research on tribes in Indiana first appeared in articles for the Indianapolis News and was later published in a book, True Indiana Stories, in 1908. In addition, Dunn was passionate about preservation of Native American languages, especially Potawatomi, Shawnee, and Miami. In his other notable twentieth-century work, the compilation of a Miami–English filecard dictionary of the Miami-Illinois language, commissioned by the Bureau of American Ethnology, Dunn worked with several different speakers of the language in Indiana and Oklahoma. Three sections of the dictionary were completed before the bureau ended its support of the project, but Dunn continued work on the manuscript of the Miami dictionary, which is part of the Indiana State Library's collections and remains a "valuable resource" for researchers.

In 1916 Dunn tried to establish a national Society for the Preservation of Indian Languages, but his efforts were unsuccessful. Even though this effort failed, he continued to write about Indiana's Native American heritage. After the National Research Council, Division of Anthropology and Psychology, encouraged efforts to conduct archaeological surveys in Indiana, Illinois, Iowa, and Missouri, Dunn served on an Indiana committee that urged the Indiana General Assembly to establish a research project under the direction of the Indiana Conservation Commission (known today as the Indiana Department of Natural Resources).

== Later years ==
While in his sixties, Dunn traveled to Hispaniola for two months in 1921, visiting Haiti and Santo Domingo to evaluate the area's mineral resources and hoping to identify profitable manganese mines for a group of American investors. He was not successful in finding sufficient deposits of manganese or gold. Returning to the United States in early 1922, Dunn wrote about his Haitian adventures as well as his studies of the island's dialects and voodoo cult.

In 1922 Samuel M. Ralston, the newly elected U.S. Senator from Indiana, chose Dunn as his private secretary for his office in Washington, D.C. While serving as Ralston's chief aide, Dunn became ill from a tropical disease he had contracted on his trip to Haiti that made him prone to jaundice. Dunn had to return home to Indianapolis. He died on June 6, 1924. Dunn is buried in Crown Hill Cemetery in Indianapolis.

== Legacy ==
As a political reformer, some claim Dunn was an example of a blend between a secular evangelist and progressive, while others believe he was more of a "'hide-bound' partisan". Working behind the scenes in Indiana politics, Dunn worked to secure honest elections in the state through adoption of new ballot laws and a proposal for a new state constitution. In addition, he was an advisor to Hoosier Democrats such as Indiana's governor Thomas R. Marshall and U.S. Senator Samuel M. Ralston. At the same time, he combined lifelong interests in politics and history by writing several memorable books on Indiana history. A collection of his works and papers are held at the Indiana Historical Society.

Dunn is best remembered as the author of several important works on Indiana history, most notably Greater Indianapolis. Although he was not an academically trained historian, Dunn did "yeoman work" in documentary research on Native Americans in the western United States, supported research and preservation of the Miami language, and wrote extensively on the history of Indiana and its residents. He was also an active journalist and political writer, "notable for his ability to understand and sympathize with the motivations of both sides of most disputes." Two of Dunn's efforts ended unsuccessfully: the first, obtaining precious metals in the American West and Hispaniola; the second, and far more controversial, a desire to write a new Indiana state constitution, which included language that would have removed voting privileges for many immigrants and blacks. Dunn's draft of a new Indiana constitution placed even more restrictions on voting than the existing version. Although the effort failed, Dunn still played a pivotal role in the state's efforts in election reform with the adoption of the Australian ballot system.

Dunn's descriptions of Haiti's cannibalistic aboriginals and voodoo and his use of racist terms such as nigger and chink have caused some historians to question Dunn's sincerity on wanting to preserve the language of the Miamis. Others acknowledge his actions may have "personified the vanities and limitations of his time, place, and social class."

== Selected works ==
- Dunn Jr., Jacob Piatt (1894). "Documents Relating to the French Settlements on the Wabash". Indiana Historical Society Publications. 2 (11). Indianapolis: Indiana Historical Society: 403–42.
- — (December 1910). "Duty of the State to Its History". Indiana Magazine of History. 6 (4). Bloomington: Indiana University: 137–143.
- — (1910). Greater Indianapolis: The History, the Industries, the Institutions, and the People of a City of Homes. Chicago: The Lewis Publishing Co.
- — (1888). Indiana: A Redemption from Slavery. Boston: Houghton, Mifflin and Company.
- — (1919). Indiana and Indianans: A History of Aboriginal and Territorial Indiana and the Century of Statehood. Chicago: The American Historical Society.
- — (September 1912). "Indiana Geographical Nomenclature". Indiana Magazine of History. 8 (3). Bloomington: Indiana University: 109–14.
- — (1889). A Manual of the Election Law of Indiana. Indianapolis: William B. Burford.
- — (1886). Massacres of the Mountains: A History of the Indian Wars of the Far West. New York: Harper and Brothers.
- — (1912). Memorial and Genealogical Record of Representative Citizens of Indiana. Indianapolis: B. F. Bower and Company.
- — (1892). The New Tax Law of Indiana and the Science of Taxation. Indianapolis: Indianapolis Printing Company.
- — (1911). The Proposed Constitution of Indiana. Indianapolis: Sentinel Printing Company.
- — (1909). True Indian Stories: With Glossary of Indiana Indian Names. Indianapolis: Sentinel Printing Company.
- — (1907). "The Word "Hoosier"". Indiana Historical Society Publications. 4 (2). Indianapolis: Indiana Historical Society: 3–29.

== Bibliography ==
- Bodenhamer, David; Barrows, Robert G., eds. (1994). The Encyclopedia of Indianapolis. Bloomington and Indianapolis: Indiana University Press. ISBN 0253112494.
- Boomhower, Ray (December 1994). "'To Secure Honest Elections': Jacob Piatt Dunn Jr., and the Reform of Indiana's Ballot". Indiana Magazine of History. 90 (4). Bloomington: Indiana University: 311–345.
- Boomhower, Ray E. (1997). Jacob Piatt Dunn Jr.: A Life in History and Politics, 1855–1924. Indianapolis: Indiana Historical Society. ISBN 0-87195-119-3.
- Ruegamer, Lana (September 1985). "History, Politics, and the Active Life: Jacob Piatt Dunn, Progressive Historian". Indiana Magazine of History. 81 (3). Bloomington: Indiana University: 265–283.
