= 1916 United States presidential election in Iowa =

- November 7, 1916
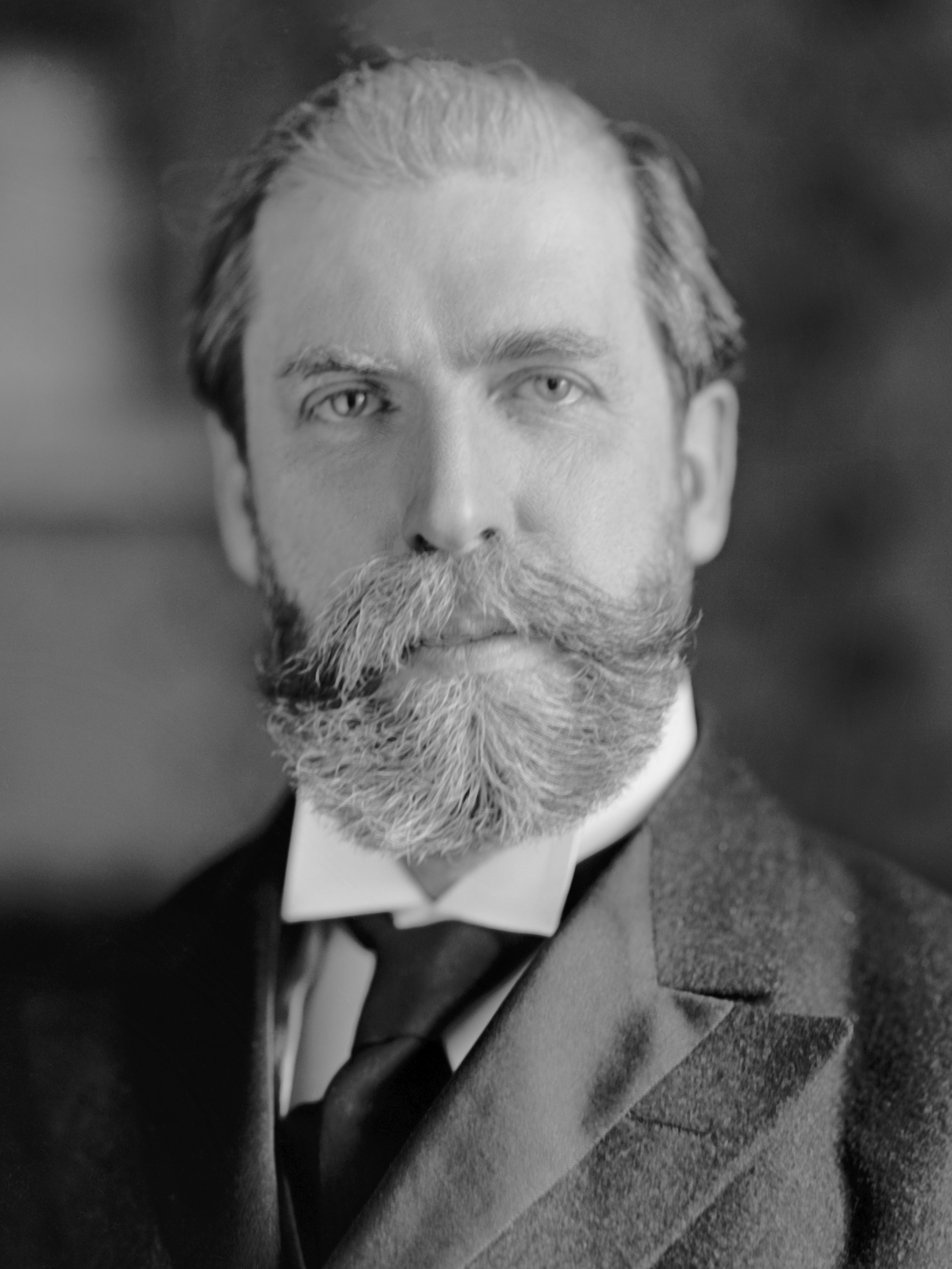

Nominee	Charles Evans Hughes	Woodrow Wilson
Party	Republican	Democratic
Home state	New York	New Jersey
Running mate	Charles W. Fairbanks	Thomas R. Marshall
Electoral vote	13	0
Popular vote	280,439	221,699
Percentage	54.25%	42.89%
County results
Hughes
40–50%
50–60%
60–70%
70–80%
Wilson
40–50%
50–60%
President before election
Woodrow Wilson
Democratic
Elected President
Woodrow Wilson
Democratic

The 1916 United States presidential election in Iowa took place on November 7, 1916, as part of the 1916 United States presidential election which was held throughout all contemporary 48 states. Voters chose 13 representatives, or electors to the Electoral College, who voted for president and vice president.

Iowa was won by Republican nominee, U.S. Supreme Court Justice Charles Evans Hughes of New York, and his running mate Senator Charles W. Fairbanks of Indiana. They defeated Democratic nominees, incumbent Democratic President Woodrow Wilson and Vice President Thomas R. Marshall.

Hughes won the state by a margin of 11.36%.

With 54.25% of the vote, Iowa would prove to be Hughes' fourth strongest state in terms of popular votes percentage after Vermont, New Jersey and Pennsylvania.

This election was one of only three elections in the state's history that it voted against the winning incumbent as Woodrow Wilson was the first presidential incumbent to secure a second consecutive term in office without carrying the state until FDR in 1940 who lost it in his third and then fourth presidential victory in 1944. They are currently the only Presidents in history to have carried the state upon winning the White House and lost it upon winning re-election.

Wilson was the first president to win without Keokuk county since James Buchanan in 1856.

== Results ==
1916 United States presidential election in Iowa
Party	Candidate	Running mate	Popular vote		Electoral vote	
Party	Candidate	Running mate	Count	%	Count	%
Republican	Charles Evans Hughes of New York	Charles Warren Fairbanks of Indiana	280,439	54.25%	13	100.00%
Democratic	Woodrow Wilson of New Jersey	Thomas Riley Marshall of Indiana	221,699	42.89%	0	0.00%
Socialist	Allan Louis Benson of New York	George Ross Kirkpatrick of New Jersey	10,976	2.12%	0	0.00%
Prohibition	James Franklin Hanly of Indiana	Ira Landrith of Tennessee	3,371	0.65%	0	0.00%
Socialist Labor	Arthur E. Reimer of Massachusetts	Caleb Harrison of Illinois	459	0.09%	0	0.00%
Total			516,944	100.00%	13	100.00%

=== Results by county ===
County	Charles Evans Hughes Republican		Thomas Woodrow Wilson Democratic		Allan Louis Benson Socialist		James Franklin Hanly Prohibition		Arthur Elmer Reimer Socialist Labor		Margin		Total votes cast
County	#	%	#	%	#	%	#	%	#	%	#	%	Total votes cast
Adair	1,922	53.87%	1,619	45.38%	17	0.48%	10	0.28%	0	0.00%	303	8.49%	3,568
Adams	1,401	50.20%	1,365	48.91%	16	0.57%	9	0.32%	0	0.00%	36	1.29%	2,791
Allamakee	2,411	57.97%	1,714	41.21%	24	0.58%	8	0.19%	2	0.05%	697	16.76%	4,159
Appanoose	3,327	52.43%	2,510	39.55%	461	7.26%	32	0.50%	16	0.25%	817	12.87%	6,346
Audubon	1,581	55.61%	1,247	43.86%	7	0.25%	6	0.21%	2	0.07%	334	11.75%	2,843
Benton	3,189	54.16%	2,556	43.41%	106	1.80%	29	0.49%	8	0.14%	633	10.75%	5,888
Black Hawk	6,742	59.34%	4,270	37.58%	247	2.17%	79	0.70%	23	0.20%	2,472	21.76%	11,361
Boone	2,955	52.41%	2,338	41.47%	256	4.54%	70	1.24%	19	0.34%	617	10.94%	5,638
Bremer	2,684	69.77%	1,132	29.43%	19	0.49%	11	0.29%	1	0.03%	1,552	40.34%	3,847
Buchanan	3,000	61.79%	1,808	37.24%	23	0.47%	24	0.49%	0	0.00%	1,192	24.55%	4,855
Buena Vista	2,045	57.38%	1,454	40.80%	48	1.35%	17	0.48%	0	0.00%	591	16.58%	3,564
Butler	2,722	72.45%	977	26.00%	40	1.06%	18	0.48%	0	0.00%	1,745	46.45%	3,757
Calhoun	2,276	58.34%	1,515	38.84%	66	1.69%	42	1.08%	2	0.05%	761	19.51%	3,901
Carroll	2,408	53.10%	2,085	45.98%	18	0.40%	22	0.49%	2	0.04%	323	7.12%	4,535
Cass	2,763	59.75%	1,801	38.95%	51	1.10%	8	0.17%	1	0.02%	962	20.80%	4,624
Cedar	2,862	63.56%	1,595	35.42%	30	0.67%	14	0.31%	2	0.04%	1,267	28.14%	4,503
Cerro Gordo	3,556	59.28%	2,289	38.16%	105	1.75%	49	0.82%	0	0.00%	1,267	21.12%	5,999
Cherokee	1,578	48.26%	1,646	50.34%	22	0.67%	24	0.73%	0	0.00%	-68	-2.08%	3,270
Chickasaw	1,999	53.61%	1,697	45.51%	20	0.54%	13	0.35%	0	0.00%	302	8.10%	3,729
Clarke	1,507	55.10%	1,175	42.96%	19	0.69%	33	1.21%	1	0.04%	332	12.14%	2,735
Clay	1,649	55.41%	1,234	41.47%	75	2.52%	17	0.57%	1	0.03%	415	13.94%	2,976
Clayton	3,347	57.54%	2,379	40.90%	72	1.24%	17	0.29%	2	0.03%	968	16.64%	5,817
Clinton	5,576	56.61%	3,903	39.62%	291	2.95%	69	0.70%	11	0.11%	1,673	16.98%	9,850
Crawford	2,756	58.27%	1,919	40.57%	44	0.93%	11	0.23%	0	0.00%	837	17.70%	4,730
Dallas	2,900	52.37%	2,495	45.05%	95	1.72%	40	0.72%	8	0.14%	405	7.31%	5,538
Davis	1,476	44.14%	1,811	54.16%	39	1.17%	18	0.54%	0	0.00%	-335	-10.02%	3,344
Decatur	1,962	47.45%	2,111	51.05%	36	0.87%	24	0.58%	2	0.05%	-149	-3.60%	4,135
Delaware	2,827	66.78%	1,332	31.47%	49	1.16%	22	0.52%	3	0.07%	1,495	35.32%	4,233
Des Moines	4,132	49.51%	3,827	45.86%	292	3.50%	73	0.87%	21	0.25%	305	3.65%	8,345
Dickinson	1,249	57.24%	893	40.93%	35	1.60%	5	0.23%	0	0.00%	356	16.32%	2,182
Dubuque	5,772	47.22%	6,063	49.60%	372	3.04%	11	0.09%	5	0.04%	-291	-2.38%	12,223
Emmet	1,409	62.37%	809	35.81%	34	1.51%	7	0.31%	0	0.00%	600	26.56%	2,259
Fayette	3,872	60.81%	2,311	36.30%	140	2.20%	39	0.61%	5	0.08%	1,561	24.52%	6,367
Floyd	2,691	66.10%	1,250	30.70%	99	2.43%	25	0.61%	6	0.15%	1,441	35.40%	4,071
Franklin	2,464	77.24%	691	21.66%	22	0.69%	11	0.34%	2	0.06%	1,773	55.58%	3,190
Fremont	1,732	44.38%	2,085	53.42%	45	1.15%	35	0.90%	6	0.15%	-353	-9.04%	3,903
Greene	2,345	60.85%	1,455	37.75%	8	0.21%	41	1.06%	5	0.13%	890	23.09%	3,854
Grundy	2,127	67.23%	1,015	32.08%	14	0.44%	6	0.19%	2	0.06%	1,112	35.15%	3,164
Guthrie	2,316	55.30%	1,805	43.10%	37	0.88%	28	0.67%	2	0.05%	511	12.20%	4,188
Hamilton	3,037	70.94%	1,125	26.28%	78	1.82%	39	0.91%	2	0.05%	1,912	44.66%	4,281
Hancock	1,726	64.43%	913	34.08%	24	0.90%	15	0.56%	1	0.04%	813	30.35%	2,679
Hardin	3,335	67.72%	1,481	30.07%	46	0.93%	56	1.14%	7	0.14%	1,854	37.64%	4,925
Harrison	2,610	45.88%	2,932	51.54%	96	1.69%	49	0.86%	2	0.04%	-322	-5.66%	5,689
Henry	2,470	57.99%	1,728	40.57%	24	0.56%	31	0.73%	6	0.14%	742	17.42%	4,259
Howard	1,562	48.86%	1,560	48.80%	34	1.06%	38	1.19%	3	0.09%	2	0.06%	3,197
Humboldt	1,676	66.69%	809	32.19%	20	0.80%	8	0.32%	0	0.00%	867	34.50%	2,513
Ida	1,412	51.12%	1,244	45.04%	92	3.33%	14	0.51%	0	0.00%	168	6.08%	2,762
Iowa	2,484	57.90%	1,763	41.10%	18	0.42%	23	0.54%	2	0.05%	721	16.81%	4,290
Jackson	2,533	52.63%	2,186	45.42%	66	1.37%	22	0.46%	6	0.12%	347	7.21%	4,813
Jasper	3,092	47.08%	3,282	49.97%	141	2.15%	48	0.73%	5	0.08%	-190	-2.89%	6,568
Jefferson	2,167	54.61%	1,734	43.70%	29	0.73%	37	0.93%	1	0.03%	433	10.91%	3,968
Johnson	2,704	42.23%	3,650	57.00%	32	0.50%	15	0.23%	2	0.03%	-946	-14.77%	6,403
Jones	2,848	58.62%	1,966	40.47%	26	0.54%	18	0.37%	0	0.00%	882	18.16%	4,858
Keokuk	2,822	52.18%	2,486	45.97%	51	0.94%	48	0.89%	1	0.02%	336	6.21%	5,408
Kossuth	2,647	59.63%	1,748	39.38%	26	0.59%	16	0.36%	2	0.05%	899	20.25%	4,439
Lee	4,395	51.18%	3,993	46.50%	139	1.62%	49	0.57%	11	0.13%	402	4.68%	8,587
Linn	8,212	55.67%	6,131	41.56%	278	1.88%	119	0.81%	11	0.07%	2,081	14.11%	14,751
Louisa	1,876	62.26%	1,081	35.88%	37	1.23%	16	0.53%	3	0.10%	795	26.39%	3,013
Lucas	1,672	47.91%	1,536	44.01%	234	6.70%	40	1.15%	8	0.23%	136	3.90%	3,490
Lyon	1,760	59.78%	1,137	38.62%	46	1.56%	1	0.03%	0	0.00%	623	21.16%	2,944
Madison	1,871	51.26%	1,711	46.88%	25	0.68%	39	1.07%	4	0.11%	160	4.38%	3,650
Mahaska	3,143	48.14%	3,151	48.26%	98	1.50%	133	2.04%	4	0.06%	-8	-0.12%	6,529
Marion	2,459	42.90%	3,094	53.98%	145	2.53%	31	0.54%	3	0.05%	-635	-11.08%	5,732
Marshall	4,172	60.32%	2,414	34.90%	224	3.24%	101	1.46%	5	0.07%	1,758	25.42%	6,916
Mills	1,707	50.58%	1,600	47.41%	38	1.13%	27	0.80%	3	0.09%	107	3.17%	3,375
Mitchell	1,963	64.38%	1,033	33.88%	37	1.21%	16	0.52%	0	0.00%	930	30.50%	3,049
Monona	1,777	47.87%	1,910	51.45%	25	0.67%	0	0.00%	0	0.00%	-133	-3.58%	3,712
Monroe	2,144	45.15%	2,095	44.11%	451	9.50%	47	0.99%	12	0.25%	49	1.03%	4,749
Montgomery	2,333	60.33%	1,431	37.01%	82	2.12%	18	0.47%	3	0.08%	902	23.33%	3,867
Muscatine	3,929	54.25%	2,694	37.20%	573	7.91%	34	0.47%	12	0.17%	1,235	17.05%	7,242
O'Brien	2,021	52.53%	1,787	46.45%	29	0.75%	10	0.26%	0	0.00%	234	6.08%	3,847
Osceola	1,258	58.05%	874	40.33%	28	1.29%	7	0.32%	0	0.00%	384	17.72%	2,167
Page	2,993	60.87%	1,747	35.53%	106	2.16%	68	1.38%	3	0.06%	1,246	25.34%	4,917
Palo Alto	1,594	48.49%	1,630	49.59%	40	1.22%	22	0.67%	1	0.03%	-36	-1.10%	3,287
Plymouth	2,666	53.14%	2,258	45.01%	30	0.60%	62	1.24%	1	0.02%	408	8.13%	5,017
Pocahontas	1,808	51.29%	1,658	47.04%	37	1.05%	18	0.51%	4	0.11%	150	4.26%	3,525
Polk	11,295	45.81%	12,327	50.00%	764	3.10%	211	0.86%	59	0.24%	-1,032	-4.19%	24,656
Pottawattamie	5,992	47.83%	6,263	49.99%	187	1.49%	78	0.62%	9	0.07%	-271	-2.16%	12,529
Poweshiek	2,748	57.39%	1,880	39.26%	99	2.07%	61	1.27%	0	0.00%	868	18.13%	4,788
Ringgold	1,733	55.46%	1,351	43.23%	25	0.80%	15	0.48%	1	0.03%	382	12.22%	3,125
Sac	2,057	55.03%	1,629	43.58%	35	0.94%	16	0.43%	1	0.03%	428	11.45%	3,738
Scott	8,329	56.39%	5,212	35.29%	1,143	7.74%	40	0.27%	46	0.31%	3,117	21.10%	14,770
Shelby	1,898	47.50%	2,060	51.55%	25	0.63%	12	0.30%	1	0.03%	-162	-4.05%	3,996
Sioux	2,261	51.89%	2,049	47.03%	37	0.85%	7	0.16%	3	0.07%	212	4.87%	4,357
Story	3,722	66.18%	1,772	31.51%	49	0.87%	76	1.35%	5	0.09%	1,950	34.67%	5,624
Tama	3,061	53.37%	2,572	44.85%	57	0.99%	40	0.70%	5	0.09%	489	8.53%	5,735
Taylor	2,219	54.70%	1,775	43.75%	44	1.08%	18	0.44%	1	0.02%	444	10.94%	4,057
Union	2,050	49.95%	1,985	48.37%	30	0.73%	37	0.90%	2	0.05%	65	1.58%	4,104
Van Buren	1,994	52.52%	1,735	45.69%	32	0.84%	32	0.84%	4	0.11%	259	6.82%	3,797
Wapello	4,398	47.65%	3,994	43.28%	786	8.52%	41	0.44%	10	0.11%	404	4.38%	9,229
Warren	2,182	52.21%	1,910	45.70%	30	0.72%	55	1.32%	2	0.05%	272	6.51%	4,179
Washington	2,745	55.31%	2,139	43.10%	34	0.69%	44	0.89%	1	0.02%	606	12.21%	4,963
Wayne	1,936	48.68%	1,935	48.65%	71	1.79%	32	0.80%	3	0.08%	1	0.03%	3,977
Webster	3,917	53.50%	3,196	43.66%	151	2.06%	52	0.71%	5	0.07%	721	9.85%	7,321
Winnebago	1,713	72.92%	584	24.86%	23	0.98%	29	1.23%	0	0.00%	1,129	48.06%	2,349
Winneshiek	2,876	57.87%	1,956	39.36%	121	2.43%	15	0.30%	2	0.04%	920	18.51%	4,970
Woodbury	5,735	38.61%	8,819	59.38%	212	1.43%	79	0.53%	8	0.05%	-3,084	-20.76%	14,853
Worth	1,463	70.44%	566	27.25%	34	1.64%	12	0.58%	2	0.10%	897	43.19%	2,077
Wright	2,599	68.22%	1,135	29.79%	65	1.71%	11	0.29%	0	0.00%	1,464	38.43%	3,810
Soldier's Vote	1,108	49.44%	1,102	49.17%	23	1.03%	6	0.27%	2	0.09%	6	0.27%	2,241
Totals	280,439	54.25%	221,699	42.89%	10,976	2.12%	3,371	0.65%	459	0.09%	58,740	11.36%	516,944

== See also ==
- United States presidential elections in Iowa
