= 1916 United States presidential election in North Carolina =

- November 7, 1916

All 12 North Carolina votes to the Electoral College

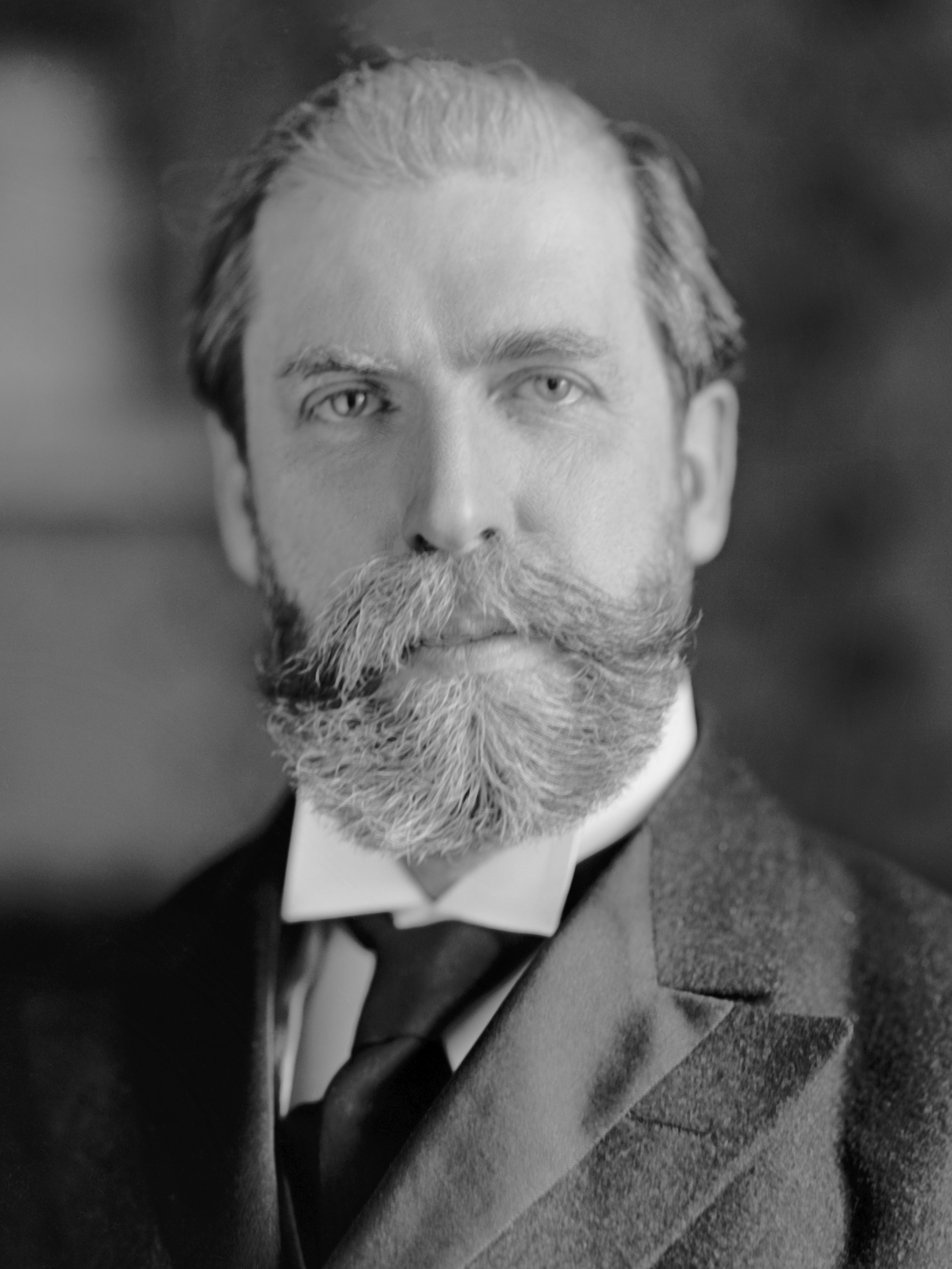
Nominee	Woodrow Wilson	Charles Evans Hughes
Party	Democratic	Republican
Home state	New Jersey	New York
Running mate	Thomas R. Marshall	Charles W. Fairbanks
Electoral vote	12	0
Popular vote	168,383	120,890
Percentage	58.10%	41.71%
County results
Wilson
50–60%
60–70%
70–80%
80–90%
90–100%
Hughes
50–60%
60–70%
70–80%
Tie
<50%
President before election
Woodrow Wilson
Democratic
Elected President
Woodrow Wilson
Democratic

The 1916 United States presidential election in North Carolina took place on November 7, 1916, as part of the 1916 United States presidential election, which was held throughout all contemporary forty-eight states. Voters chose twelve representatives, or electors to the Electoral College, who voted for president and vice president.

Like all former Confederate states, North Carolina would during its "Redemption" develop a politics based upon Jim Crow laws, disfranchisement of its African-American population and dominance of the Democratic Party. Unlike the Deep South, the Republican Party possessed sufficient historic Unionist white support from the mountains and northwestern Piedmont to gain a stable one-third of the statewide vote total in general elections even after blacks lost the right to vote. A rapid move following disenfranchisement to a completely "lily-white" state GOP also helped maintain Republican support amongst the state's voters. Like Tennessee and Oklahoma, the relative strength of Republican opposition meant that North Carolina did not have statewide White primaries, although certain counties did use the White primary. Although with disfranchisement of blacks the state introduced a poll tax, it was less severe than any other former Confederate state.

Since the tail end of the 1900s, proposals to reform what was recognized as an inefficient and regressive tax system had become the major issue in North Carolina, especially after the Sixteenth Amendment was ratified.

Neither candidate campaigned in the state, which had voted Democratic at every election since 1876. At no point was there any serious question of Wilson carrying the state. On election day projections were for a majority for Wilson of between forty-five thousand and fifty thousand, which closely approximated the final result. Nonetheless, North Carolina was one of only three states where Wilson failed to improve upon his 1912 percentage, and indeed his 16.39 point win was three points smaller than conservative Democrat Alton B. Parker managed in 1904. Hughes, in fact, was the first Republican to ever carry Carteret and Clay Counties, suggesting latent opposition to Wilson in the Outer Banks and Appalachia.

== Results ==
Presidential Candidate	Running Mate	Party	Electoral Vote (EV)	Popular Vote (PV)	
Woodrow Wilson of New Jersey	Thomas R. Marshall	Democratic	12	168,383	58.10%
Charles Evans Hughes	Charles W. Fairbanks	Republican	0	120,890	41.71%
Allan L. Benson	George Kirkpatrick	Socialist	0	509	0.18%
Frank Hanly	Ira Landrith	Prohibition	0	53	0.02%

=== Results by county ===
1916 United States presidential election in North Carolina by county
County	Thomas Woodrow Wilson Democratic		Charles Evans Hughes Republican		Allan Louis Benson Socialist		James Franklin Hanly Prohibition		Margin	
County	%	#	%	#	%	#	%	#	%	#
Northampton	97.12%	1,518	2.88%	45	0.00%	0	0.00%	0	94.24%	1,473
Edgecombe	92.69%	2,028	6.17%	135	1.10%	24	0.05%	1	86.52%	1,893
Bertie	92.64%	1,461	7.36%	116	0.00%	0	0.00%	0	85.29%	1,345
Currituck	91.48%	945	8.42%	87	0.00%	0	0.10%	1	83.06%	858
Halifax	88.51%	2,312	11.45%	299	0.04%	1	0.00%	0	77.07%	2,013
Hoke	87.64%	780	12.36%	110	0.00%	0	0.00%	0	75.28%	670
Scotland	87.26%	938	12.74%	137	0.00%	0	0.00%	0	74.51%	801
Anson	87.18%	2,046	12.82%	301	0.00%	0	0.00%	0	74.35%	1,745
Chowan	86.89%	610	12.96%	91	0.00%	0	0.14%	1	73.93%	519
Warren	84.28%	1,217	15.72%	227	0.00%	0	0.00%	0	68.56%	990
Martin	83.97%	1,472	16.03%	281	0.00%	0	0.00%	0	67.94%	1,191
Franklin	83.86%	2,057	16.14%	396	0.00%	0	0.00%	0	67.71%	1,661
New Hanover	82.72%	2,355	17.28%	492	0.00%	0	0.00%	0	65.44%	1,863
Hertford	82.31%	977	17.61%	209	0.00%	0	0.08%	1	64.70%	768
Pasquotank	81.28%	1,177	18.65%	270	0.00%	0	0.07%	1	62.64%	907
Camden	80.70%	368	18.86%	86	0.00%	0	0.44%	2	61.84%	282
Pitt	79.79%	2,839	20.21%	719	0.00%	0	0.00%	0	59.58%	2,120
Union	79.04%	2,662	20.84%	702	0.12%	4	0.00%	0	58.19%	1,960
Greene	78.38%	1,066	21.62%	294	0.00%	0	0.00%	0	56.76%	772
Mecklenburg	78.11%	4,508	21.78%	1,257	0.10%	6	0.00%	0	56.33%	3,251
Craven	76.66%	1,780	23.34%	542	0.00%	0	0.00%	0	53.32%	1,238
Jones	75.34%	712	24.66%	233	0.00%	0	0.00%	0	50.69%	479
Hyde	74.73%	840	24.64%	277	0.36%	4	0.27%	3	50.09%	563
Wilson	73.76%	2,052	26.24%	730	0.00%	0	0.00%	0	47.52%	1,322
Gates	72.78%	826	27.22%	309	0.00%	0	0.00%	0	45.55%	517
Granville	72.55%	1,713	27.45%	648	0.00%	0	0.00%	0	45.11%	1,065
Nash	72.15%	2,189	27.22%	826	0.63%	19	0.00%	0	44.92%	1,363
Vance	72.22%	1,451	27.78%	558	0.00%	0	0.00%	0	44.45%	893
Caswell	71.52%	849	28.48%	338	0.00%	0	0.00%	0	43.05%	511
Lenoir	71.35%	1,666	28.57%	667	0.09%	2	0.00%	0	42.78%	999
Pender	70.80%	970	29.20%	400	0.00%	0	0.00%	0	41.61%	570
Richmond	70.49%	1,553	29.51%	650	0.00%	0	0.00%	0	40.99%	903
Perquimans	69.06%	645	30.84%	288	0.00%	0	0.11%	1	38.22%	357
Robeson	66.57%	2,894	33.43%	1,453	0.00%	0	0.00%	0	33.15%	1,441
Bladen	65.95%	1,261	34.05%	651	0.00%	0	0.00%	0	31.90%	610
Wake	65.23%	4,627	34.70%	2,461	0.07%	5	0.00%	0	30.54%	2,166
Cleveland	64.87%	2,764	35.13%	1,497	0.00%	0	0.00%	0	29.73%	1,267
Lee	64.78%	1,054	35.22%	573	0.00%	0	0.00%	0	29.56%	481
Wayne	64.40%	2,625	35.48%	1,446	0.07%	3	0.05%	2	28.93%	1,179
Cumberland	61.83%	1,971	38.17%	1,217	0.00%	0	0.00%	0	23.65%	754
Columbus	61.72%	2,143	38.22%	1,327	0.00%	0	0.06%	2	23.50%	816
Iredell	61.67%	3,335	38.33%	2,073	0.00%	0	0.00%	0	23.34%	1,262
Haywood	61.21%	2,403	38.79%	1,523	0.00%	0	0.00%	0	22.41%	880
Beaufort	60.55%	1,957	39.42%	1,274	0.00%	0	0.03%	1	21.13%	683
Onslow	60.27%	1,197	39.53%	785	0.00%	0	0.20%	4	20.75%	412
Pamlico	56.57%	710	41.99%	527	1.43%	18	0.00%	0	14.58%	183
Durham	57.28%	2,463	42.72%	1,837	0.00%	0	0.00%	0	14.56%	626
Washington	57.26%	651	42.74%	486	0.00%	0	0.00%	0	14.51%	165
Rowan	56.82%	3,053	43.18%	2,320	0.00%	0	0.00%	0	13.64%	733
Rutherford	56.65%	2,445	43.35%	1,871	0.00%	0	0.00%	0	13.30%	574
Dare	56.42%	470	43.58%	363	0.00%	0	0.00%	0	12.85%	107
Moore	55.57%	1,337	43.52%	1,047	0.91%	22	0.00%	0	12.05%	290
Guilford	55.41%	4,616	44.06%	3,670	0.53%	44	0.00%	0	11.36%	946
Harnett	55.29%	1,992	44.49%	1,603	0.22%	8	0.00%	0	10.80%	389
Alleghany	55.39%	796	44.61%	641	0.00%	0	0.00%	0	10.79%	155
Chatham	54.83%	1,839	44.75%	1,501	0.42%	14	0.00%	0	10.08%	338
Johnston	54.83%	3,468	45.17%	2,857	0.00%	0	0.00%	0	9.66%	611
Duplin	54.43%	1,824	45.57%	1,527	0.00%	0	0.00%	0	8.86%	297
Gaston	54.18%	3,019	45.62%	2,542	0.00%	0	0.20%	11	8.56%	477
Rockingham	54.20%	2,316	45.80%	1,957	0.00%	0	0.00%	0	8.40%	359
Yancey	54.06%	1,273	45.94%	1,082	0.00%	0	0.00%	0	8.11%	191
Forsyth	51.84%	4,115	45.16%	3,585	3.00%	238	0.00%	0	6.68%	530
Lincoln	52.47%	1,521	47.22%	1,369	0.28%	8	0.03%	1	5.24%	152
Buncombe	52.48%	4,229	47.52%	3,830	0.00%	0	0.00%	0	4.95%	399
Burke	52.37%	1,621	47.63%	1,474	0.00%	0	0.00%	0	4.75%	147
Stanly	51.97%	2,110	47.81%	1,941	0.12%	5	0.10%	4	4.16%	169
Alamance	52.03%	2,476	47.87%	2,278	0.11%	5	0.00%	0	4.16%	198
Macon	51.74%	1,146	48.26%	1,069	0.00%	0	0.00%	0	3.48%	77
Orange	51.51%	1,230	48.49%	1,158	0.00%	0	0.00%	0	3.02%	72
Tyrrell	51.49%	416	48.51%	392	0.00%	0	0.00%	0	2.97%	24
McDowell	51.08%	1,274	48.84%	1,218	0.00%	0	0.08%	2	2.25%	56
Caldwell	50.98%	1,725	49.02%	1,659	0.00%	0	0.00%	0	1.95%	66
Person	50.96%	953	49.04%	917	0.00%	0	0.00%	0	1.93%	36
Graham	50.85%	476	49.15%	460	0.00%	0	0.00%	0	1.71%	16
Montgomery	50.54%	1,222	49.46%	1,196	0.00%	0	0.00%	0	1.08%	26
Jackson	50.35%	1,306	49.65%	1,288	0.00%	0	0.00%	0	0.69%	18
Cherokee	50.00%	1,362	50.00%	1,362	0.00%	0	0.00%	0	0.00%	0
Catawba	49.34%	2,569	50.39%	2,624	0.08%	4	0.19%	10	-1.06%	-55
Ashe	49.47%	1,898	50.53%	1,939	0.00%	0	0.00%	0	-1.07%	-41
Transylvania	49.40%	821	50.60%	841	0.00%	0	0.00%	0	-1.20%	-20
Davidson	48.74%	2,675	51.04%	2,801	0.22%	12	0.00%	0	-2.30%	-126
Carteret	48.32%	1,165	51.68%	1,246	0.00%	0	0.00%	0	-3.36%	-81
Randolph	47.52%	2,747	52.43%	3,031	0.00%	0	0.05%	3	-4.91%	-284
Polk	47.48%	679	52.45%	750	0.07%	1	0.00%	0	-4.97%	-71
Cabarrus	47.10%	2,080	52.40%	2,314	0.50%	22	0.00%	0	-5.30%	-234
Clay	46.89%	400	53.11%	453	0.00%	0	0.00%	0	-6.21%	-53
Stokes	45.58%	1,569	53.81%	1,852	0.61%	21	0.00%	0	-8.22%	-283
Watauga	45.77%	1,141	54.23%	1,352	0.00%	0	0.00%	0	-8.46%	-211
Brunswick	45.00%	810	54.94%	989	0.06%	1	0.00%	0	-9.94%	-179
Alexander	44.56%	954	55.44%	1,187	0.00%	0	0.00%	0	-10.88%	-233
Swain	42.36%	829	57.64%	1,128	0.00%	0	0.00%	0	-15.28%	-299
Davie	42.11%	910	57.61%	1,245	0.28%	6	0.00%	0	-15.50%	-335
Surry	40.43%	2,029	59.33%	2,977	0.24%	12	0.00%	0	-18.89%	-948
Henderson	39.38%	1,166	60.62%	1,795	0.00%	0	0.00%	0	-21.24%	-629
Yadkin	33.81%	879	66.19%	1,721	0.00%	0	0.00%	0	-32.38%	-842
Sampson	33.42%	1,369	66.58%	2,727	0.00%	0	0.00%	0	-33.15%	-1,358
Madison	33.09%	972	66.91%	1,965	0.00%	0	0.00%	0	-33.81%	-993
Wilkes	31.99%	1,632	68.01%	3,470	0.00%	0	0.00%	0	-36.03%	-1,838
Mitchell	26.25%	462	73.75%	1,298	0.00%	0	0.00%	0	-47.50%	-836
Avery	23.68%	360	76.18%	1,158	0.00%	0	0.13%	2	-52.50%	-798
