= 1916 United States presidential election in Nebraska =

- November 7, 1916

All 8 Nebraska votes to the Electoral College

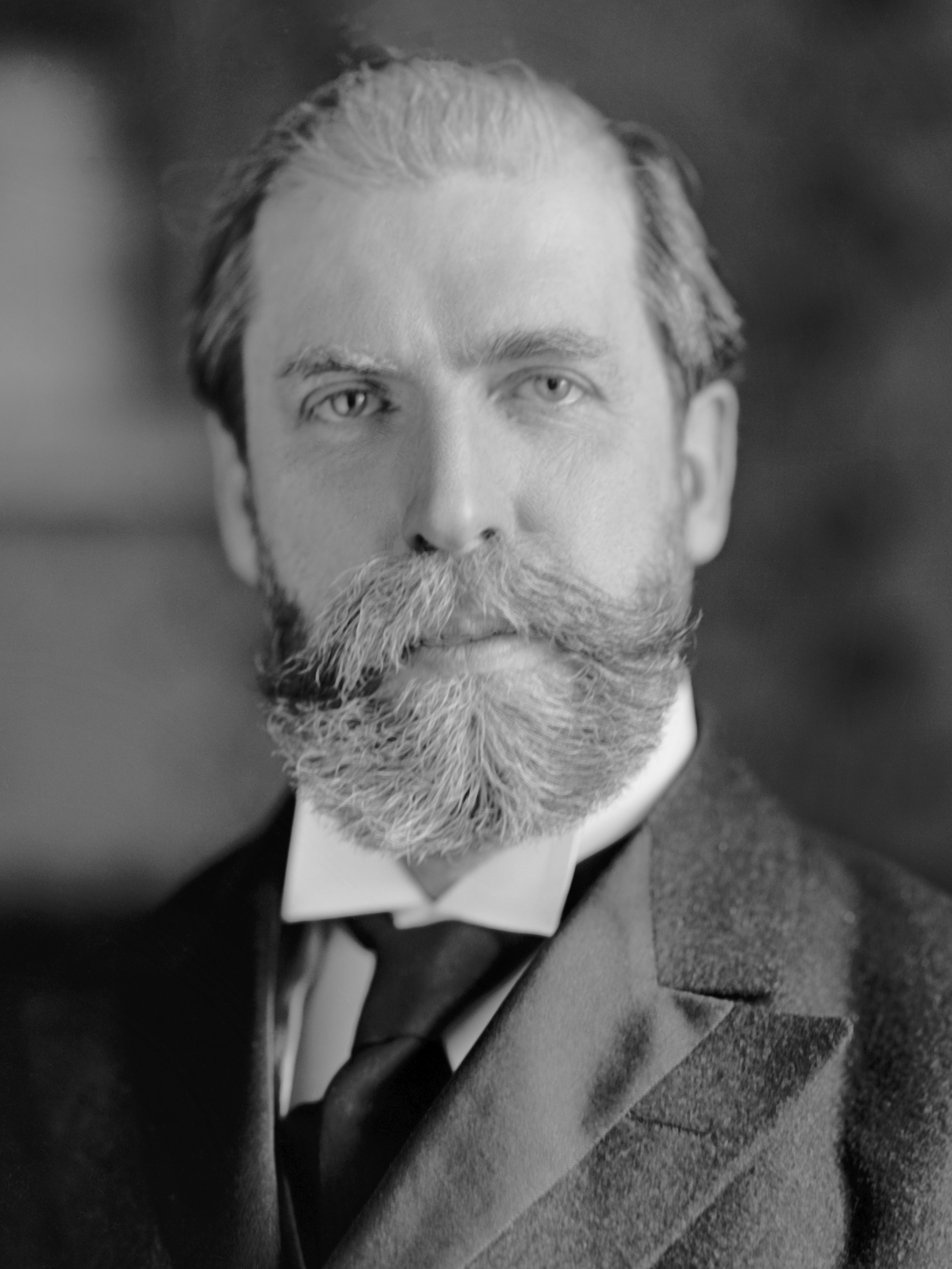
Nominee	Woodrow Wilson	Charles Evans Hughes
Party	Democratic	Republican
Home state	New Jersey	New York
Running mate	Thomas R. Marshall	Charles W. Fairbanks
Electoral vote	8	0
Popular vote	158,827	117,771
Percentage	55.28%	40.99%
County results
Wilson
40–50%
50–60%
60–70%
Hughes
40–50%
50–60%
President before election
Woodrow Wilson
Democratic
Elected President
Woodrow Wilson
Democratic

The 1916 United States presidential election in Nebraska took place on November 7, 1916, as part of the 1916 United States presidential election. Voters chose eight representatives, or electors, to the Electoral College, who voted for president and vice president.

Nebraska was won by incumbent President Woodrow Wilson (D–Virginia), and incumbent Vice-president Thomas R. Marshall, with 55.28% of the popular vote, against former and future Supreme Court Justice Charles Evans Hughes (R–New York), running with the 26th vice president of the United States Charles W. Fairbanks, with 40.99% of the popular vote. This made Nebraska more than 6% more Democratic than the nation as a whole, possibly as a result of opposition to World War I. As of the 2024 presidential election, this is the last occasion when Keya Paha County voted for a Democratic presidential candidate.

== Results ==
Presidential Candidate	Running Mate	Party	Electoral Vote (EV)	Popular Vote (PV)	
Woodrow Wilson of New Jersey	Thomas R. Marshall	Democratic	8	158,827	55.28%
Charles Evans Hughes	Charles W. Fairbanks	Republican	0	117,771	40.99%
Allan L. Benson	George Ross Kirkpatrick	Socialist	0	7,141	2.49%
Frank Hanly	Ira Landrith	Prohibition	0	2,952	1.03%
Arthur E. Reimer	Caleb Harrison	Socialist Labor	0	624	0.22%

=== Results by county ===
County	Thomas Woodrow Wilson Democratic		Charles Evans Hughes Republican		Allan Louis Benson Socialist		James Franklin Hanly Prohibition		Arthur Elmer Reimer Socialist Labor		Margin		Total votes cast
County	#	%	#	%	#	%	#	%	#	%	#	%	Total votes cast
Adams	2,657	54.58%	2,041	41.93%	98	2.01%	64	1.31%	8	0.16%	616	12.65%	4,868
Antelope	1,881	54.52%	1,495	43.33%	32	0.93%	41	1.19%	1	0.03%	386	11.19%	3,450
Arthur	286	64.27%	143	32.13%	9	2.02%	3	0.67%	4	0.90%	143	32.13%	445
Banner	166	50.00%	142	42.77%	17	5.12%	1	0.30%	6	1.81%	24	7.23%	332
Blaine	246	54.42%	184	40.71%	13	2.88%	9	1.99%	0	0.00%	62	13.72%	452
Boone	2,005	60.61%	1,225	37.03%	35	1.06%	36	1.09%	7	0.21%	780	23.58%	3,308
Box Butte	914	58.22%	591	37.64%	28	1.78%	23	1.46%	14	0.89%	323	20.57%	1,570
Boyd	852	49.48%	809	46.98%	47	2.73%	12	0.70%	2	0.12%	43	2.50%	1,722
Brown	901	59.91%	528	35.11%	42	2.79%	17	1.13%	16	1.06%	373	24.80%	1,504
Buffalo	2,877	54.25%	2,216	41.79%	136	2.56%	63	1.19%	11	0.21%	661	12.46%	5,303
Burt	1,425	47.56%	1,508	50.33%	23	0.77%	24	0.80%	16	0.53%	-83	-2.77%	2,996
Butler	2,332	66.42%	1,120	31.90%	35	1.00%	21	0.60%	3	0.09%	1,212	34.52%	3,511
Cass	2,595	54.93%	1,927	40.79%	135	2.86%	61	1.29%	6	0.13%	668	14.14%	4,724
Cedar	1,715	49.13%	1,727	49.47%	21	0.60%	26	0.74%	2	0.06%	-12	-0.34%	3,491
Chase	551	55.83%	369	37.39%	40	4.05%	21	2.13%	6	0.61%	182	18.44%	987
Cherry	1,734	57.92%	1,091	36.44%	124	4.14%	34	1.14%	11	0.37%	643	21.48%	2,994
Cheyenne	834	56.62%	563	38.22%	41	2.78%	24	1.63%	11	0.75%	271	18.40%	1,473
Clay	1,975	51.69%	1,737	45.46%	69	1.81%	33	0.86%	7	0.18%	238	6.23%	3,821
Colfax	1,628	63.13%	897	34.78%	47	1.82%	6	0.23%	1	0.04%	731	28.34%	2,579
Cuming	1,424	46.86%	1,551	51.04%	51	1.68%	9	0.30%	4	0.13%	-127	-4.18%	3,039
Custer	3,609	60.37%	2,047	34.24%	227	3.80%	83	1.39%	12	0.20%	1,562	26.13%	5,978
Dakota	1,032	61.47%	612	36.45%	22	1.31%	10	0.60%	3	0.18%	420	25.01%	1,679
Dawes	1,088	57.11%	751	39.42%	49	2.57%	16	0.84%	1	0.05%	337	17.69%	1,905
Dawson	1,989	56.12%	1,444	40.74%	60	1.69%	42	1.19%	9	0.25%	545	15.38%	3,544
Deuel	340	62.50%	181	33.27%	16	2.94%	4	0.74%	3	0.55%	159	29.23%	544
Dixon	1,350	51.63%	1,208	46.20%	29	1.11%	28	1.07%	0	0.00%	142	5.43%	2,615
Dodge	2,644	49.83%	2,446	46.10%	160	3.02%	50	0.94%	6	0.11%	198	3.73%	5,306
Douglas	24,796	59.84%	14,557	35.13%	1,755	4.24%	294	0.71%	35	0.08%	10,239	24.71%	41,437
Dundy	570	58.34%	347	35.52%	43	4.40%	17	1.74%	0	0.00%	223	22.82%	977
Fillmore	1,911	53.80%	1,561	43.95%	42	1.18%	35	0.99%	3	0.08%	350	9.85%	3,552
Franklin	1,345	53.80%	1,081	43.24%	38	1.52%	26	1.04%	10	0.40%	264	10.56%	2,500
Frontier	1,138	57.65%	736	37.28%	67	3.39%	28	1.42%	5	0.25%	402	20.36%	1,974
Furnas	1,607	55.90%	1,163	40.45%	43	1.50%	53	1.84%	9	0.31%	444	15.44%	2,875
Gage	3,385	48.74%	3,383	48.71%	83	1.20%	74	1.07%	20	0.29%	2	0.03%	6,945
Garden	598	62.55%	306	32.01%	34	3.56%	15	1.57%	3	0.31%	292	30.54%	956
Garfield	426	52.79%	302	37.42%	57	7.06%	11	1.36%	11	1.36%	124	15.37%	807
Gosper	617	56.87%	434	40.00%	20	1.84%	11	1.01%	3	0.28%	183	16.87%	1,085
Grant	241	59.21%	157	38.57%	6	1.47%	3	0.74%	0	0.00%	84	20.64%	407
Greeley	1,289	64.97%	627	31.60%	43	2.17%	17	0.86%	8	0.40%	662	33.37%	1,984
Hall	2,483	47.17%	2,555	48.54%	159	3.02%	61	1.16%	6	0.11%	-72	-1.37%	5,264
Hamilton	1,816	54.27%	1,444	43.16%	31	0.93%	49	1.46%	6	0.18%	372	11.12%	3,346
Harlan	1,267	56.94%	834	37.48%	95	4.27%	27	1.21%	2	0.09%	433	19.46%	2,225
Hayes	382	58.14%	219	33.33%	39	5.94%	9	1.37%	8	1.22%	163	24.81%	657
Hitchcock	733	60.93%	435	36.16%	25	2.08%	9	0.75%	1	0.08%	298	24.77%	1,203
Holt	2,213	56.73%	1,568	40.19%	77	1.97%	38	0.97%	5	0.13%	645	16.53%	3,901
Hooker	218	64.50%	109	32.25%	3	0.89%	7	2.07%	1	0.30%	109	32.25%	338
Howard	1,695	68.18%	698	28.08%	54	2.17%	21	0.84%	18	0.72%	997	40.10%	2,486
Jefferson	1,841	47.57%	1,813	46.85%	177	4.57%	38	0.98%	1	0.03%	28	0.72%	3,870
Johnson	1,117	44.26%	1,373	54.40%	14	0.55%	15	0.59%	5	0.20%	-256	-10.14%	2,524
Kearney	1,396	62.83%	760	34.20%	46	2.07%	19	0.86%	1	0.05%	636	28.62%	2,222
Keith	544	54.62%	389	39.06%	46	4.62%	11	1.10%	6	0.60%	155	15.56%	996
Keya Paha	401	50.44%	316	39.75%	40	5.03%	13	1.64%	25	3.14%	85	10.69%	795
Kimball	388	59.78%	223	34.36%	20	3.08%	13	2.00%	5	0.77%	165	25.42%	649
Knox	2,329	53.79%	1,910	44.11%	53	1.22%	29	0.67%	9	0.21%	419	9.68%	4,330
Lancaster	9,093	54.49%	7,042	42.20%	314	1.88%	232	1.39%	7	0.04%	2,051	12.29%	16,688
Lincoln	2,192	57.96%	1,309	34.61%	213	5.63%	40	1.06%	28	0.74%	883	23.35%	3,782
Logan	283	57.76%	172	35.10%	25	5.10%	8	1.63%	2	0.41%	111	22.65%	490
Loup	219	50.81%	164	38.05%	36	8.35%	8	1.86%	4	0.93%	55	12.76%	431
Madison	2,358	48.15%	2,428	49.58%	47	0.96%	42	0.86%	22	0.45%	-70	-1.43%	4,897
McPherson	184	57.86%	106	33.33%	15	4.72%	9	2.83%	4	1.26%	78	24.53%	318
Merrick	1,349	51.33%	1,178	44.82%	49	1.86%	50	1.90%	2	0.08%	171	6.51%	2,628
Morrill	888	62.18%	470	32.91%	57	3.99%	12	0.84%	1	0.07%	418	29.27%	1,428
Nance	1,165	54.57%	930	43.56%	17	0.80%	18	0.84%	5	0.23%	235	11.01%	2,135
Nemaha	1,658	52.15%	1,438	45.23%	46	1.45%	34	1.07%	3	0.09%	220	6.92%	3,179
Nuckolls	1,732	53.41%	1,411	43.51%	70	2.16%	28	0.86%	2	0.06%	321	9.90%	3,243
Otoe	2,344	51.34%	2,121	46.45%	53	1.16%	40	0.88%	8	0.18%	223	4.88%	4,566
Pawnee	1,171	47.35%	1,228	49.66%	33	1.33%	41	1.66%	0	0.00%	-57	-2.30%	2,473
Perkins	397	60.61%	210	32.06%	41	6.26%	5	0.76%	2	0.31%	187	28.55%	655
Phelps	1,425	56.66%	971	38.61%	71	2.82%	42	1.67%	6	0.24%	454	18.05%	2,515
Pierce	1,030	44.96%	1,228	53.60%	15	0.65%	17	0.74%	1	0.04%	-198	-8.64%	2,291
Platte	2,412	54.76%	1,918	43.54%	41	0.93%	27	0.61%	7	0.16%	494	11.21%	4,405
Polk	1,600	57.80%	1,060	38.29%	46	1.66%	50	1.81%	12	0.43%	540	19.51%	2,768
Red Willow	1,418	55.20%	977	38.03%	144	5.61%	17	0.66%	13	0.51%	441	17.17%	2,569
Richardson	2,650	54.98%	2,039	42.30%	64	1.33%	66	1.37%	1	0.02%	611	12.68%	4,820
Rock	449	51.08%	375	42.66%	46	5.23%	7	0.80%	2	0.23%	74	8.42%	879
Saline	2,646	63.23%	1,469	35.10%	32	0.76%	27	0.65%	11	0.26%	1,177	28.12%	4,185
Sarpy	1,320	58.46%	885	39.19%	33	1.46%	17	0.75%	3	0.13%	435	19.26%	2,258
Saunders	2,671	55.73%	1,957	40.83%	89	1.86%	66	1.38%	10	0.21%	714	14.90%	4,793
Scotts Bluff	1,587	54.07%	1,144	38.98%	169	5.76%	30	1.02%	5	0.17%	443	15.09%	2,935
Seward	1,797	48.54%	1,855	50.11%	24	0.65%	22	0.59%	4	0.11%	-58	-1.57%	3,702
Sheridan	1,158	62.02%	604	32.35%	74	3.96%	27	1.45%	4	0.21%	554	29.67%	1,867
Sherman	1,208	59.57%	706	34.81%	79	3.90%	19	0.94%	16	0.79%	502	24.75%	2,028
Sioux	737	65.34%	344	30.50%	33	2.93%	14	1.24%	0	0.00%	393	34.84%	1,128
Stanton	899	53.64%	736	43.91%	17	1.01%	15	0.89%	9	0.54%	163	9.73%	1,676
Thayer	1,581	45.73%	1,772	51.26%	74	2.14%	30	0.87%	0	0.00%	-191	-5.53%	3,457
Thomas	261	48.97%	244	45.78%	18	3.38%	6	1.13%	4	0.75%	17	3.19%	533
Thurston	1,255	62.47%	717	35.69%	26	1.29%	11	0.55%	0	0.00%	538	26.78%	2,009
Valley	1,388	60.22%	840	36.44%	51	2.21%	15	0.65%	11	0.48%	548	23.77%	2,305
Washington	1,555	52.71%	1,297	43.97%	76	2.58%	20	0.68%	2	0.07%	258	8.75%	2,950
Wayne	1,006	44.36%	1,208	53.26%	19	0.84%	29	1.28%	6	0.26%	-202	-8.91%	2,268
Webster	1,469	53.01%	1,191	42.98%	61	2.20%	46	1.66%	4	0.14%	278	10.03%	2,771
Wheeler	270	54.66%	163	33.00%	59	11.94%	2	0.40%	0	0.00%	107	21.66%	494
York	2,206	50.70%	2,011	46.22%	48	1.10%	59	1.36%	27	0.62%	195	4.48%	4,351
Totals	158,827	55.28%	117,771	40.99%	7,141	2.49%	2,952	1.03%	624	0.22%	41,056	14.29%	287,315

== See also ==
- United States presidential elections in Nebraska
