= 1916 United States presidential election in Maryland =

- November 7, 1916

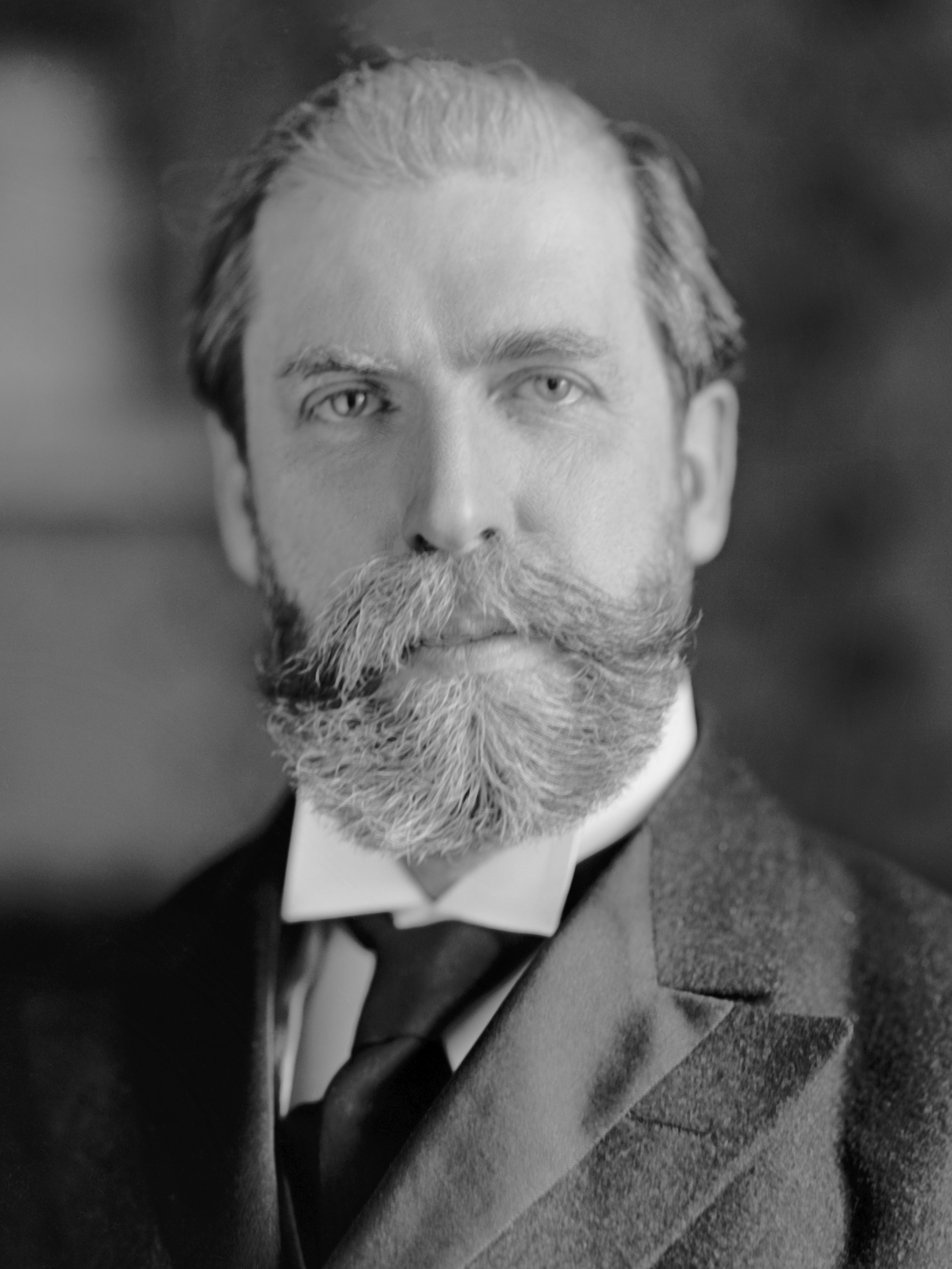
Nominee	Woodrow Wilson	Charles Evans Hughes
Party	Democratic	Republican
Home state	New Jersey	New York
Running mate	Thomas R. Marshall	Charles W. Fairbanks
Electoral vote	8	0
Popular vote	138,359	117,347
Percentage	52.80%	44.78%
County results
Wilson
50–60%
60–70%
Hughes
40–50%
50–60%
60–70%
President before election
Woodrow Wilson
Democratic
Elected President
Woodrow Wilson
Democratic

The 1916 United States presidential election in Maryland took place on November 7, 1916, as part of the 1916 United States presidential election which was held throughout all contemporary 48 states. Voters chose eight representatives, or electors to the Electoral College, who voted for president and vice president.

With its history as a slave state and substantial historic secessionist support, Maryland had been strongly Democratic during the Third Party System despite having Federalist and Whig tendencies under previous systems. However, hostility towards William Jennings Bryan’s free silver and Populist tendencies in the cities meant that the state shifted Republican in 1896 and became very close in subsequent elections during the “System of 1896”. Unlike former Confederate states and Oklahoma, Maryland did not succeed in disenfranchising its large black population despite several attempts, which helped the Republicans remain highly competitive in early twentieth-century state elections.

The previous three elections had seen Maryland as the strongest Democratic state outside the former Confederacy. Despite this, and the fact that four members of the state’s Progressive Party committee refused to endorse the reunified Republicans under Charles Evans Hughes, leading GOP Senator Reed Smoot said late in September that he was confident Maryland could go Republican, although the poll still suggested Wilson would win narrowly. Wilson did not campaign in the state at all, but Hughes’ campaign made a brief visit during the second week of October, which was not regarded as successful.

Two days before the poll, Maryland was regarded as doubtful, although there had been reports of a continued swing to Wilson a week previously. As it turned out, the earlier prediction proved the better guide, with Wilson winning by 8.02 percent for his strongest performance in any antebellum Union state, and becoming the first Democrat to win an absolute majority in Maryland since Grover Cleveland in 1892. In this election, Maryland voted 4.9% more Democratic than the nation at-large.

== Results ==
Presidential Candidate	Running Mate	Party	Electoral Vote (EV)	Popular Vote (PV)	
Woodrow Wilson of New Jersey (incumbent)	Thomas R. Marshall (incumbent)	Democratic	8	138,359	52.80%
Charles Evans Hughes	Charles W. Fairbanks	Republican	0	117,347	44.78%
Frank Hanly	Ira Landrith	Prohibition	0	2,903	1.11%
Allan L. Benson	George Ross Kirkpatrick	Socialist	0	2,674	1.02%
Arthur E. Reimer	Caleb Harrison	Labor	0	756	0.29%

=== Results by county ===
County	Woodrow Wilson Democratic		Charles E. Hughes Republican		Frank Hanly Prohibition		Allan L. Benson Socialist		Arthur E. Reimer Labor		Margin		Total votes cast
County	#	%	#	%	#	%	#	%	#	%	#	%	Total votes cast
Allegany	4,859	43.49%	5,760	51.56%	147	1.32%	377	3.37%	29	0.26%	-901	-8.06%	11,172
Anne Arundel	4,111	57.77%	2,705	38.01%	134	1.88%	137	1.93%	29	0.41%	1,406	19.76%	7,116
Baltimore	15,226	53.60%	12,633	44.47%	336	1.18%	158	0.56%	53	0.19%	2,593	9.13%	28,406
Baltimore City	60,226	53.58%	49,805	44.31%	836	0.74%	1,216	1.08%	330	0.29%	10,421	9.27%	112,413
Calvert	910	46.50%	975	49.82%	37	1.89%	27	1.38%	8	0.41%	-65	-3.32%	1,957
Caroline	1,965	52.94%	1,666	44.88%	55	1.48%	7	0.19%	19	0.51%	299	8.05%	3,712
Carroll	4,016	51.66%	3,602	46.33%	108	1.39%	16	0.21%	32	0.41%	414	5.33%	7,774
Cecil	2,587	55.91%	1,959	42.34%	42	0.91%	13	0.28%	26	0.56%	628	13.57%	4,627
Charles	1,363	47.67%	1,374	48.06%	80	2.80%	9	0.31%	33	1.15%	-11	-0.38%	2,859
Dorchester	2,750	51.69%	2,468	46.39%	76	1.43%	11	0.21%	15	0.28%	282	5.30%	5,320
Frederick	6,094	50.67%	5,725	47.61%	119	0.99%	75	0.62%	13	0.11%	369	3.07%	12,026
Garrett	1,031	34.90%	1,808	61.21%	35	1.18%	67	2.27%	13	0.44%	-777	-26.30%	2,954
Harford	3,345	58.36%	2,302	40.16%	60	1.05%	16	0.28%	9	0.16%	1,043	18.20%	5,732
Howard	1,913	57.57%	1,346	40.51%	35	1.05%	11	0.33%	18	0.54%	567	17.06%	3,323
Kent	1,886	52.29%	1,673	46.38%	20	0.55%	12	0.33%	16	0.44%	213	5.91%	3,607
Montgomery	3,805	55.52%	2,913	42.50%	85	1.24%	43	0.63%	8	0.12%	892	13.01%	6,854
Prince George's	3,493	51.87%	3,058	45.41%	76	1.13%	83	1.23%	24	0.36%	435	6.46%	6,734
Queen Anne's	2,206	63.05%	1,242	35.50%	43	1.23%	3	0.09%	5	0.14%	964	27.55%	3,499
Somerset	1,885	42.81%	2,364	53.69%	105	2.38%	38	0.86%	11	0.25%	-479	-10.88%	4,403
St. Mary's	1,443	55.27%	1,064	40.75%	57	2.18%	33	1.26%	14	0.54%	379	14.52%	2,611
Talbot	2,180	53.29%	1,753	42.85%	131	3.20%	19	0.46%	8	0.20%	427	10.44%	4,091
Washington	5,642	50.83%	5,093	45.88%	91	0.82%	267	2.41%	7	0.06%	549	4.95%	11,100
Wicomico	3,285	55.47%	2,539	42.87%	88	1.49%	5	0.08%	5	0.08%	746	12.60%	5,922
Worcester	2,138	55.87%	1,520	39.72%	107	2.80%	31	0.81%	31	0.81%	618	16.15%	3,827
Totals	138,359	52.80%	117,347	44.78%	2,903	1.11%	2,674	1.02%	756	0.29%	21,012	8.02%	262,039

==== Counties that flipped from Democratic to Republican ====
- Allegany

==== Counties that flipped from Progressive to Republican ====
- Garrett

== See also ==
- United States presidential elections in Maryland
- 1916 United States presidential election
- 1916 United States elections
