= 1916 United States presidential election in Florida =

- November 7, 1916

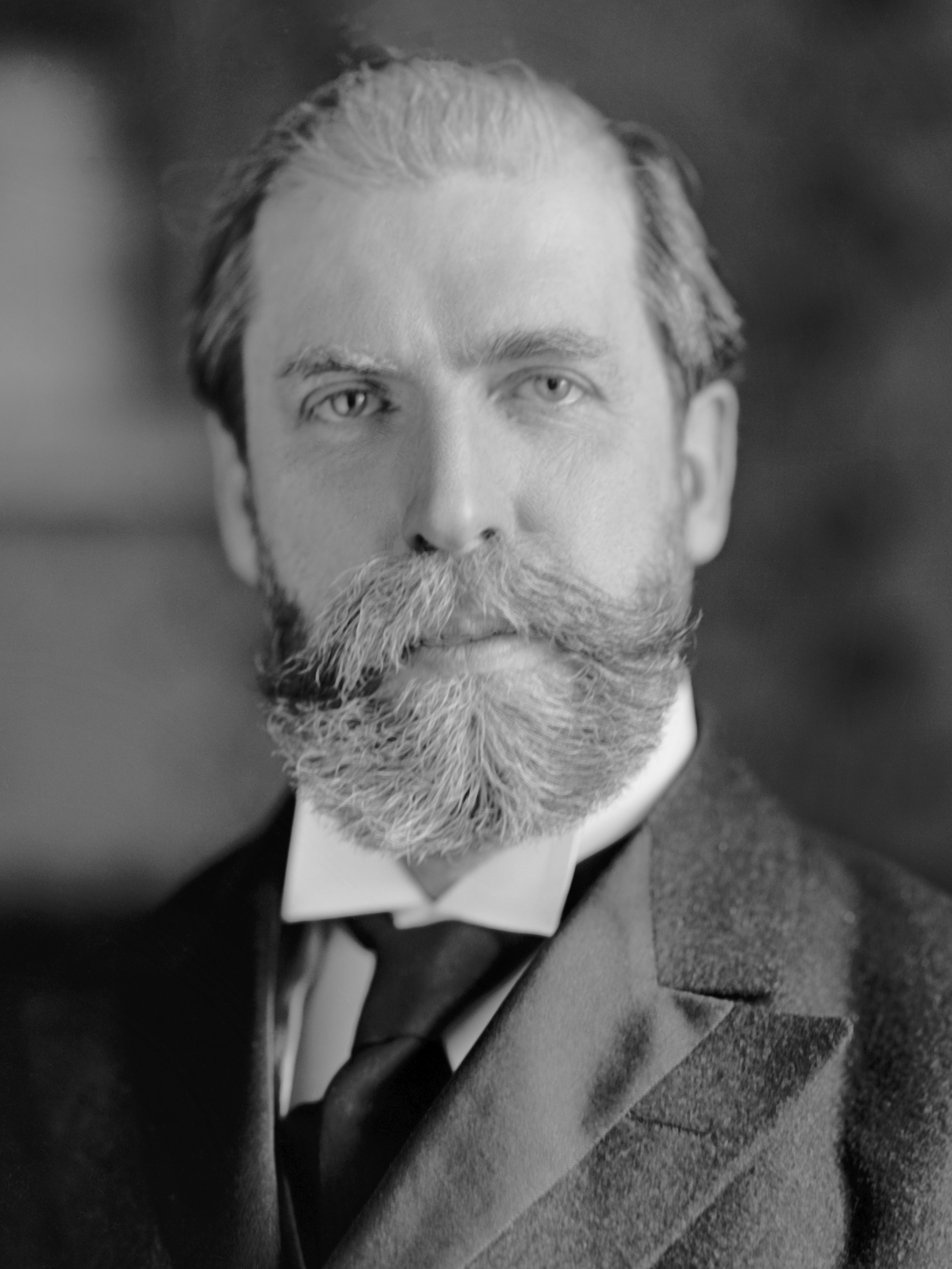

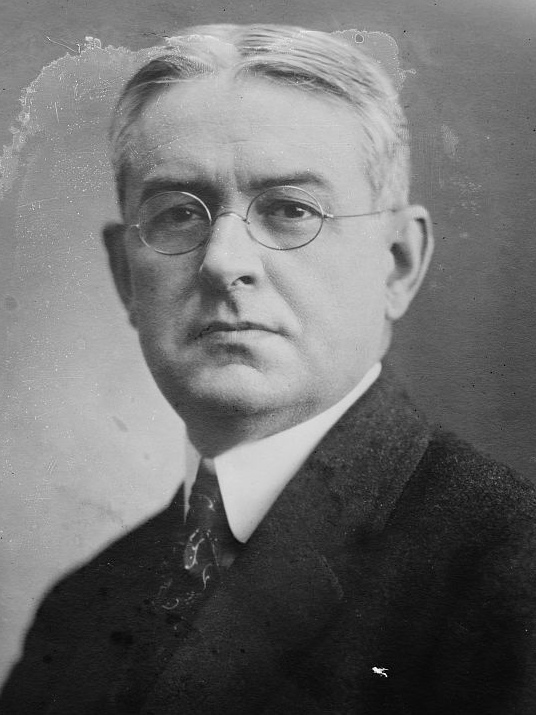

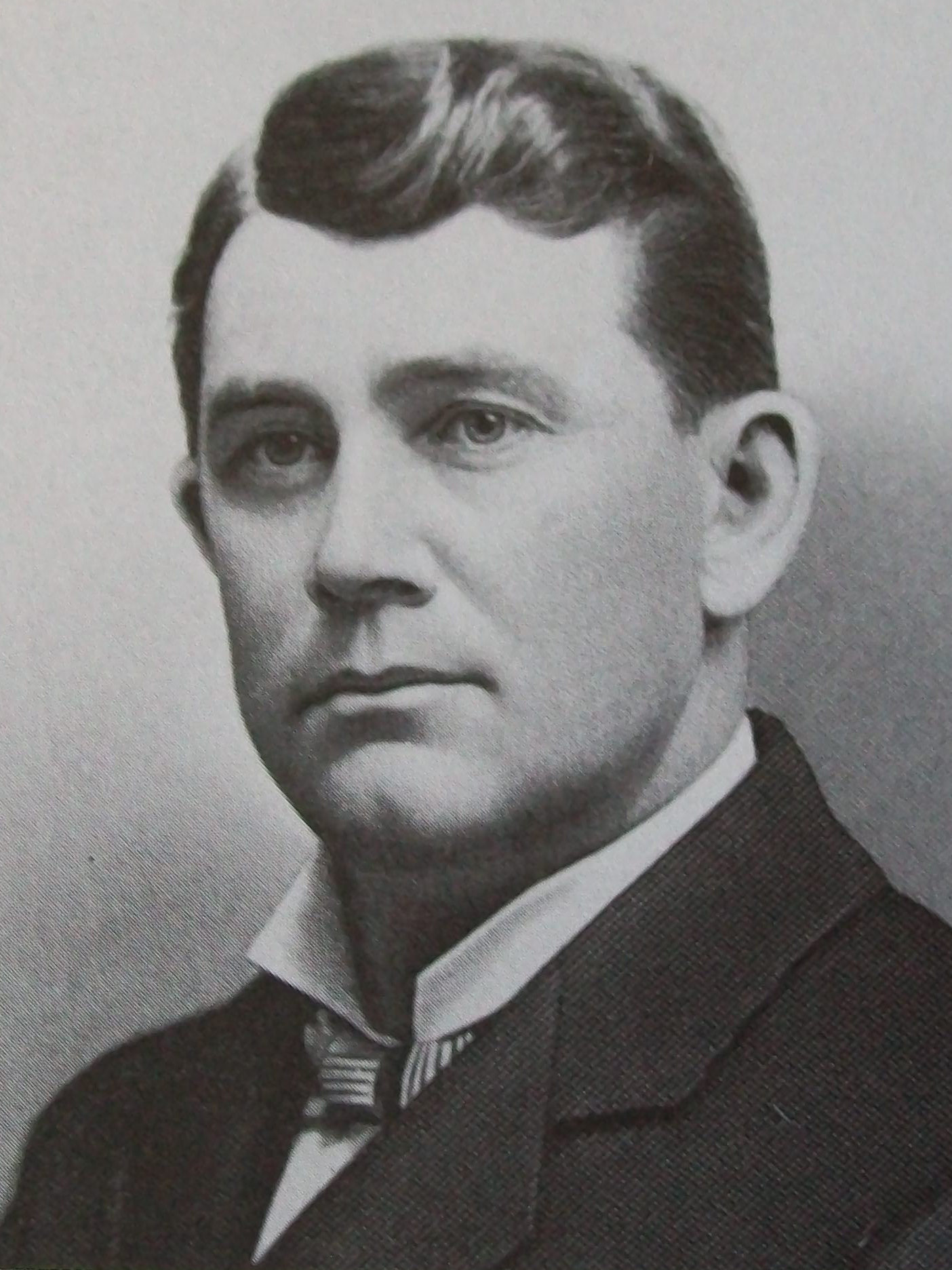
Nominee	Woodrow Wilson	Charles Evans Hughes
Party	Democratic	Republican
Home state	New Jersey	New York
Running mate	Thomas R. Marshall	Charles W. Fairbanks
Electoral vote	6	0
Popular vote	55,984	14,611
Percentage	69.34%	18.10%
Nominee	Allan L. Benson	Frank Hanly
Party	Socialist	Prohibition
Home state	New York	Indiana
Running mate	George Ross Kirkpatrick	Ira Landrith
Electoral vote	0	0
Popular vote	5,353	4,786
Percentage	6.63%	5.93%
County results
Wilson
40–50%
50–60%
60–70%
70–80%
80–90%
President before election
Woodrow Wilson
Democratic
Elected President
Woodrow Wilson
Democratic

The 1916 United States presidential election in Florida took place on November 7, 1916. All contemporary 48 states were part of the 1916 United States presidential election. Florida voters chose six electors to the Electoral College, which selected the President and Vice President.

Despite a rare four-way contest, the state was won handily by the incumbent Democratic President Woodrow Wilson. He garnered 69.34% of the vote, winning against the Republican nominee Charles Evans Hughes by a margin of 51.24%. He also won against Socialist candidate Allan L. Benson and Prohibition candidate Frank Hanly.

== Results ==
1916 United States presidential election in Florida
Party	Candidate	Running mate	Votes	Percentage	Electoral votes
Democratic	Woodrow Wilson	Thomas R. Marshall	55,984	69.34%	6
Republican	Charles Evans Hughes	Charles W. Fairbanks	14,611	18.10%	0
Socialist	Allan L. Benson	George Ross Kirkpatrick	5,353	6.63%	0
Prohibition	Frank Hanly	Ira Landrith	4,786	5.93%	0

=== Results by county ===
County	Thomas Woodrow Wilson Democratic		Charles Evans Hughes Republican		Allan Louis Benson Socialist		James Franklin Hanly Prohibition		Margin		Total votes cast
County	# (Note: County totals are for the average for each slate. State totals are the highest elector for each slate are greater than those obtained by adding the county averages.)	%	#	%	#	%	#	%	#	%	Total votes cast
Alachua	2,030	79.76%	440	17.29%	33	1.30%	42	1.65%	1,590	62.47%	2,545
Baker	439	78.11%	52	9.25%	30	5.34%	41	7.30%	347	68.86%	562
Bay	725	61.44%	279	23.64%	99	8.39%	77	6.53%	446	37.80%	1,180
Bradford	1,302	87.44%	153	10.28%	13	0.87%	21	1.41%	1,149	77.16%	1,489
Brevard	599	65.25%	174	18.95%	76	8.28%	69	7.52%	425	46.30%	918
Broward	382	54.57%	158	22.57%	110	15.71%	50	7.14%	224	32.00%	700
Calhoun	539	64.09%	209	24.85%	68	8.09%	25	2.97%	330	39.24%	841
Citrus	601	86.47%	46	6.62%	25	3.60%	23	3.31%	555	79.85%	695
Clay	380	68.72%	79	14.29%	47	8.50%	47	8.50%	301	54.43%	553
Columbia	861	72.60%	226	19.06%	28	2.36%	71	5.99%	635	53.54%	1,186
Dade	1,654	57.69%	629	21.94%	301	10.50%	283	9.87%	1,025	35.75%	2,867
DeSoto	1,755	68.13%	385	14.95%	228	8.85%	208	8.07%	1,370	53.18%	2,576
Duval	5,456	68.57%	1,339	16.83%	581	7.30%	581	7.30%	4,117	51.74%	7,957
Escambia	2,183	78.95%	416	15.05%	99	3.58%	67	2.42%	1,767	63.90%	2,765
Franklin	312	64.73%	81	16.80%	32	6.64%	57	11.83%	231	47.93%	482
Gadsden	875	84.95%	57	5.53%	40	3.88%	58	5.63%	817	79.32%	1,030
Hamilton	675	83.13%	113	13.92%	15	1.85%	9	1.11%	562	69.21%	812
Hernando	446	79.64%	38	6.79%	38	6.79%	38	6.79%	408	72.85%	560
Hillsborough	4,627	69.95%	691	10.45%	622	9.40%	675	10.20%	3,936	59.50%	6,615
Holmes	763	51.52%	427	28.83%	182	12.29%	109	7.36%	336	22.69%	1,481
Jackson	1,975	79.60%	410	16.53%	34	1.37%	62	2.50%	1,565	63.07%	2,481
Jefferson	646	85.11%	104	13.70%	4	0.53%	5	0.66%	542	71.81%	759
Lafayette	849	89.27%	45	4.73%	30	3.15%	27	2.84%	804	84.54%	951
Lake	886	67.79%	330	25.25%	68	5.20%	23	1.76%	556	42.54%	1,307
Lee	751	66.34%	167	14.75%	135	11.93%	79	6.98%	584	51.59%	1,132
Leon	875	74.79%	191	16.32%	42	3.59%	62	5.30%	684	58.47%	1,170
Levy	712	73.48%	216	22.29%	25	2.58%	16	1.65%	496	51.19%	969
Liberty	280	71.98%	57	14.65%	14	3.60%	38	9.77%	223	57.33%	389
Madison	721	89.79%	22	2.74%	22	2.74%	38	4.73%	683	85.06%	803
Manatee	1,033	66.73%	289	18.67%	116	7.49%	110	7.11%	744	48.06%	1,548
Marion	1,567	66.15%	462	19.50%	151	6.37%	189	7.98%	1,105	46.65%	2,369
Monroe	730	51.01%	345	24.11%	249	17.40%	107	7.48%	385	26.90%	1,431
Nassau	420	70.35%	94	15.75%	40	6.70%	43	7.20%	326	54.60%	597
Okaloosa	603	63.41%	303	31.86%	29	3.05%	16	1.68%	300	31.55%	951
Orange	1,261	71.77%	415	23.62%	51	2.90%	30	1.71%	846	48.15%	1,757
Osceola	511	43.98%	453	38.98%	100	8.61%	98	8.43%	58	5.00%	1,162
Palm Beach	725	51.67%	311	22.17%	194	13.83%	173	12.33%	414	29.50%	1,403
Pasco	779	65.41%	236	19.82%	82	6.88%	94	7.89%	543	45.59%	1,191
Pinellas	1,503	61.90%	555	22.86%	173	7.13%	197	8.11%	948	47.11%	2,428
Polk	2,574	76.13%	578	17.10%	158	4.67%	71	2.10%	1,996	59.03%	3,381
Putnam	879	60.29%	418	28.67%	93	6.38%	68	4.66%	461	31.62%	1,458
St. Johns	1,133	66.14%	326	19.03%	136	7.94%	118	6.89%	806	47.11%	1,713
St. Lucie	703	68.92%	134	13.14%	110	10.78%	73	7.16%	569	55.78%	1,020
Santa Rosa	896	82.58%	111	10.23%	19	1.75%	59	5.44%	785	72.35%	1,085
Seminole	706	70.88%	155	15.56%	80	8.03%	55	5.52%	551	55.32%	996
Sumter	599	80.62%	70	9.42%	30	4.04%	44	5.92%	529	71.20%	743
Suwannee	1,209	85.14%	56	3.94%	126	8.87%	29	2.04%	1,083	76.27%	1,420
Taylor	547	89.67%	51	8.36%	11	1.80%	1	0.16%	496	81.31%	610
Volusia	1,541	58.11%	886	33.41%	109	4.11%	116	4.37%	655	24.70%	2,652
Wakulla	387	68.74%	121	21.49%	32	5.68%	23	4.09%	266	47.25%	563
Walton	753	50.95%	549	37.14%	79	5.35%	97	6.56%	204	13.81%	1,478
Washington	626	62.41%	159	15.85%	144	14.36%	74	7.38%	467	46.56%	1,003
Totals	55,984	69.34%	14,611	18.10%	5,353	6.63%	4,786	5.93%	41,373	51.24%	79,731
