= 1916 United States presidential election in Mississippi =

- November 7, 1916

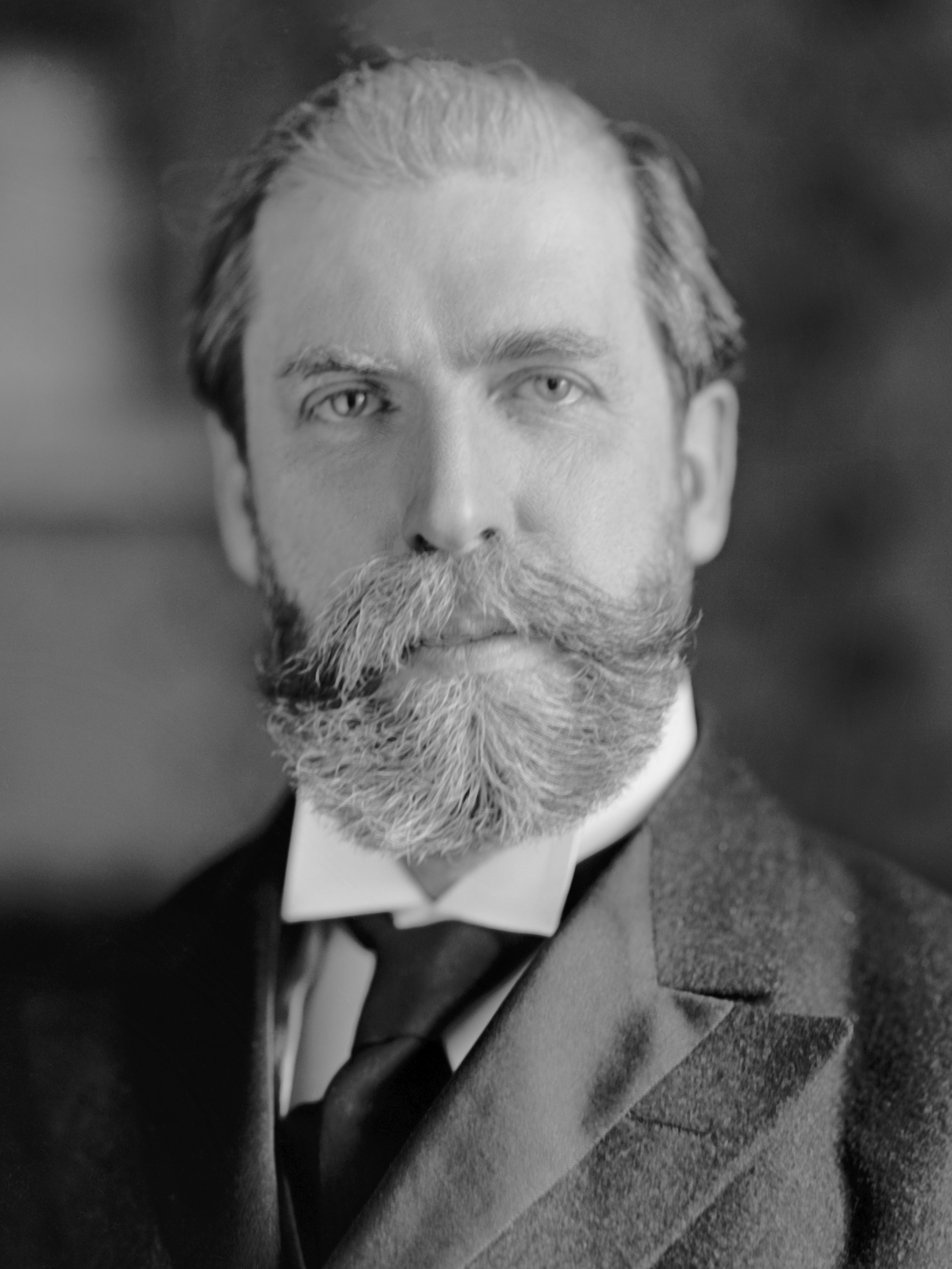
| Nominee | Woodrow Wilson | Charles Evans Hughes |
| Party | Democratic | Republican |
| Home state | New Jersey | New York |
| Running mate | Thomas R. Marshall | Charles W. Fairbanks |
| Electoral vote | 10 | 0 |
| Popular vote | 80,422 | 4,253 |
| Percentage | 92.78% | 4.91% |
County results
Wilson
70–80%
80–90%
90–100%
President before election
Woodrow Wilson
Democratic
Elected President
Woodrow Wilson
Democratic

The 1916 United States presidential election in Mississippi took place on November 7, 1916, as part of the 1916 United States presidential election which was held throughout all contemporary 48 states. Voters chose ten representatives, or electors to the Electoral College, who voted for president and vice president. In Mississippi, voters voted for electors individually instead of as a slate, as in the other states.

Mississippi was won by the Democratic nominees, incumbent Democratic President Woodrow Wilson and Vice President Thomas R. Marshall. They defeated Republican nominee, U.S. Supreme Court Justice Charles Evans Hughes of New York, and his running mate Senator Charles W. Fairbanks of Indiana.

Wilson won Mississippi by a landslide margin of 87.87%.

== Results ==
General election results
| Party | Pledged to | Elector | Votes |
|---|---|---|---|
| Democratic Party | Woodrow Wilson | W. A. Henry | 80,422 |
| Democratic Party | Woodrow Wilson | E. C. Sharp | 80,363 |
| Democratic Party | Woodrow Wilson | J. L. Byrd | 80,354 |
| Democratic Party | Woodrow Wilson | James McClure | 80,294 |
| Democratic Party | Woodrow Wilson | S. Joe Owen | 80,226 |
| Democratic Party | Woodrow Wilson | James R. McDowell | 80,194 |
| Democratic Party | Woodrow Wilson | Hugh M. Badley | 80,172 |
| Democratic Party | Woodrow Wilson | J. D. Donald | 80,168 |
| Democratic Party | Woodrow Wilson | J. D. Jones | 80,112 |
| Democratic Party | Woodrow Wilson | Rogert Montgomery | 80,058 |
| Republican Party | Charles Evans Hughes | S. S. Matthews | 4,253 |
| Republican Party | Charles Evans Hughes | J. A. Toler | 4,224 |
| Republican Party | Charles Evans Hughes | Percy A. Matthews | 4,199 |
| Republican Party | Charles Evans Hughes | L. R. Collins | 4,197 |
| Republican Party | Charles Evans Hughes | H. E. Fitts | 4,196 |
| Republican Party | Charles Evans Hughes | C. H. Thomas | 4,187 |
| Republican Party | Charles Evans Hughes | Lamar Callicott | 4,158 |
| Republican Party | Charles Evans Hughes | J. Jay White | 4,151 |
| Republican Party | Charles Evans Hughes | S. T. Walls | 4,146 |
| Socialist Party of America | Allan Louis Benson | G. W. Powell | 1,484 |
| Socialist Party of America | Allan Louis Benson | E. F. Millar | 1,482 |
| Socialist Party of America | Allan Louis Benson | D. R. Hearne | 1,469 |
| Socialist Party of America | Allan Louis Benson | R. B. Edwards | 1,456 |
| Socialist Party of America | Allan Louis Benson | W. C. Kennedy | 1,452 |
| Socialist Party of America | Allan Louis Benson | A. H. Lampe | 1,440 |
| Socialist Party of America | Allan Louis Benson | J. B. Praytor | 1,428 |
| Socialist Party of America | Allan Louis Benson | E. E. Champion | 1,426 |
| Socialist Party of America | Allan Louis Benson | J. C. Shankle | 1,424 |
| Socialist Party of America | Allan Louis Benson | V. L. Egger | 1,419 |
| Progressive Party | Unpledged | J. H. Cook | 520 |
| Progressive Party | Unpledged | T. W. Collins | 502 |
| Progressive Party | Unpledged | B. F. Fridge | 498 |
| Progressive Party | Unpledged | J. M. Moore | 485 |
| Progressive Party | Unpledged | M. S. McLean | 480 |
| Progressive Party | Unpledged | S. S. Coleman | 479 |
| Progressive Party | Unpledged | P. C. Lewis | 478 |
| Progressive Party | Unpledged | J. M. Wingo | 474 |
| Progressive Party | Unpledged | A. V. Hiler | 451 |
| Progressive Party | Unpledged | G. H. Sager | 437 |
| Total votes | | | 86,679 |

== See also ==
- United States presidential elections in Mississippi
