= Flying Squadron of America =

Temperance organization in the US

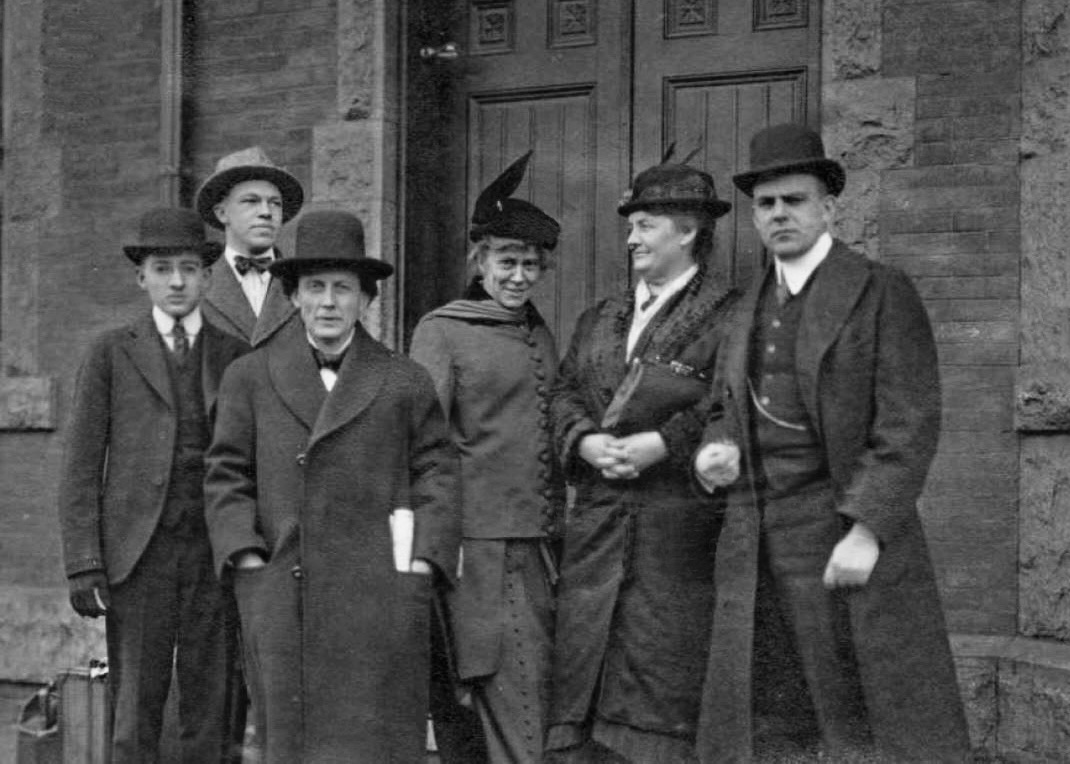
Flying Squadron Lecturers in Indiana, 1914

The Flying Squadron of America (sometimes called Hanly's Flying Squadron) was a temperance organization that staged a nationwide campaign to promote the temperance movement in the United States. It was informally organized by J. Frank Hanly after the National Temperance Council, and its goal was prohibition, specifically "A Saloonless Nation by 1920" as its member Ira Landrith stated The Squadron was a non-political and inter-denominational organization. In its members' own words, their "immediate and sole object is the inauguration and execution of a great forward movement for the national destruction of the liquor traffic."

== Locations Visited ==
The Flying Squadron of America consisted of three groups of revivalist-like speakers who toured cities across the country, starting in Peoria, Illinois on September 30, 1914. The three groups covered three cities each day, and in the South visited South Carolina, Florida, Alabama, Georgia, Tennessee, Arkansas, Mississippi, Louisiana. Further West they visited Texas, Colorado, New Mexico, Utah, Idaho, and Wyoming before heading East. The final leg of their journey began in Cheyenne, Wyoming on April 13, when they followed each other through Nebraska, Missouri, Kansas, Iowa, Illinois, Indiana, Ohio, Kentucky, West Virginia, Pennsylvania, Maryland and New York. Their final convention occurred in Atlantic City, New Jersey on June 6, 1915, marking the end of the tour.

== Organization ==
The first traveling group of the Squadron was led by Daniel A. Poling and Dr. Charles M. Sheldon, the second by Ira Landrith and Dr. Carolyn E. Geisel, and the third by Oliver W. Stewart and J. Frank Hanly, who was the creator of the Squadron.

These groups traveled 42,000 miles, and had already covered 88 cities and made between 3,000 and 4,000 speeches by Cincinnati, Ohio on December 20. Across all three groups, the Squadron spent 2 to 3 days in each city, giving between 12 and 25 addresses in many cities. Each Flying Squadron session was open to the public without an admission fee. The meetings were often held at churches, and were opened and interspersed with music provided by members traveling with the Squadron. Some of these musicians included Dr. D. V. Poling, William Lowell Patton, Mr. and Mrs. Frederick Butler, Miss Vera K. Mullin, Miss Iris Robinson, and Miss Hallie McNeill.

The Squadron was financially supported in part by their treasurer John B. Lewis. Ten years into retirement, Lewis was known for devoting his time to philanthropy and the temperance movement, and contributed $10,000 to the Squadron's cause.

== Speeches ==
These speakers used "scientific inquiries" to convince their audiences that alcohol was dangerous, and Dr. Geisel at one point was quoted stating that "In beer drinking Munich seventy-two out of every 100 children born are physically deficient, while in prohibition Maine seventy-one and one-half out of every 100 are physically perfect." In one speech Dr. Geisel also specifically addressed the women of America by asking them to remember that "God made [women] to be mothers of men and something has gone wrong with this important business of man raising ... the business is ruined by the existence of the saloon." Other speakers used the fear of alcoholism to sway their crowd as well, with member Ira Landrith stating the following in North Carolina; "if the saloon is permitted to do its work with and for [an individual], he will be fit neither to live nor to live with."

== See also ==
- Temperance organizations
- Frank Hanly

== Sources ==
- Indiana State Library
