= Joseph B. Cheadle =

American politician

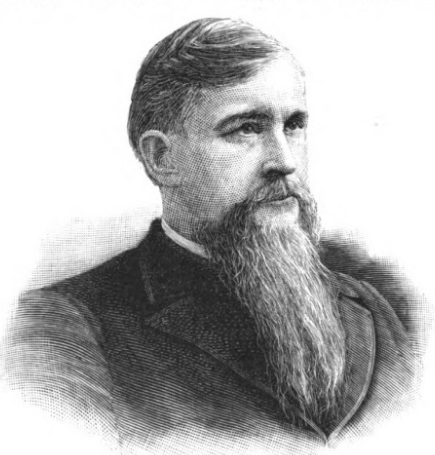

Member of the U.S. House of Representatives from Indiana's 9th district
- In office March 4, 1887 – March 3, 1891
- Preceded by: Thomas B. Ward
- Succeeded by: Daniel W. Waugh

Personal details
- Born: August 14, 1842 Perrysville, Indiana, U.S.
- Died: May 28, 1904 (aged 61) Frankfort, Indiana, U.S
- Party: Republican
- Other political affiliations: Democratic (before 1897)

Military service
- Branch/service: Union Army
- Rank: Private
- Unit: 71st Regiment; Indiana Volunteer Infantry; Company K
- Battles/wars: American Civil War

Joseph Bonaparte Cheadle (August 14, 1842 – May 28, 1904) was an American lawyer and Civil War veteran who served two terms as a U.S. representative from Indiana from 1887 to 1891.

== Early life and career ==
Born in Perrysville, Indiana, Cheadle attended the common schools. He entered Asbury (now De Pauw) University, Greencastle, Indiana, but upon the organization of the Seventy-first Regiment, Indiana Volunteer Infantry, enlisted as a private in Company K and served until the close of the Civil War.

He returned home and entered upon the study of law. He was graduated from the Indianapolis Law College in 1867. He was admitted to the bar and commenced practice in Newport, Indiana. He continued in practice until 1873, when he entered upon newspaper work.

== Congress ==
Cheadle was elected as a Republican to the Fiftieth and Fifty-first Congresses (March 4, 1887 – March 3, 1891). He was an unsuccessful candidate for renomination in 1890, and for nomination to the Fifty-third and Fifty-fourth Congresses in 1892 and 1894.

== Later career and death ==
He was affiliated with the Democratic Party in 1896. He was an unsuccessful candidate for election in 1896 and 1898 on the Democratic and Populist tickets. He was editor of the American Standard in 1896. He died in Frankfort, Indiana, May 28, 1904. He was interred in Greenlawn Cemetery.

U.S. House of Representatives
Preceded by Thomas B. Ward	Member of the U.S. House of Representatives from Indiana's 9th congressional district 1887-1891	Succeeded by Daniel W. Waugh
