= 1916 Prohibition National Convention =

American political convention

- 1916 presidential election

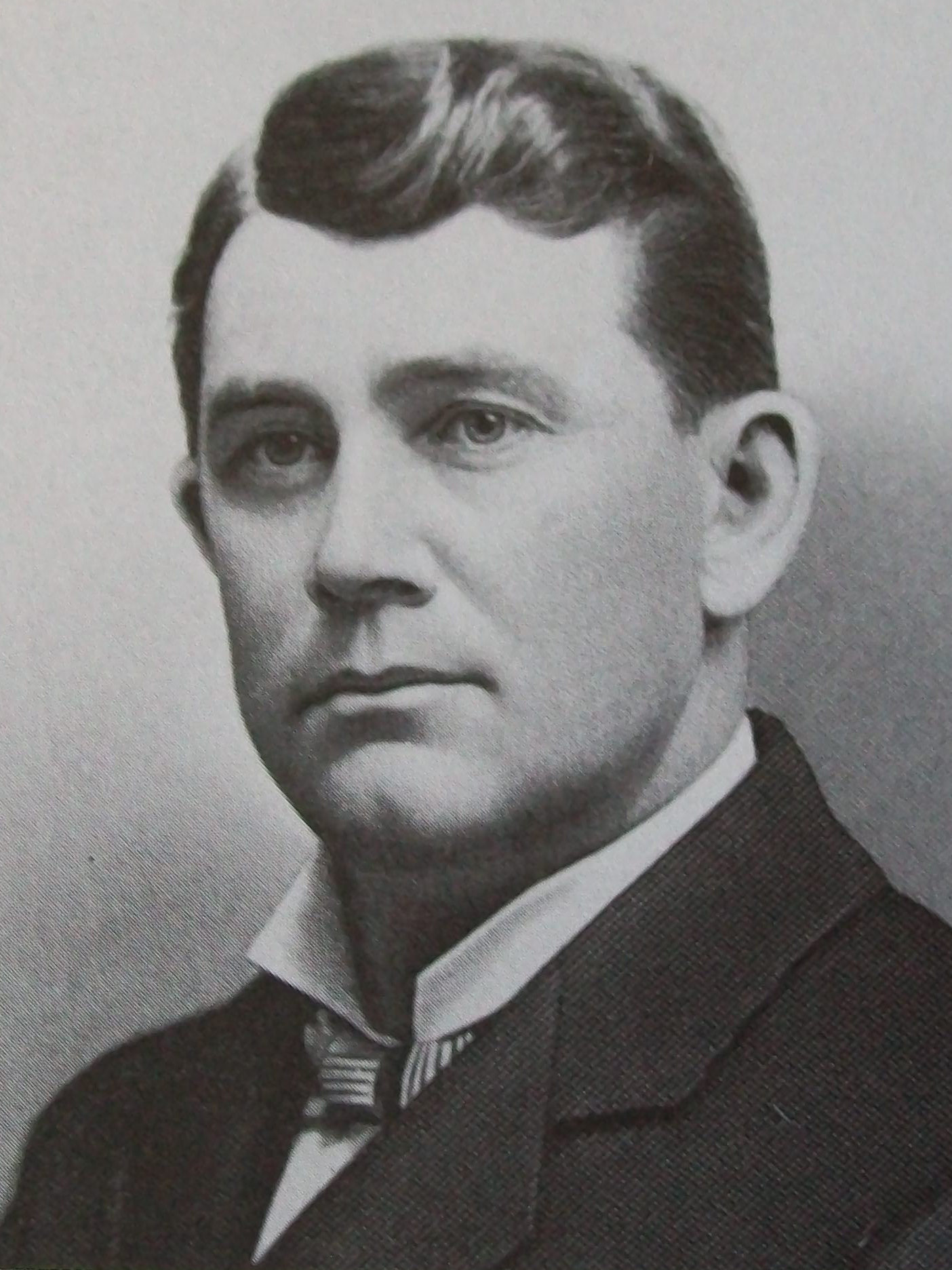
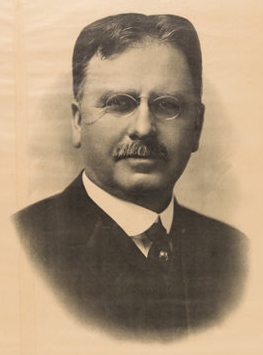
- Nominees (Hanly & Landrith)

Convention
- Dates: July 18–20, 1916
- City: Saint Paul, Minnesota
- Venue: Municipal Auditorium

Candidates
- Presidential nominee: Frank Hanly of Indiana
- Vice-presidential nominee: Ira Landrith of Kentucky

The 1916 Prohibition National Convention was held in Saint Paul, Minnesota, July 18–20, 1916. The convention nominated Frank Hanly (former governor of Indiana) and Ira Landrith (Presbyterian minister and activist).

== Background ==
The Prohibition Party is a third party in the United States, founded in 1869. Its primary issue since it founding has long been its support for the temperance movement, advocating for the prohibition of alcohol in the United States. The 1916 convention was particularly important for the party, as it came at a time when the party and its allies were gathering political support to amend the Constitution of the United States to impose national alcohol prohibition. In the years that followed the 1916 convention, the 18th Amendment was ratified (being in effect from 1920 until 1933).

In December 1915, two-time Prohibition nominee Eugene W. Chafin declared that he would not seek the Prohibition presidential nomination again for the 1916 presidential election and that he believed that Representative Richmond P. Hobson would receive the nomination. He also endorsed Henry Ford's Peace Ship, and announced he would put forward a vote at the convention to add planks to its platform calling for the abolition of the War and Navy Departments and establishment of a Department of Peace.

While party had succeeded in passing several state-level prohibition laws by 1916, it had not seen much electoral success for its political nominees. The party's aspirations for the 1916 presidential election were to secure one million votes in the general election, which would have been more than the party had ever received. The party hoped that the party could out-perform the Socialist Party of America, another sizable third-party. This did not occur, with the party's presidential ticket ultimately securing approximately 200,000 votes, far behind the Socialist Party, and a showing that delivered some embarrassment to the Prohibition Party. The party did manage to elect its nominee (Sidney Johnston Catts) in the coinciding Florida gubernatorial election.

== Logistics ==
The convention was held in Saint Paul, Minnesota July 18–20, 1916 at the Municipal Auditorium. Saloons in Saint Paul received low business while the convention was held in the city.

Daniel A. Poling served as the temporary chairman during the convention.

== Presidential nomination ==
The party nominated Frank Hanly of Indiana for president. Hanly was formerly the governor of Indiana, an office to which he had been elected as a Republican.

Hanly received 440 on the presidential balloting. His closest competitor, William Sulzer (a former governor of New York) received 181. After it became clear Hanly had secured enough support on the first round of balloting, several delegates shifted their votes over to Hanly to further increase his official tally.

Chafin had attempted to draft Henry Ford for the presidential nomination, but Ford did not seek the nomination. At the national convention Chafin put supported Sulzer for the presidential nomination. An attempt was made to make Hanly's nomination unanimous, but it failed after Chafin objected.

== Vice presidential nomination ==
A woman was among those considered in the balloting for vice president. This is considered the earliest instance in which a woman was considered in balloting for either president of vice president by a sizable third-party. The party nominated Ira Landrith of Kentucky for vice president. His nomination was made unanimous after other vice presidential contenders withdrew.

== Party platform and other business ==
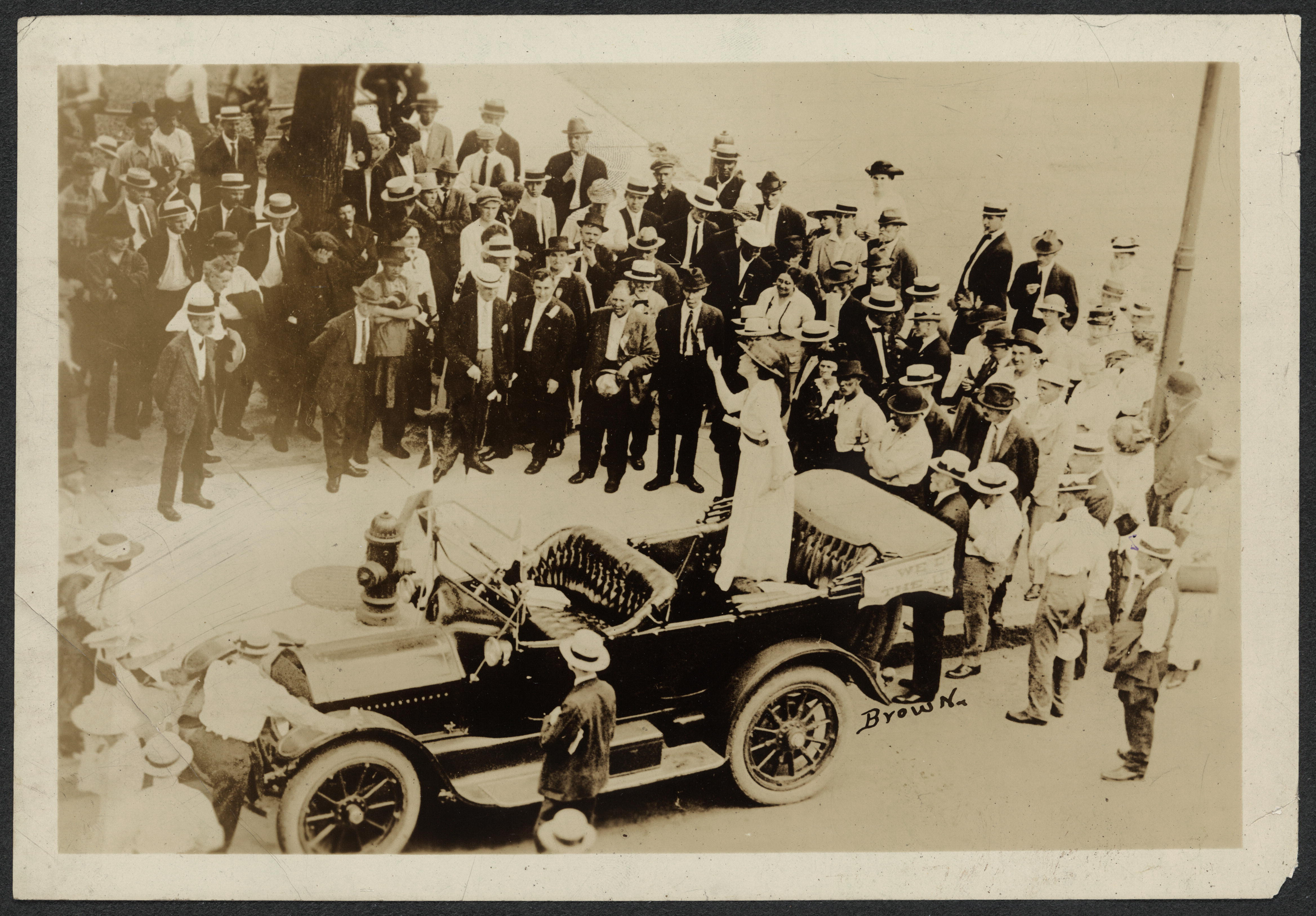
Elsie Hill speaking to a meeting on the streets of Saint Paul during the convention, urging convention delegates to adopt a platform plank supporting women's suffrage

The convention adopted a plank in its platform advocating for women's suffrage. Activists had come to the convention to urge the plank's adoption, including Elsie Hill who spoke at a street meeting in Saint Paul during the convention (as a representative of the Congressional Union for Woman Suffrage).

Chafin objected and stopped efforts at the convention to rename the party to either the Progressive, American, or National party.
