= Daniel W. Waugh =

American politician (1842–1921)

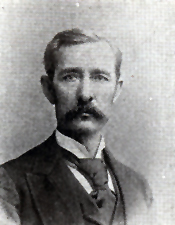

Member of the U.S. House of Representatives from Indiana's 9th district
- In office March 4, 1891 – March 3, 1895
- Preceded by: Joseph B. Cheadle
- Succeeded by: Frank Hanly

Personal details
- Born: Daniel Webster Waugh; March 7, 1842 Bluffton, Indiana, United States
- Died: March 14, 1921 (aged 79) Tipton, Indiana, United States
- Resting place: Green Lawn Cemetery
- Spouse: Alice Elizabeth Grove

Daniel Webster Waugh (March 7, 1842 – March 14, 1921) was an American lawyer and Civil War veteran who served two terms as a U.S. representative from Indiana from 1891 to 1895.

== Early life and career ==
Waugh was born Daniel Webster Waugh near Bluffton, Indiana, to Archibald Burnett Waugh (1812–1881) and Nancy Sutton (1818–1864), one of four boys and attended local schools.

=== Civil War ===
He entered into the military in 1861 by enlisting in the Union Army. Waugh served in Company A, 34th Indiana Infantry Regiment and he was honorably discharged in September 1864.

=== Family ===
He married Alice Elizabeth Grove on March 7, 1870. She was born December 1852 in Ohio. She died January 13, 1928, in Tipton, Indiana, and was buried there. They had four children, three daughters who lived to maturity.

== Law ==
Waugh was both a teacher and a farmer before being admitted to the bar in 1866. He moved to Tipton, Indiana, in 1867, where he practiced law. He also served as a judge of the thirty-sixth judicial circuit from 1884 to 1890.

== Political career ==
He was elected as a Republican to the Fifty-second and Fifty-third Congresses (March 4, 1891 – March 3, 1895). He declined candidacy for his renomination in 1894.

== Final years ==
He practiced law until his retirement. He died in Tipton on March 14, 1921. He is interred in the mausoleum adjoining Green Lawn Cemetery.

U.S. House of Representatives
Preceded by Joseph B. Cheadle	Member of the U.S. House of Representatives from Indiana's 9th congressional district 1891–1895	Succeeded by Frank Hanly
