= National Temperance Council =

Temperance organization in the United States

The National Temperance Council was established in 1913 to coordinate the activities of numerous organizations in the temperance movement. Its purpose included the promotion of alcohol education. Its goal was the ratification of an amendment to the United States Constitution outlawing the manufacture, distribution and sale of alcoholic beverages throughout the country.

The National Temperance Council stated that it represented 14-15 million American citizens and had a membership of "22 organizations, church boards, and commissions", with representatives from major Christian denominations. Notable temperance organisations in the United States that held membership in the National Temperance and Prohibition Council included the Woman's Christian Temperance Union, Preferred Risk Mutual Insurance Company, International Organisation of Good Templars, American Temperance Society, and Prohibition Party.

== See also ==
- List of Temperance organizations
