= Ira Landrith =

American Presbyterian minister and temperance activist

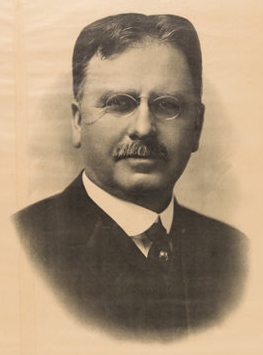

Personal details
- Born: March 23, 1865 Milford, Texas, U.S.
- Died: October 11, 1941 (aged 76) Altadena, California, U.S.
- Party: Prohibition
- Spouse(s): Corinne Burney (m. 1889; died 1889) Harriett Canfield Grannis (m. 1891; died 1925) Sallie A. Alexander (m. 1936)
- Parents: Martin Luther Landrith (father); Mary Matilda Groves (mother)
- Education: Trinity University, Texas (BS); Cumberland University (LLB)

Ira Landrith (March 23, 1865 – October 11, 1941) was an American Presbyterian minister and temperance activist. A known orator, Landrith was part of the Flying Squadron of America, which traveled the United States advocating for temperance.

== Life ==
Landrith was educated at Trinity University and Cumberland University. From 1893 to 1894 he served as the general secretary of the Religious Education Association and as general secretary of the Presbyterian Brotherhood of America from 1907 to 1909. He served as president of Belmont College (now University) from 1904 to 1912, of Ward Seminary from 1912 to 1913, and of Ward-Belmont College from 1913 to 1915.

In 1914, he became a member of the Flying Squadron of America and from 1915 to 1925 served as a lecturer for the Anti-Saloon League and World League Against Alcoholism. On July 21, 1916 (at the Prohibition National Convention), he was given the Prohibition Party's vice presidential nomination with the support of National Treasurer Herman P. Faris for the 1916 presidential election and in the general election he and Frank Hanly received 221,302 votes.

From 1920 to 1927 he served as president of the Intercollegiate Prohibition Association of Washington, D.C., and later as president of the National Temperance Council from 1928 to 1931. On October 11, 1941, he died in Altadena, California.

Party political offices
Preceded by Aaron S. Watkins	Prohibition nominee for Vice President of the United States; 1916	Succeeded by D. Leigh Colvin
