= Frank Hanly =

American politician (1863–1920)

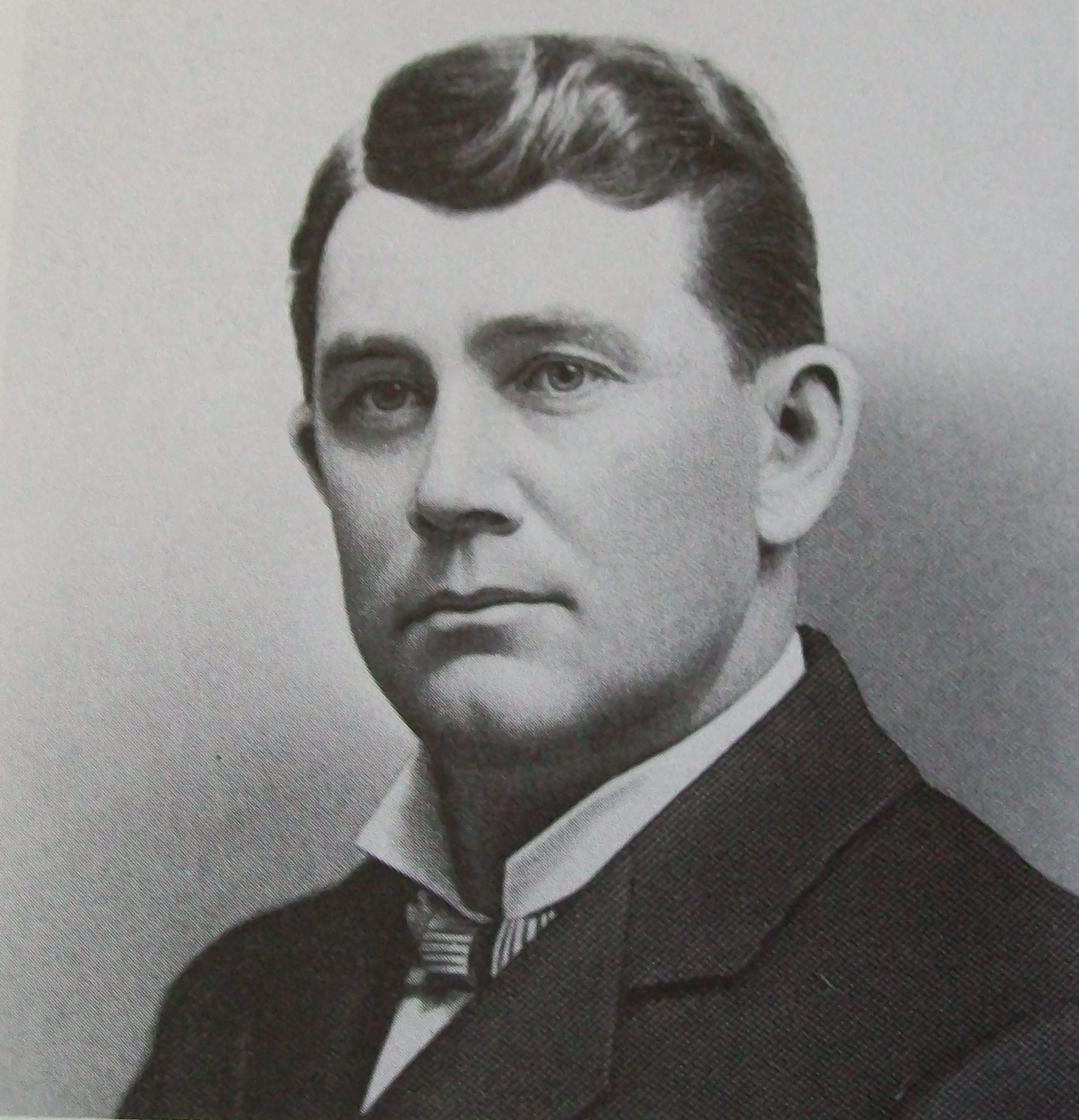
- Hanly, c. 1908

26th Governor of Indiana
- In office January 9, 1905 – January 11, 1909
- Lieutenant: Hugh Thomas Miller
- Preceded by: Winfield T. Durbin
- Succeeded by: Thomas Marshall

Member of the U.S. House of Representatives from Indiana's 9th district
- In office March 4, 1895 – March 3, 1897
- Preceded by: Daniel W. Waugh
- Succeeded by: Charles B. Landis

Member of the Indiana Senate
- In office 1890-1891

Personal details
- Born: James Franklin Hanly; April 4, 1863 St. Joseph, Illinois, U.S.
- Died: August 1, 1920 (aged 57) Dennison, Ohio, U.S.
- Resting place: Hillside Cemetery
- Party: Republican (before 1909); Prohibition (1909–1920)
- Spouse: Eva Simmer
- Education: Eastern Illinois University
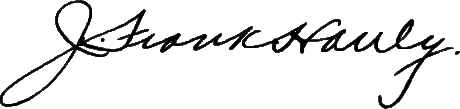
- Signature

James Franklin Hanly (April 4, 1863 – August 1, 1920) was an American politician who served as a congressman from Indiana from 1895 until 1897, and was the 26th governor of Indiana from 1905 to 1909. He was the founder of Hanly's Flying Squadron, which advocated prohibition nationally and played an important role in arousing public support for prohibition.

During his term as governor he successfully advocated the passage of a local-option liquor law, which led the majority of Indiana's counties to ban liquor sales. His other achievements included banning gambling, fighting political corruption, and adjusting state agencies to operate on a non-partisan basis. He left office and the Republican Party and became an active and vocal prohibitionist. He was an unsuccessful Prohibition Party candidate for President of the United States in the 1916 election.

== Early life ==
Hanly was born in a log cabin near St. Joseph, Illinois on April 4, 1863, the youngest of the seven children of Elijah and Anna Calton Hanly. His mother taught him to read at home, even though she was blind. As a young man he lived for a while on a farm in the nearby village of Homer. In Homer he attended the Liberty rural school for one year where he became known as a formidable debater. At age sixteen he left home to attend the common schools and the Eastern Illinois Normal School at Charleston, Illinois, until 1879. He worked odd jobs to pay for his schooling, and often slept in barns. That year he graduated he moved to Warren County, Indiana where he taught in the state public schools from 1881 to 1889.

He met Eva Augusta Rachel Simmer and the couple married in 1881. Together, they had five children, but only one survived childhood. While teaching he became friends with a local judge, Joseph M. Rabb. Rabb encouraged Hanly to take an active part in politics and stump in behalf of Republicans. Hanly studied law and was admitted to the bar in 1889, joining Rabb's law office in Williamsport, Indiana. Hanly practiced law with Ele Stansbury, a young lawyer who would later serve as Indiana Attorney General.

== Political career ==
=== Early campaigns ===
He was elected as a member of the Indiana State Senate in an 1889 special election to fill and empty state senate seat, defeating George W. Cronk, and served there from 1890 until 1891. In the senate he gained a reputation for vigorous oration.

=== Congress ===
He ran as a Republican and won election to the Fifty-fourth Congress, serving from March 4, 1895, to March 3, 1897. During his term his district was realigned by the Democratic controlled Indiana General Assembly, who created a gerrymander of his district causing him to lose his re-election in 1896.

=== U.S. Senate campaign ===
He launched a campaign for Republican nomination for U.S. Senate in 1899, but was defeated in the Republican legislature vote by Albert J. Beveridge. The election caused a major division in the state party, and progressive anti-prohibition candidates supported Beveridge, while the prohibition and conservative wing of the party supported Hanly. After losing the nomination, he briefly retired from politics. The split worsened following the election, leading progressives to split from the Republican party. Hanly went on a speaking tour around the state to build up support for another run for office. His speeches were fiery and often quoted Abraham Lincoln.

=== Governor ===
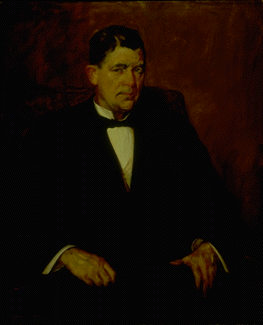
Frank Hanly's official governor's portrait

Hanly reentered politics in 1904, and won the Republican nomination for governor of Indiana. Hanly was elected Governor of Indiana, defeating John W. Kern by 84,364 votes. The election was hard-fought by Hanly, who delivered excoriating speeches against the Democratic party which he referred to as "unholy", and "great only its ability to destroy." He called their election campaign "selfish" and said they ran it only so they could "obtain the flesh pot of office." Hanly was considered a party maverick and he pushed his own agenda, rather than his party's platform, once in office. He pushed for what he considered major state reforms, accomplishing many of them. He crusaded against liquor, horse-racing and political corruption, even prosecuting members of his own administration for embezzlement.

Using his popularity, he was able to have the Republican-controlled General Assembly pass legislation to ban gambling on horse races in the state and at the Indiana State Fair. He successfully reorganized most of the state government in an attempt to make the government bureaus non-partisan. He was able to successfully achieve his goal among the state's law enforcement, correctional facilities, and state-run charities. He also brought considerable improvement to the state's accounting methods. He required detailed expense reports to be created by all state employees seeking reimbursements, began regular audits of all spending, and with the support of the state treasurer, he began to establish new accounts by which the government could better monitor where funds were being spent, and by whom.

In 1907, he signed the Compulsory Sterilization Law, which mandated the sterilization of certain individuals in state custody, making Indiana the first state to adopt eugenics legislation. The legislation was part of the progressive agenda and received broad support at the time. Governor Thomas R. Marshall later ordered the practice stopped in 1909. In 1921, the Indiana Supreme Court found the law unconstitutional.

A major scandal broke shortly after he entered office, when it was found the public officials had been using their expense accounts to pay for gambling debts at the French Lick Springs Hotel, owned by the chairman of the Democratic National Committee, Thomas Taggart. Hanly harangued Taggart for breaking the law by establishing a "Monte Carlo." In July 1906 he ordered the state police to raid French Lick and West Baden, and seized several slot machines, roulette wheels, poker sets, playing cards, Klondike tables, gambling records, dice, and a whole host of other gambling implements. He brought suit against the corporations operating the French Lick Springs Hotel and the West Baden Springs Hotel seeking to seize their properties for profiting from illegal activities. John Kerns, who Hanly defeated for governor in 1904, represented the hotels. The case dragged on until after Hanly left office. In 1910 an Orange County jury ruled in favor of the hotels.

Hanly was most concerned about temperance and was known to support a ban on liquor. His stated reason for supporting prohibition was the effect that alcoholics had on their children. He championed a bill that would allow counties to ban the sale of alcohol. The General Assembly had failed to pass the bill during their two normal sessions during his terms, so he called a special session in 1908 to have the body take up debate of the propose bill, which they passed. Once enacted, 72 of Indiana's 92 counties went dry, banning the sale of all liquors. The timing of the passage of the bill caused it to become a major election issue, and Hanly had robbed the Republicans of one of the primary plank of their platform and alienated progressives, costing Republicans the election.

=== Prohibition party ===
While still governor, Hanly began to make work with the Anti-Saloon League. Early on he discovered the divisions within the prohibitionist movement and was instrumental in unifying the groups and their goal. He was among the first to advocate a constitutional amendment to ban the sale of liquor, and the prohibitionists rallied to that goal.

Hanly was a prohibition lecturer throughout the United States from 1910 to 1920 and in France in 1919. He organized the Flying Squadron of America (sometimes called Hanly's Flying Squadron), a temperance organization that staged a nationwide campaign to promote temperance. It consisted of three groups of revivalist-like speakers who toured cities across the country between September 30, 1914, and June 6, 1915.

Hanly left the Republican party to join the new Prohibition Party following his term as governor. In 1915 he was nominated to be the party's candidate for governor, but he declined, and instead became the Progressive Party's candidate. He was later nominated at the 1916 Prohibition National Convention to be the Prohibition Party's nominee for president of the United States in the 1916 election. Hanly was overwhelmingly defeated; the ticket of Hanly and Ira Landrith garnered 221,030 votes, or about 1.2% of the total.

In April 1920 Hanly argued the case of Hawke v. Smith, a challenge to the Eighteenth Amendment, before the United States Supreme Court. The case was based on the belief that the amendment had been invalidated when Ohio overturned their previous ratification of the amendment after a public referendum. Hanly won a unanimous decision issued on June 1, 1920, upholding prohibition and determining that Ohio could not change their vote after the tally had already been taken among the states.

== Death ==
While on a trip to Ohio in 1920 to give anti-liquor lectures, he was involved in an automobile-train accident near Dennison, Ohio and died from his injuries. He is interred at Hillside Cemetery, near Williamsport, Indiana.

== Electoral history ==
Indiana gubernatorial election, 1904
Party	Candidate	Votes	%
Republican	Frank Hanly	359,362	53.5
Democratic	John Kern	274,998	41.0
Prohibition	McWhirter	22,690	3.4
Socialist	Hallenberger	10,991	1.6
Populist	Leroy Templeton	2,605	0.4

Indiana gubernatorial election, 1916
Party	Candidate	Votes	%
Republican	James P. Goodrich	337,831	47.8
Democratic	John A. M. Adair	325,060	46.0
Prohibition	William Hickman	16,401	2.3
Progressive	Frank Hanly	7,067	1.0

Electoral results
Presidential candidate	Party	Home state	Popular vote		Electoral vote	Running mate		
Presidential candidate	Party	Home state	Count	Percentage	Electoral vote	Vice-presidential candidate	Home state	Electoral vote
Woodrow Wilson	Democratic	New Jersey	9,126,868	49.2%	277	Thomas Riley Marshall	Indiana	277
Charles Evans Hughes	Republican	New York	8,548,728	46.1%	254	Charles Warren Fairbanks	Indiana	254
Allan Louis Benson	Socialist	New York	590,524	3.2%	0	George Ross Kirkpatrick	New Jersey	0
James Franklin Hanly	Prohibition	Indiana	221,302	1.2%	0	Ira Landrith	Tennessee	0
Other			49,163	0.3%	—	Other		—
Total			18,536,585	100%	531			531
Needed to win					266			266

Source (Popular Vote): Leip, David. "1916 Presidential Election Results". Dave Leip's Atlas of U.S. Presidential Elections.Source (Electoral Vote): "Electoral College Box Scores 1789–1996". National Archives and Records Administration.

== See also ==
Author of A Day in the Siskiyous An Oregon Extravaganza (https://www.loc.gov/resource/gdcmassbookdig.dayinsiskiyous00hanl/?st=gallery)

- List of governors of Indiana
- Flying Squadron Also known as "Hanly's Flying Squadron."
- Temperance movement
- Temperance organizations

U.S. House of Representatives
Preceded by Daniel W. Waugh	Member of the U.S. House of Representatives from Indiana's 9th congressional district 1895–1897	Succeeded by Charles B. Landis
Party political offices
Preceded by Winfield T. Durbin	Republican nominee for Governor of Indiana; 1904	Succeeded by James E. Watson
Preceded by Eugene W. Chafin	Prohibition nominee for President of the United States; 1916	Succeeded by Aaron S. Watkins
Political offices
Preceded by Winfield T. Durbin	Governor of Indiana; 1905–1909	Succeeded by Thomas Marshall
