= Allan L. Benson =

American journalist and politician

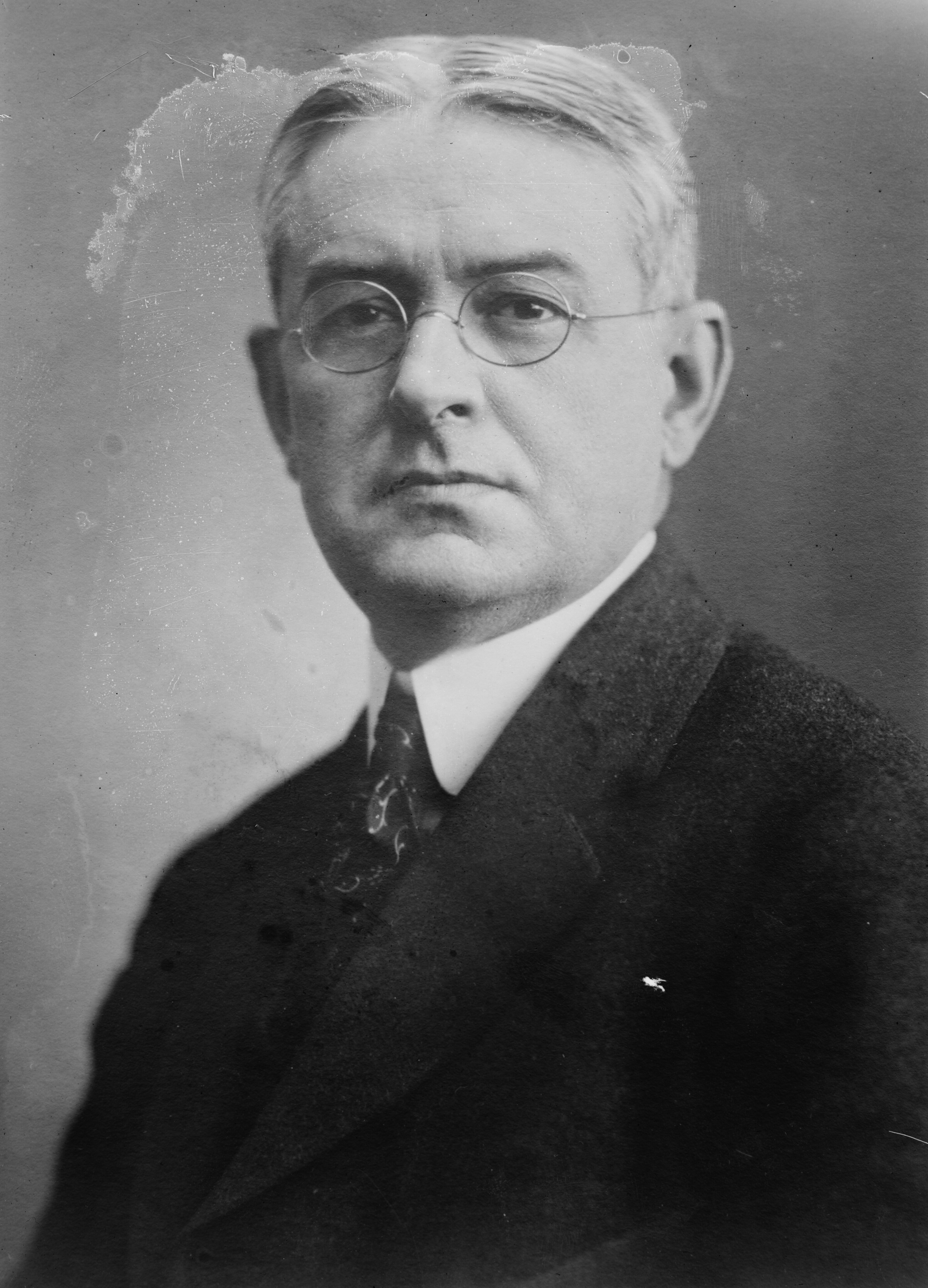
- Benson c. 1916
- Born: Allan Louis Benson; November 6, 1871; Plainwell, Michigan, U.S.
- Died: August 19, 1940 (aged 68); Yonkers, New York, U.S.
- Political party: Socialist (before 1918); Social Democratic League (1918–1940)
- Spouse: Mary Hugh
- Children: 4

Allan Louis Benson (November 6, 1871 – August 19, 1940) was an American newspaper editor and author who was the Socialist Party of America nominee for President of the United States in 1916. Known for his outspoken anti-war views, Benson and his running mate George Ross Kirkpatrick received 590,524 votes, 3.2% of the total vote in the election.

== Early life and education ==
Benson was born in Plainwell, Michigan, on November 6, 1871. His father, Adelbert L. Benson, was a factory worker during Allan's boyhood, later becoming a miller, while his mother, Rose Morris Benson, died when Allan was an infant. Allan lived with his grandfather until the age of 12. His grandfather was a farmer in Silver Creek, Michigan.

At the age of 15, Benson's father's mill burned and he was forced to give up his aspiration of attending college and becoming a lawyer. Benson left home and took a job in a chair factory, later working in a paper mill.

Benson only attended one year of high school, but he nevertheless took the state examination to become a school teacher and passed, earning a certificate to teach in a district school. He became involved in a physical conflict with some farm boys in the first school to which he was assigned and was apparently forced to resign his post.

== Career ==
In April 1891, Benson left Otsego, Michigan, for Detroit, where he went to work for the Peninsular Car Company as a machine hand. He began to regularly visit the offices of the various Detroit newspapers in search of a position and was finally hired as a reporter, earning the starvation wage of $6 a week.

Benson moved to Ann Arbor in the fall of 1891 to assume the position of managing editor of the Washetaw Daily Times. He continued to move up the ranks of the newspaper profession, moving to a position as telegraph editor of the Chicago Inter-Ocean in the spring of 1892. He later worked as telegraph editor of the Salt Lake Tribune and as a writer in San Francisco.

Benson subsequently worked as managing editor of the Detroit Journal, the Detroit Times, and the Washington Times. He married Mary Hugh in Windsor, Ontario, on November 19, 1899, and had four children.

=== Socialist writer ===
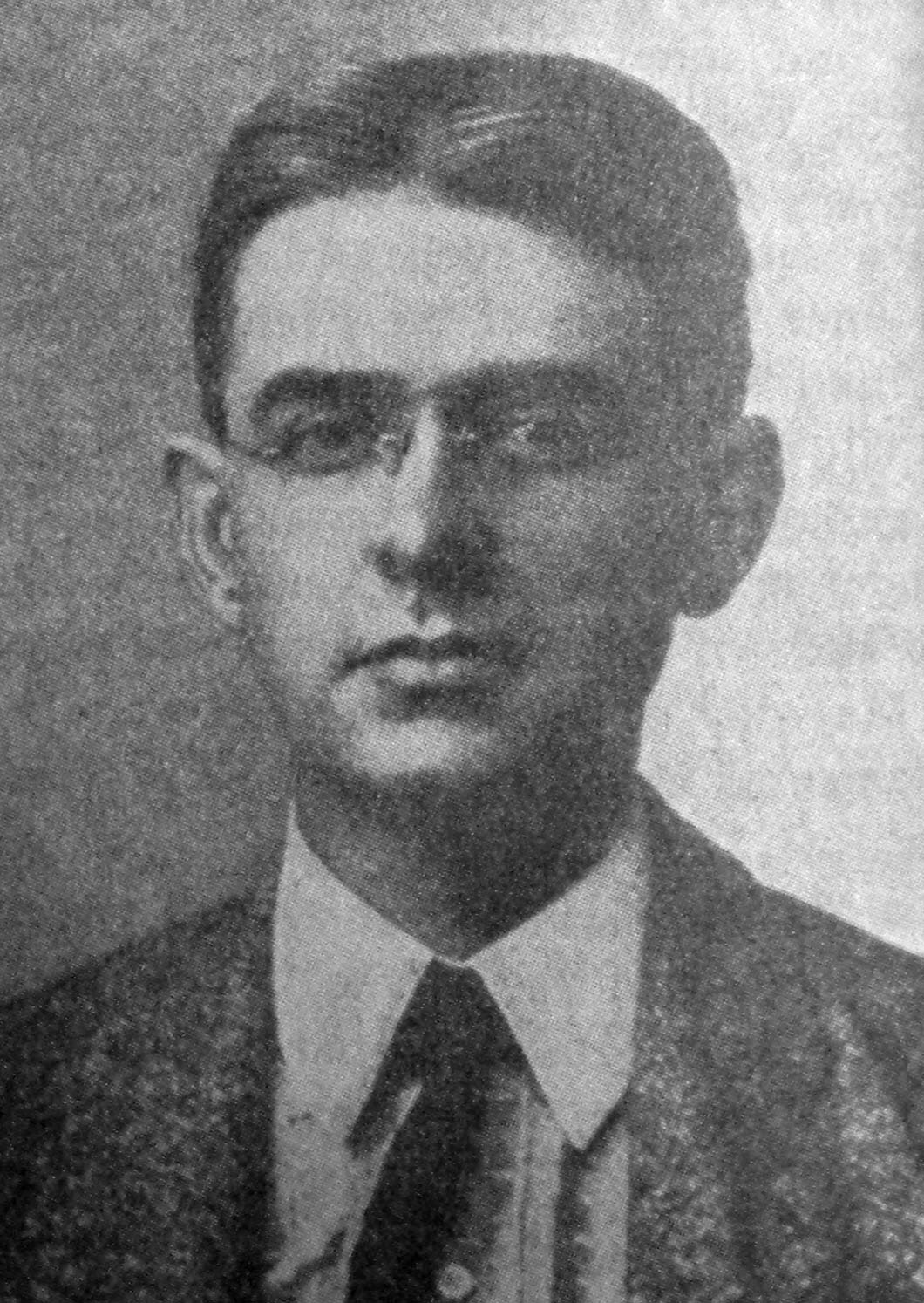
Benson c. 1905

During his tenure as a newspaper editor, Benson read an encyclopedia article on the topic of socialism written by an English Fabian and was thereby won over to the socialist movement. He joined the staff of the Appeal to Reason, a mass circulation socialist weekly published in Girard, Kansas, and his editorials for that publication made him into a nationally recognized figure among radical American political activists.

Benson was particularly outspoken in his opposition to militarism, championing a proposal to ban American entry from World War I unless participation was first approved by a national referendum of the American people. Benson further demanded that anyone voting in favor of participation should be the first enlisted in the army, implemented through a signed rather than secret ballot. This demand was criticized by many of the Socialist Party's faithful as impractical, including leading party voice Morris Hillquit, who dismissed Benson's demand as "positively wild".

Benson's position on American entry into World War I found a receptive audience among the Socialist Party's rank and file. As the Socialist Party Presidential and Vice-Presidential nominations for 1916 were made by a referendum vote of a membership rather than via a political convention, Benson's status as a widely published anti-war writer made him a frontrunner for the party's nomination. With Eugene V. Debs opting out of the 1916 presidential race so that he could attempt to win election to the US House of Representatives from his home state of Indiana, Benson was left free to run against labor leader James H. Maurer of Pennsylvania and Arthur LeSueur of North Dakota. Benson captured a majority of referendum votes cast by party members to become the Socialist Party's Presidential nominee.

The 1916 campaign was run by Benson and the Socialist Party primarily through the newspapers, with Benson concentrating his fire on the country's "Preparedness" campaign. The campaign proved manifestly unsuccessful, with Benson capturing only half of the nearly 1 million votes cast for Gene Debs in the 1912 campaign. Benson and his running mate George Ross Kirkpatrick ultimately received 590,524 votes, or 3.2% of the total vote.

=== Split with the Socialist Party ===
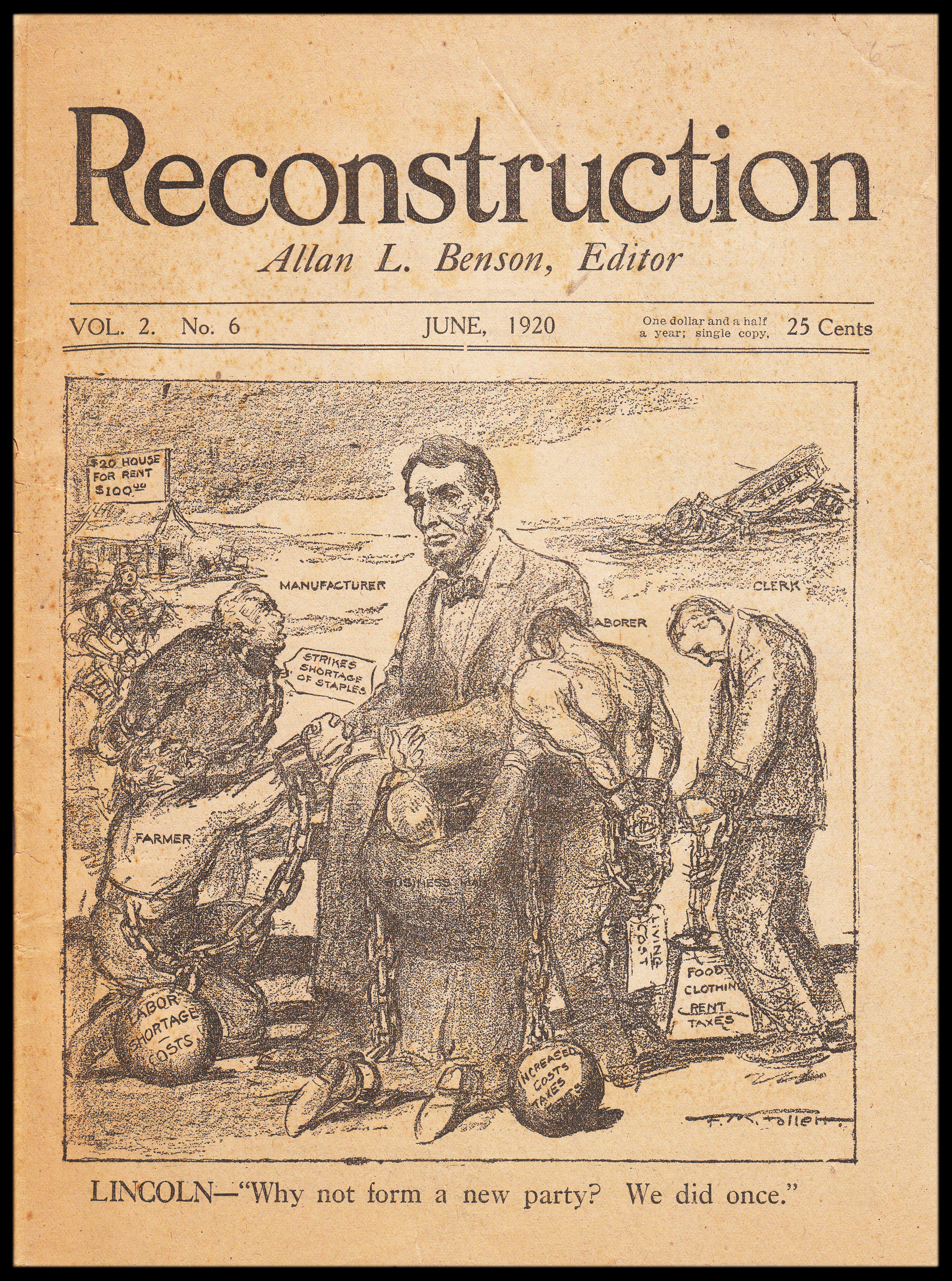
Cover of the June 1920 issue of Benson's magazine, Reconstruction

Although Benson had been an anti-war voice in the years leading up to World War I, in April 1917, the United States entered the conflict simultaneous with the Socialist Party's passage of a manifesto placing equal blame on Germany and the allies and vowing continued opposition to the conflict.

Benson broke his silence in June 1918 in The New Appeal, the new pro-war incarnation of the socialist weekly Appeal to Reason, with an article titled, "What's Wrong with the Socialist Party?" In this article Benson condemned as "anarchist" the idea that "the workers have no country," and accused "IWWs" with having conducted unceasing sabotage within the party against their opponents. In order to be respected, the Socialist Party "must be respectable," Benson declared, blaming the party's ills on "anarchists, falsely regarded as Socialists, aided and abetted by certain foreigners whose naturalization papers should be cancelled while they themselves are deported to the countries from which they came."

Having remained an inactive member of a party for a year, Benson formally severed his connection with the organization around the first of July 1918 in order to join a new pro-war political rival, the Social Democratic League of America. In the open letter announcing his decision, Benson declared that "nothing worse could happen to the world than to be placed under the heel of German imperialism" and indicated his refusal to participate further in an organization which "places the belligerents upon a parity." Benson repeated his charge that the Socialist Party had come to be dominated by "foreign-born leaders," assisted by an "anarchistic, syndicalistic minority."

Following his switch of organizational affiliation, Benson was hired by managing editor Emanuel Haldeman-Julius as a staff writer for The New Appeal, which had evolved into the semi-official organ of the Social Democratic League. Benson remained in this capacity through the end of the war.

From January 1919 through June 1921, Benson was the publisher of a new monthly magazine called Reconstruction, subtitled "A Herald of the New Time." The publication used a newsprint format similar to The Nation and The New Republic and advanced political line slightly to the right of those journals. Frequent contributors included former Socialists Charles Edward Russell and Max S. Hayes. A substantial run of the publication is present in the collection of the New York Public Library.

Benson's later years were spent housebound in Yonkers, New York. Several months before his death, Benson wrote a letter to cartoonist Art Young explaining his plight:

"I am suffering not from pernicious anemia but from the injury to my nervous system that this disease did when four dumbbell doctors (who were supposed to be good) did not recognize it for what it was and let it go until I collapsed, was in bed for six months and have scarcely been able to walk across the room ever since. I have been away from the house but seven times in nine years, for an hour's motor trip each time, and have not now been out in almost two years. I am in more or less distress all the time, but I read almost constantly and thus enjoy myself pretty well considering the circumstances."

== Death ==
Benson died in Yonkers, New York, on August 19, 1940.

== Works ==
- Confessions of Capitalism. Milwaukee: Social Democratic Publishing Co., 1904.
- Socialism Made Plain: Why the Few are Rich and the Many Poor. Milwaukee: Milwaukee Social-Democratic Publishing Co., 1904.
- New Zealand's Reply to Pessimism. Milwaukee: Milwaukee Social-Democratic Publishing Co., 1906.
- What Help Can Any Workingman Expect from Taft or Bryan? Chicago: National Headquarters, Socialist Party, 1908.
- "A Socialist on the Aspects of the Presidential Campaign," The Arena, vol. 40 (1908), pp. 321–324.
- The Usurped Power of the Courts. New York: Pearson Publishing Co., 1911.
- The Growing Grocery Bill. Chicago: National Headquarters, Socialist Party, 1912.
- Issues and Candidates. United States: s.n., 1912.
- The Truth about Socialism. New York: B.W. Huebsch, 1913.
- Our Dishonest Constitution. New York: B.W. Huebsch, 1914. A reprint of articles originally in Pearson's Magazine.
- Socialism: The Lone Foe of War. Chicago: Socialist Party, 1914.
- The Bombshell that Henry Ford Fired. Chicago: Socialist Party, 1914.
- What Ford Wages Have Done. Girard, KS: Appeal to Reason 1915.
- "Patriotism," Plunder and "Preparedness": Here are Some Facts which You Might Turn Over in Your Mind before Doing Any More Talking or Thinking about Our Need for More "Preparedness" for War. United States: s.n., 1912.
- A Way to Prevent War. Girard, KS: Appeal to Reason, 1915.
- Common Sense about the Navy. Washington: American Union Against Militarism, 1916.
- Inviting War to America New York, B.W. Huebsch, 1916
- "What's Wrong with the Socialist Party?" The New Appeal, whole no. 1,176 (June 15, 1918), pg. 1.
- "Why I Joined the Social Democratic League," The New Appeal, whole no. 1,183 (Aug. 3, 1918), pg. 1.
- The New Henry Ford. New York: Funk & Wagnalls Co., 1923.
- The Propaganda against Prohibition. Woman's National Committee for Law Enforcement, 1926.
- The Story of Geology. New York: Cosmopolitan Book Corporation, 1927.
- Daniel Webster. New York: Cosmopolitan Book Corporation, 1929.

== Footnotes ==
Party political offices
Preceded by Eugene V. Debs	Socialist nominee for President of the United States; 1916	Succeeded by Eugene V. Debs
