= 1920 Louisiana gubernatorial election =

1920 Louisiana Democratic gubernatorial primary
- January 20, 1920
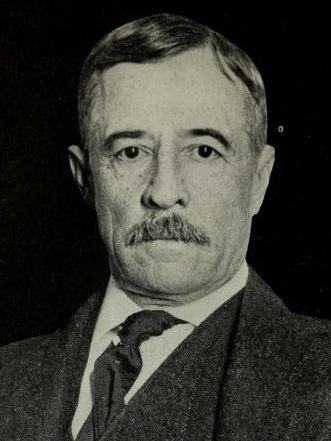

Candidate	John M. Parker	Frank Stubbs
Party	Democratic	Democratic
Popular vote	77,868	65,685
Percentage	54.24%	45.06%
- Parish results Parker: 50–60% 60–70% 70–80% 80–90% Stubbs: 50–60% 60–70% 70–80% 80–90%
Governor before election
Ruffin G. Pleasant
Democratic
Elected Governor
John M. Parker
Democratic

The 1920 Louisiana gubernatorial election was held on April 20, 1920. Like most Southern states between the Reconstruction Era and the Civil Rights Movement, Louisiana's Republican Party had virtually no electoral support. This meant that the Democratic Party primary held on January 20 was the real contest over who would be governor. The election resulted in the election of John M. Parker as governor of Louisiana.

== Democratic primary ==
=== Candidates ===
- John M. Parker, president of the New Orleans Cotton Exchange and Progressive nominee for Governor and Vice President of the United States in 1916
- Frank P. Stubbs

=== Results ===
1920 Louisiana Democratic primary
Party	Candidate	Votes	%
Democratic	John M. Parker	77,868	54.24%
Democratic	Frank P. Stubbs	65,685	45.76%
Total votes		143,553	100.00%

== General election ==
=== Candidates ===
- John M. Parker, president of the New Orleans Cotton Exchange and Progressive nominee for Governor and Vice President of the United States in 1916 (Democratic)
- J. Stewart Thompson (Republican)

=== Results ===
1920 Louisiana gubernatorial election
Party	Candidate	Votes	%	±%
Democratic	John M. Parker	53,792	97.56%	▲35.05
Republican	J. Stewart Thompson	1,305	2.44%	N/A
Write-in		39	0.00%	N/A
Total votes		55,136	100.00%	

== Sources ==
- State of Louisiana. Compilation of Primary Election Returns of the Democratic Party, State of Louisiana, 1920.

Preceded by 1916 gubernatorial election	Louisiana gubernatorial elections	Succeeded by 1924 gubernatorial election
