= 1916 United States presidential election in Louisiana =

- November 7, 1916

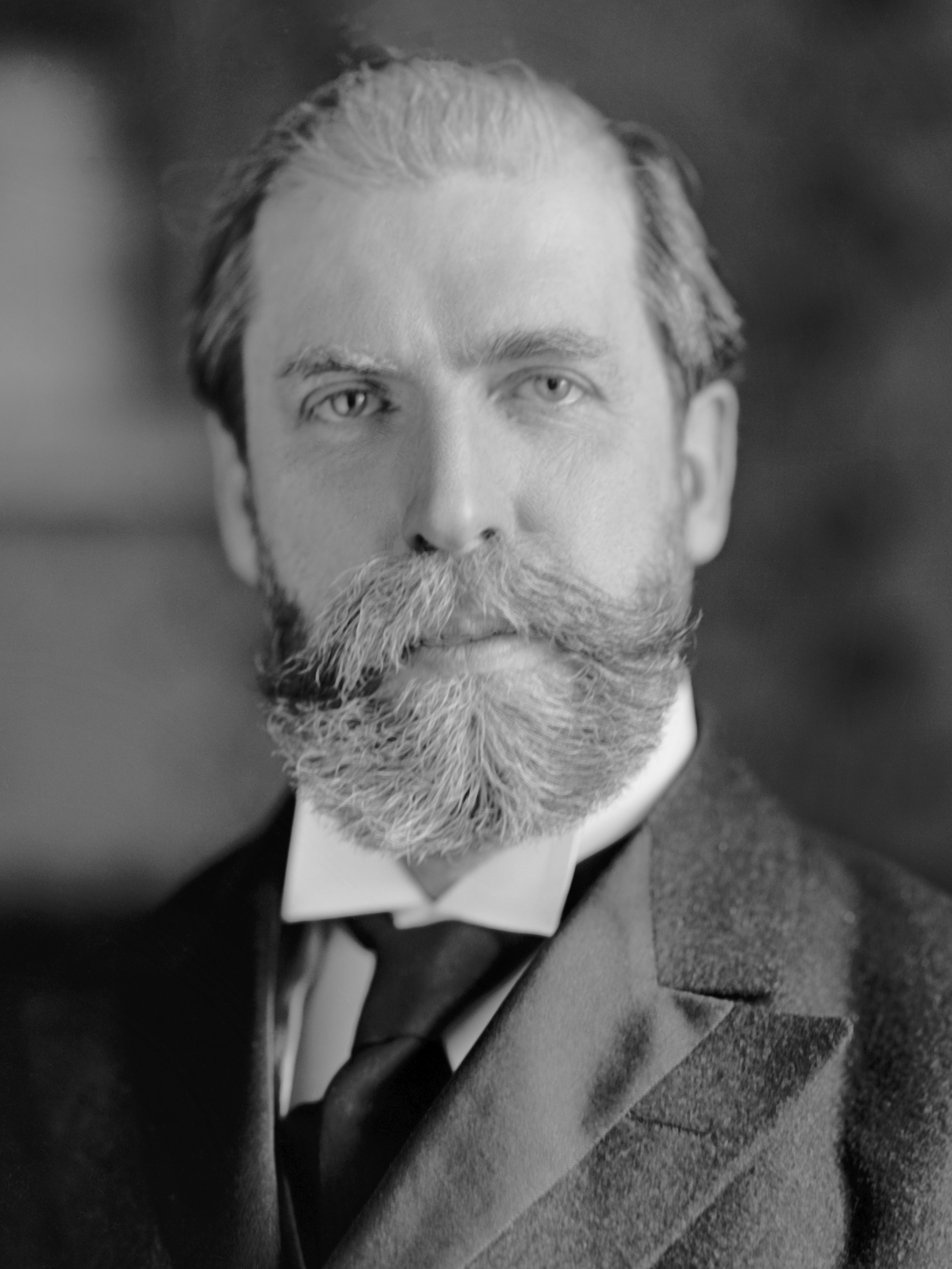

Nominee	Woodrow Wilson	Charles Evans Hughes	No candidate
Party	Democratic	Republican	Progressive
Home state	New Jersey	New York	N/A
Running mate	Thomas R. Marshall	Charles W. Fairbanks	John M. Parker
Electoral vote	10	0	0
Popular vote	79,875	6,466	6,349
Percentage	85.90%	6.95%	6.83%
Parish results
Wilson
30–40%
40–50%
50–60%
60–70%
70–80%
80–90%
90–100%
No Candidate
40–50%
50–60%
President before election
Woodrow Wilson
Democratic
Elected President
Woodrow Wilson
Democratic

The 1916 United States presidential election in Louisiana took place on November 7, 1916 as part of the 1916 United States presidential election. Voters chose ten representatives, or electors to the Electoral College, who voted for president and vice president.

Ever since the passage of a new constitution in 1898, Louisiana had been a one-party state dominated by the Democratic Party. The Republican Party became moribund due to the disenfranchisement of blacks and the complete absence of other support bases as Louisiana completely lacked upland or German refugee whites opposed to secession. Despite this absolute single-party dominance, non-partisan tendencies remained strong among wealthy sugar planters in Acadiana and within the business elite of New Orleans.

Following disfranchisement, the state's politics became dominated by the Choctaw Club of Louisiana, generally called the “Old Regulars”. This political machine was based in New Orleans and united with Black Belt cotton planters. Opposition emerged in the north and west of the state vis the Socialist Party, who elected a few officials in Winn Parish between 1908 and 1912, and by the Industrial Workers of the World in the lumbering parishes of Imperial Calcasieu. This opposition was mortally weakened almost immediately after the 1912 election by the unresolved conflict between electoral and antipolitical strategies for reform. Stronger opposition came via the Progressive movement soon after, although this time in the southern sugarcane-growing parishes, where conflicts with President Wilson's Underwood-Simmons Act even allowed a Progressive Party member in Whitmell P. Martin (Note: Martin would join the Democratic Party in 1919.) to be elected to the Third Congressional District in 1914.

Whereas Theodore Roosevelt's Progressive Party disintegrated after the 1914 elections in most of the United States, in Louisiana it had a brief revival during the following election cycle as John M. Parker, a long-time business progressive and wealthy landowner ran for governor against Democratic primary winner Ruffin G. Pleasant in April 1916, and at the same time sixteen Progressives were elected to the state legislature, the first time any non-Democrat had been so elected since before the 1898 Constitution. Despite carrying sixteen parishes – mostly in the sugar belt – Parker carried only 38 percent of the vote.

However, this would be the high point of the Progressive movement in Louisiana. Parker was nominated for vice-president by the national Progressive Party, but when Roosevelt declined the presidential place on this ticket and endorsed national Republican nominee Charles Evans Hughes, the top spot was left empty and Parker endorsed incumbent president Wilson. Despite this, opposition to Wilson's tariff policy in the sugar parishes was sufficient that the Progressive ticket did very well in this area, becoming the first non-Democrat to carry any Louisiana parish since 1900.

== Results ==
Presidential Candidate	Running Mate	Party	Electoral Vote (EV)	Popular Vote (PV)	
Woodrow Wilson of New Jersey	Thomas R. Marshall	Democratic	10	79,875	85.90%
Charles Evans Hughes	Charles W. Fairbanks	Republican	0	6,466	6.95%
—	John M. Parker	Progressive	0	6,349	6.83%
Allan L. Benson	George Ross Kirkpatrick	Socialist	0	292 (Note: These Socialist votes were not separated by parish but given only as a statewide total.)	0.31%

=== Results by parish ===
1916 United States presidential election in Louisiana by parish
Parish	Thomas Woodrow Wilson Democratic		Charles Evans Hughes Republican		No candidate Progressive "Bull Moose"		Margin		Total votes cast
Parish	#	%	#	%	#	%	#	%	Total votes cast
Acadia	1,165	83.87%	202	14.54%	22	1.58%	963	69.33%	1,389
Allen	708	89.51%	81	10.24%	2	0.25%	627	79.27%	791
Ascension	531	76.07%	106	15.19%	61	8.74%	425	60.89%	698
Assumption	489	45.15%	221	20.41%	373	34.44%	116 (Note: In this parish where Hughes ran third behind Wilson and the unpledged Progressive slate, margin given is Wilson vote minus Progressive vote and percentage margin Wilson percentage minus Progressive percentage.)	10.71%	1,083
Avoyelles	1,253	95.72%	44	3.36%	12	0.92%	1,209	92.36%	1,309
Beauregard	968	94.07%	59	5.73%	2	0.19%	909	88.34%	1,029
Bienville	1,229	98.01%	20	1.59%	5	0.40%	1,209	96.41%	1,254
Bossier	675	98.68%	9	1.32%	0	0.00%	666	97.37%	684
Caddo	3,109	95.25%	151	4.63%	4	0.12%	2,958	90.63%	3,264
Calcasieu	1,798	91.13%	165	8.36%	10	0.51%	1,633	82.77%	1,973
Caldwell	554	96.01%	20	3.47%	3	0.52%	534	92.55%	577
Cameron	163	94.22%	10	5.78%	0	0.00%	153	88.44%	173
Catahoula	459	95.63%	20	4.17%	1	0.21%	439	91.46%	480
Claiborne	1,276	98.76%	15	1.16%	1	0.08%	1,261	97.60%	1,292
Concordia	264	95.31%	10	3.61%	3	1.08%	254	91.70%	277
De Soto	1,104	98.48%	17	1.52%	0	0.00%	1,087	96.97%	1,121
East Baton Rouge	1,482	89.98%	130	7.89%	35	2.13%	1,352	82.09%	1,647
East Carroll	219	98.65%	3	1.35%	0	0.00%	216	97.30%	222
East Feliciana	489	95.69%	21	4.11%	1	0.20%	468	91.59%	511
Evangeline	808	92.77%	26	2.99%	37	4.25%	771	88.52%	871
Franklin	684	98.56%	10	1.44%	0	0.00%	674	97.12%	694
Grant	640	94.81%	31	4.59%	4	0.59%	609	90.22%	675
Iberia	802	44.90%	134	7.50%	850	47.59%	-48	-2.69%	1,786
Iberville	471	72.02%	160	24.46%	23	3.52%	311	47.55%	654
Jackson	980	97.13%	27	2.68%	2	0.20%	953	94.45%	1,009
Jefferson	1,041	94.21%	56	5.07%	8	0.72%	985	89.14%	1,105
Jefferson Davis	656	75.14%	200	22.91%	17	1.95%	456	52.23%	873
Lafayette	1,066	66.01%	73	4.52%	476	29.47%	590	36.53%	1,615
Lafourche	629	32.51%	157	8.11%	1,149	59.38%	-520	-26.87%	1,935
La Salle	610	95.61%	20	3.13%	8	1.25%	590	92.48%	638
Lincoln	932	95.30%	42	4.29%	4	0.41%	890	91.00%	978
Livingston	503	90.47%	35	6.29%	18	3.24%	468	84.17%	556
Madison	187	99.47%	1	0.53%	0	0.00%	186	98.94%	188
Morehouse	564	99.30%	3	0.53%	1	0.18%	561	98.77%	568
Natchitoches	1,181	95.78%	45	3.65%	7	0.57%	1,136	92.13%	1,233
Orleans	30,936	91.03%	2,531	7.45%	516	1.52%	28,405	83.59%	33,983
Ouachita	1,215	96.97%	35	2.79%	3	0.24%	1,180	94.17%	1,253
Plaquemines	461	90.22%	43	8.41%	7	1.37%	418	81.80%	511
Pointe Coupee	301	85.27%	37	10.48%	15	4.25%	264	74.79%	353
Rapides	2,184	93.25%	134	5.72%	24	1.02%	2,050	87.53%	2,342
Red River	567	99.30%	4	0.70%	0	0.00%	563	98.60%	571
Richland	650	98.93%	7	1.07%	0	0.00%	643	97.87%	657
Sabine	1,147	97.04%	30	2.54%	5	0.42%	1,117	94.50%	1,182
Saint Bernard	363	92.84%	23	5.88%	5	1.28%	340	86.96%	391
Saint Charles	297	90.00%	30	9.09%	3	0.91%	267	80.91%	330
Saint Helena	319	95.51%	9	2.69%	6	1.80%	310	92.81%	334
Saint James	520	71.53%	185	25.45%	22	3.03%	335	46.08%	727
Saint John the Baptist	289	70.15%	115	27.91%	8	1.94%	174	42.23%	412
Saint Landry	139	36.87%	117	31.03%	121	32.10%	18	4.77%	377
Saint Martin	971	69.41%	36	2.57%	392	28.02%	579	41.39%	1,399
Saint Mary	652	45.95%	162	11.42%	605	42.64%	47	3.31%	1,419
Saint Tammany	782	87.67%	95	10.65%	15	1.68%	687	77.02%	892
Tangipahoa	1,326	88.58%	159	10.62%	12	0.80%	1,167	77.96%	1,497
Tensas	204	96.68%	5	2.37%	2	0.95%	199	94.31%	211
Terrebonne	606	46.37%	113	8.65%	588	44.99%	18	1.38%	1,307
Union	1,106	97.96%	22	1.95%	1	0.09%	1,084	96.01%	1,129
Vermilion	1,340	59.56%	78	3.47%	832	36.98%	508	22.58%	2,250
Vernon	754	59.09%	44	3.45%	478	37.46%	276	21.63%	1,276
Washington	1,094	93.19%	66	5.62%	14	1.19%	1,028	87.56%	1,174
Webster	1,040	99.24%	6	0.57%	2	0.19%	1,034	98.66%	1,048
West Baton Rouge	237	87.78%	28	10.37%	5	1.85%	209	77.41%	270
West Carroll	311	95.11%	14	4.28%	2	0.61%	297	90.83%	327
West Feliciana	261	95.26%	8	2.92%	5	1.82%	253	92.34%	274
Winn	868	94.55%	50	5.45%	0	0.00%	818	89.11%	918
Totals	79,875	85.90%	6,466	6.95%	6,349	6.83%	73,409	78.95%	92,982

== See also ==
- United States presidential elections in Louisiana
