= Anne Ector Pleasant =

American school teacher

- 1932
- Born: Anne Ector; April 16, 1878; Marshall, Texas
- Died: September 13, 1934 (aged 56); Shreveport, Louisiana
- Other names: Anne Ector, Anne Pleasant
- Occupations: teacher, First Lady of Louisiana
- Years active: 1899-1934

Anne Ector Pleasant (April 16, 1878 – September 13, 1934) was an American school teacher and founder of the private school Pleasant Hall in Shreveport which operated for more than fifty years. Between 1916 and 1920, she was the First Lady of Louisiana and though she supported women's suffrage, she was not in favor of passage of the Nineteenth Amendment, believing voting rights were a state rather than a federal issue.

== Early life ==
Anne Ector was born on April 16, 1878, in Marshall, Texas to Sarah Parish "Sally" (née Chew) and General Matthew D. Ector. Her father was a brigadier general in the Confederate States Army, who was wounded during the Atlanta campaign in 1864 and then returned to Texas where he served as a judge. At the time of his death in 1879, he was the presiding judge of the Court of Appeals. Her mother was originally from Kentucky and after her husband's death raised Anne and her siblings, Helen, Walker and William. Ector attended Belwood Seminary in Anchorage, Kentucky and went on to further her schooling at the Sam Houston Normal Institute in Huntsville, Texas, graduating in 1899.

== Career ==
After completing her education, Ector began teaching in Texas and taught for several years until her marriage on February 14, 1906, to Ruffin Pleasant, who was the city attorney for Shreveport, Louisiana. After her marriage, Pleasant was active in the woman's club movement, serving as president of the district Federation of Women's Clubs, while her husband served for six years as city attorney and then worked in private practice as a lawyer. He was appointed as assistant attorney general in 1911, causing the couple to move to New Orleans and then was made attorney general in 1912. After four years, he was elected as Governor of Louisiana. During his governorship, Pleasant was active in the suffrage movement. While she was in favor of women's suffrage, she was against the passage of the Nineteenth Amendment to the United States Constitution, believing that states, rather than the federal government should determine who should be eligible to vote.

In 1920, when her term as First Lady ended, the couple returned to Shreveport. Within three years, Pleasant, who had been privately tutoring students in her home, opened Pleasant Hall, a private elementary school. The school focused on basic studies in reading, writing and arithmetic, but also offered instruction in French, English grammar and both music and art. Classes were held in the couple's home, which was located at 1703 Highland Avenue, on the corner with Wyandotte Street.

Pleasant was known as an opponent of Louisiana politician Huey Long and the two had a history of oral conflicts. In 1933, she made national headlines when she sued Long, alleging that while investigating documentation on nepotism and "questionable use and disposition" of the public's taxes in government institutions, she was removed from the courthouse, arrested and slandered when Long called her a "drunken, cursing woman". Initially, she asked for $250,000, but the amended her petition to double the amount, when she felt Long was trying to intimidate her. Long tried to have the case dismissed on the grounds that under Louisiana law Pleasant could not sue in her own name, as under the state community property law, the suit would only be proper if filed in her husband's name. District Judge W. Carruth Jones rejected the argument based on similar cases that had been elevated to the Supreme Court.

== Death and legacy ==
Pleasant died on September 13, 1934, after having accidentally consumed antiseptic which she had mistaken for her medication. After her death, her husband took over the operation of Pleasant Hall and ran it until his death in 1937. When he died, his sister, Mrs. Lucille Johnson took over the management of the school, which continued operating until the 1970s and maintained a reputation for its high educational standard in liberal arts. The home where the school was housed is noted by a tourist marker, as the last remaining home in Shreveport occupied by a state governor.
