= 1916 United States presidential election in Pennsylvania =

- November 7, 1916
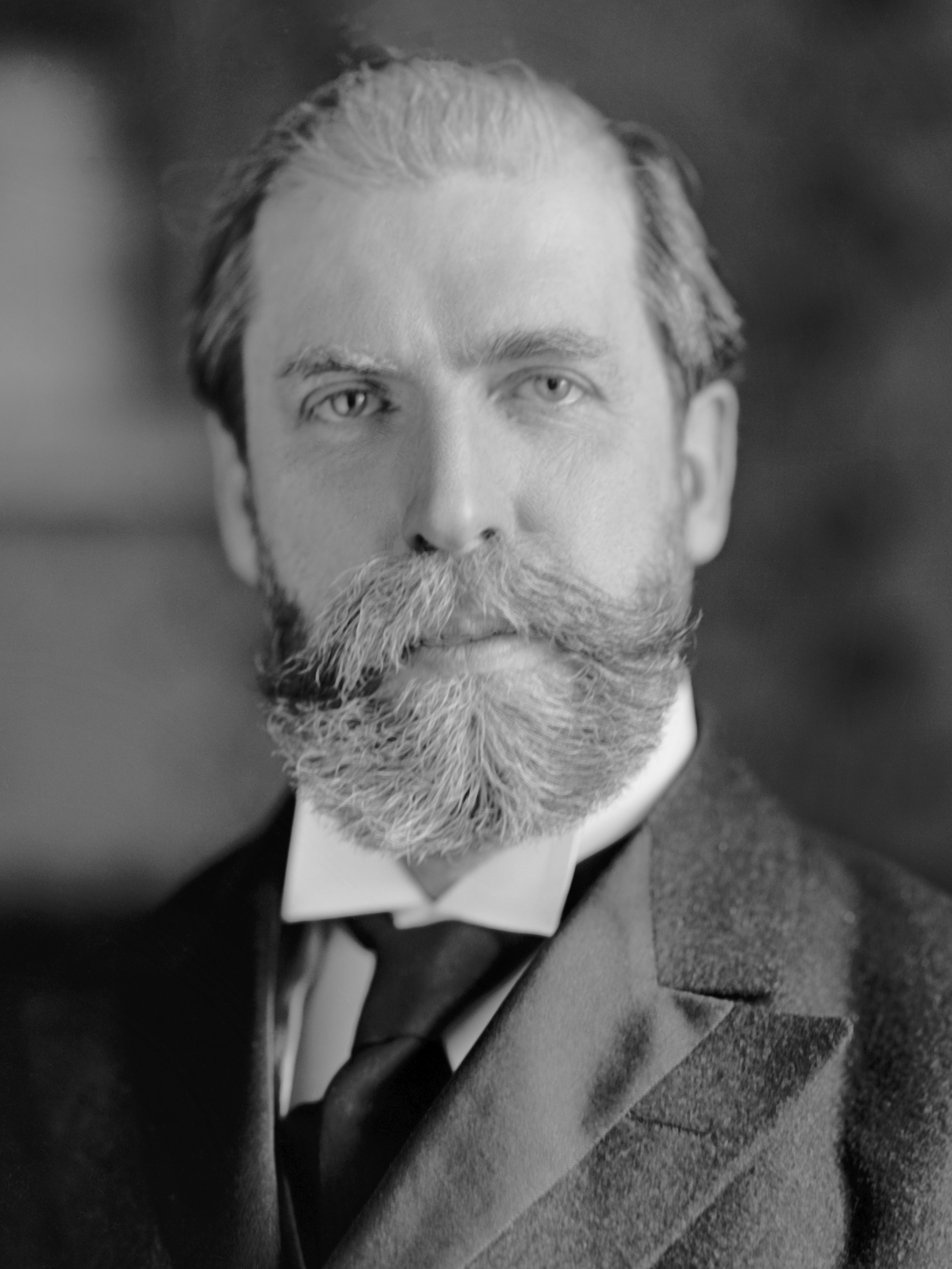

Nominee	Charles Evans Hughes	Woodrow Wilson
Party	Republican	Democratic
Home state	New York	New Jersey
Running mate	Charles W. Fairbanks	Thomas R. Marshall
Electoral vote	38	0
Popular vote	703,823	521,784
Percentage	54.26%	40.22%
County results
Hughes
40–50%
50–60%
60–70%
Wilson
40–50%
50–60%
60–70%
President before election
Woodrow Wilson
Democratic
Elected President
Woodrow Wilson
Democratic

The 1916 United States presidential election in Pennsylvania took place on November 7, 1916, as part of the 1916 United States presidential election. Voters chose 38 representatives, or electors to the Electoral College, who voted for president and vice president.

Pennsylvania overwhelmingly voted for the Republican nominee, U.S. Supreme Court Justice and former New York Governor Charles Evans Hughes, over the Democratic nominee, President Woodrow Wilson. Hughes won Pennsylvania by a large margin of 14.04%. New York voted for Hughes by exactly half the margin (7.02%).

With 56.26% of the vote, Pennsylvania would prove to be Hughes's third strongest state in terms of popular votes percentage after Vermont and neighboring New Jersey. Wilson is one of three presidents (along with George W. Bush and Grover Cleveland) to win two terms without ever carrying the state, and the only Democrat to do so in two consecutive elections (Cleveland won two non-consecutive elections in 1884 and 1892).

== Results ==
1916 United States presidential in Pennsylvania
Party	Candidate	Votes	Percentage	Electoral votes
Republican	Charles Evans Hughes	703,823	54.26%	38
Democratic	Woodrow Wilson (incumbent)	521,784	40.22%	0
Socialist	Allan Benson	42,638	3.29%	0
Prohibition	James Hanly	28,525	2.20%	0
Socialist Labor	Arthur Reimer	419	0.03%	0
Totals		1,297,189	100.00%	38

=== Results by county ===
County	Charles Evans Hughes Republican		Woodrow Wilson Democratic		Allan L. Benson Socialist		Frank Hanly Prohibition		Arthur E. Reimer Socialist Labor		Margin		Total votes cast
County	#	%	#	%	#	%	#	%	#	%	#	%	Total votes cast
Adams	3,290	43.76%	3,963	52.71%	82	1.09%	184	2.45%	0	0.00%	-673	-8.95%	7,519
Allegheny	77,483	55.24%	52,833	37.67%	7,815	5.57%	2,052	1.46%	81	0.06%	24,650	17.57%	140,264
Armstrong	6,024	58.51%	3,590	34.87%	316	3.07%	364	3.54%	2	0.02%	2,434	23.64%	10,296
Beaver	6,864	48.67%	5,805	41.16%	904	6.41%	526	3.73%	4	0.03%	1,059	7.51%	14,103
Bedford	3,729	50.79%	3,263	44.44%	238	3.24%	112	1.53%	0	0.00%	466	6.35%	7,342
Berks	11,937	34.33%	19,267	55.41%	3,146	9.05%	393	1.13%	26	0.07%	-7,330	-21.08%	34,769
Blair	9,893	55.16%	7,002	39.04%	491	2.74%	519	2.89%	30	0.17%	2,891	16.12%	17,935
Bradford	6,178	57.51%	3,655	34.03%	200	1.86%	707	6.58%	2	0.02%	2,523	23.49%	10,742
Bucks	9,269	53.97%	7,491	43.62%	238	1.39%	172	1.00%	4	0.02%	1,778	10.35%	17,174
Butler	5,458	47.19%	4,544	39.28%	211	1.82%	1,351	11.68%	3	0.03%	914	7.90%	11,567
Cambria	10,688	49.87%	9,416	43.94%	725	3.38%	593	2.77%	8	0.04%	1,272	5.94%	21,430
Cameron	713	59.17%	452	37.51%	15	1.24%	25	2.07%	0	0.00%	261	21.66%	1,205
Carbon	4,275	49.18%	4,099	47.15%	179	2.06%	138	1.59%	2	0.02%	176	2.02%	8,693
Centre	4,392	50.02%	4,120	46.92%	122	1.39%	146	1.66%	1	0.01%	272	3.10%	8,781
Chester	11,845	56.77%	8,514	40.81%	204	0.98%	295	1.41%	6	0.03%	3,331	15.97%	20,864
Clarion	2,595	41.07%	3,269	51.74%	175	2.77%	278	4.40%	1	0.02%	-674	-10.67%	6,318
Clearfield	5,676	42.68%	6,180	46.47%	816	6.14%	624	4.69%	3	0.02%	-504	-3.79%	13,299
Clinton	2,794	45.14%	2,967	47.93%	344	5.56%	82	1.32%	3	0.05%	-173	-2.79%	6,190
Columbia	3,013	32.80%	5,785	62.97%	116	1.26%	272	2.96%	1	0.01%	-2,772	-30.17%	9,187
Crawford	5,487	44.18%	5,814	46.81%	526	4.24%	590	4.75%	3	0.02%	-327	-2.63%	12,420
Cumberland	5,296	42.99%	6,432	52.21%	167	1.36%	421	3.42%	3	0.02%	-1,136	-9.22%	12,319
Dauphin	13,954	52.16%	11,483	42.92%	841	3.14%	470	1.76%	4	0.01%	2,471	9.24%	26,752
Delaware	16,315	65.96%	7,742	31.30%	212	0.86%	464	1.88%	1	0.00%	8,573	34.66%	24,734
Elk	2,829	52.34%	2,186	40.44%	225	4.16%	163	3.02%	2	0.04%	643	11.90%	5,405
Erie	8,933	43.30%	9,641	46.73%	1,000	4.85%	1,035	5.02%	21	0.10%	-708	-3.43%	20,630
Fayette	9,838	45.70%	10,416	48.38%	849	3.94%	425	1.97%	1	0.00%	-578	-2.68%	21,529
Forest	617	47.03%	463	35.29%	110	8.38%	113	8.61%	9	0.69%	154	11.74%	1,312
Franklin	5,674	48.86%	5,336	45.95%	325	2.80%	276	2.38%	1	0.01%	338	2.91%	11,612
Fulton	802	39.62%	1,199	59.24%	12	0.59%	11	0.54%	0	0.00%	-397	-19.61%	2,024
Greene	2,096	33.93%	3,930	63.62%	67	1.08%	83	1.34%	1	0.02%	-1,834	-29.69%	6,177
Huntingdon	3,806	60.23%	2,181	34.51%	169	2.67%	162	2.56%	1	0.02%	1,625	25.72%	6,319
Indiana	4,887	57.65%	2,398	28.29%	381	4.49%	808	9.53%	3	0.04%	2,489	29.36%	8,477
Jefferson	4,332	51.74%	3,253	38.85%	445	5.31%	341	4.07%	2	0.02%	1,079	12.89%	8,373
Juniata	1,254	44.66%	1,497	53.31%	32	1.14%	24	0.85%	1	0.04%	-243	-8.65%	2,808
Lackawanna	17,658	50.80%	15,727	45.25%	598	1.72%	764	2.20%	11	0.03%	1,931	5.56%	34,758
Lancaster	20,292	63.42%	10,016	31.30%	551	1.72%	1,117	3.49%	20	0.06%	10,276	32.12%	31,996
Lawrence	5,134	49.44%	3,966	38.19%	602	5.80%	680	6.55%	3	0.03%	1,168	11.25%	10,385
Lebanon	5,876	57.45%	3,821	37.36%	211	2.06%	320	3.13%	0	0.00%	2,055	20.09%	10,228
Lehigh	10,588	44.67%	11,920	50.29%	890	3.75%	300	1.27%	4	0.02%	-1,332	-5.62%	23,702
Luzerne	25,348	53.73%	19,999	42.39%	1,249	2.65%	575	1.22%	8	0.02%	5,349	11.34%	47,179
Lycoming	6,010	41.53%	6,640	45.88%	1,087	7.51%	728	5.03%	8	0.06%	-630	-4.35%	14,473
McKean	4,300	51.81%	3,161	38.09%	487	5.87%	348	4.19%	3	0.04%	1,139	13.72%	8,299
Mercer	5,866	42.66%	6,390	46.47%	725	5.27%	766	5.57%	4	0.03%	-524	-3.81%	13,751
Mifflin	2,105	47.38%	1,965	44.23%	277	6.23%	95	2.14%	1	0.02%	140	3.15%	4,443
Monroe	1,456	29.80%	3,348	68.52%	17	0.35%	65	1.33%	0	0.00%	-1,892	-38.72%	4,886
Montgomery	20,431	58.25%	13,658	38.94%	721	2.06%	257	0.73%	5	0.01%	6,773	19.31%	35,072
Montour	1,068	40.11%	1,530	57.45%	16	0.60%	48	1.80%	1	0.04%	-462	-17.35%	2,663
Northampton	9,610	44.37%	11,000	50.79%	457	2.11%	588	2.71%	4	0.02%	-1,390	-6.42%	21,659
Northumberland	8,722	45.00%	9,333	48.15%	1,012	5.22%	305	1.57%	12	0.06%	-611	-3.15%	19,384
Perry	2,575	51.46%	2,348	46.92%	30	0.60%	50	1.00%	1	0.02%	227	4.54%	5,004
Philadelphia	194,163	66.81%	90,800	31.25%	4,716	1.62%	874	0.30%	48	0.02%	103,363	35.57%	290,601
Pike	598	37.19%	976	60.70%	14	0.87%	20	1.24%	0	0.00%	-378	-23.51%	1,608
Potter	2,386	52.54%	1,733	38.16%	243	5.35%	179	3.94%	0	0.00%	653	14.38%	4,541
Schuylkill	17,806	55.03%	13,396	41.40%	909	2.81%	239	0.74%	7	0.02%	4,410	13.63%	32,357
Snyder	1,797	57.74%	1,247	40.07%	48	1.54%	20	0.64%	0	0.00%	550	17.67%	3,112
Somerset	6,008	61.31%	2,957	30.17%	527	5.38%	306	3.12%	2	0.02%	3,051	31.13%	9,800
Sullivan	888	43.96%	1,037	51.34%	21	1.04%	74	3.66%	0	0.00%	-149	-7.38%	2,020
Susquehanna	3,891	53.08%	3,145	42.91%	28	0.38%	263	3.59%	3	0.04%	746	10.18%	7,330
Tioga	5,347	66.41%	2,294	28.49%	91	1.13%	316	3.92%	4	0.05%	3,053	37.92%	8,052
Union	1,902	58.06%	1,272	38.83%	44	1.34%	57	1.74%	1	0.03%	630	19.23%	3,276
Venango	3,856	40.98%	3,938	41.85%	553	5.88%	1,060	11.26%	3	0.03%	-82	-0.87%	9,410
Warren	3,413	47.79%	2,628	36.80%	346	4.85%	749	10.49%	5	0.07%	785	10.99%	7,141
Washington	10,367	52.47%	7,747	39.21%	1,056	5.34%	587	2.97%	2	0.01%	2,620	13.26%	19,759
Wayne	2,869	55.84%	2,019	39.30%	52	1.01%	197	3.83%	1	0.02%	850	16.54%	5,138
Westmoreland	15,283	46.68%	13,829	42.24%	2,591	7.91%	1,017	3.11%	17	0.05%	1,454	4.44%	32,737
Wyoming	1,698	52.12%	1,444	44.32%	41	1.26%	74	2.27%	1	0.03%	254	7.80%	3,258
York	12,276	40.12%	16,314	53.32%	730	2.39%	1,268	4.14%	10	0.03%	-4,038	-13.20%	30,598
Totals	703,823	54.26%	521,784	40.22%	42,638	3.29%	28,525	2.20%	419	0.03%	182,039	14.03%	1,297,189

== See also ==
- United States presidential elections in Pennsylvania
