= 1916 United States presidential election =

Re-election of Woodrow Wilson

- November 7, 1916

531 members of the Electoral College 266 electoral votes needed to win
- Turnout: 61.8% (▲2.8 pp)

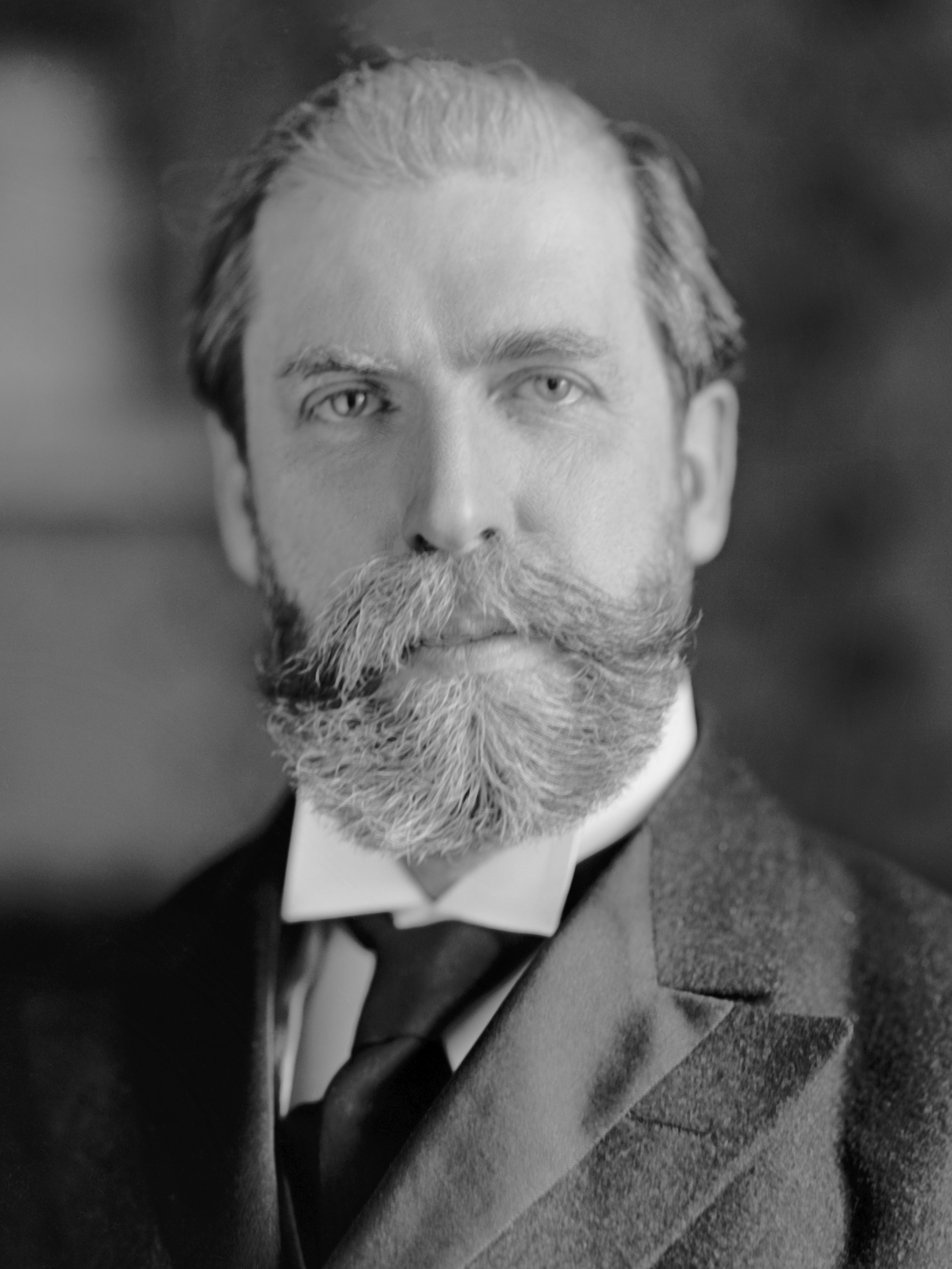
Nominee	Woodrow Wilson	Charles Evans Hughes
Party	Democratic	Republican
Home state	New Jersey	New York
Running mate	Thomas R. Marshall	Charles W. Fairbanks
Electoral vote	277	254
States carried	30	18
Popular vote	9,126,868	8,548,728
Percentage	49.2%	46.1%
- Presidential election results map. Blue denotes states won by Wilson/Marshall, red denotes those won by Hughes/Fairbanks. Numbers indicate the number of electoral votes allotted to each state.
President before election
Woodrow Wilson
Democratic
Elected President
Woodrow Wilson
Democratic

A presidential election was held in the United States on November 7, 1916. The Democratic ticket of incumbent president Woodrow Wilson and incumbent vice president Thomas Marshall defeated the Republican ticket of former associate justice of the Supreme Court Charles Evans Hughes and former vice president Charles Fairbanks by a narrow margin. Wilson was the first incumbent Democrat since 1832 to win re-election to a second consecutive term. (Note: This excludes Grover Cleveland, who was elected to a non-consecutive second term in 1892 after having previously been elected in 1884 and defeated for re-election in 1888.)

In June, the 1916 Republican National Convention chose Hughes as a compromise between the conservative and progressive wings of the party. Hughes was on the Supreme Court in 1912 and was not involved in the bitter politics of that year. He defeated John W. Weeks, Elihu Root, and several other candidates on the third ballot. While conservative and progressive Republicans had been divided in the 1912 election between the candidacies of incumbent President William Howard Taft and former President Theodore Roosevelt, they largely united around Hughes in his bid to oust Wilson. Hughes remains the only person to have served as a Supreme Court justice and later been a major party's presidential nominee. Wilson was renominated at the 1916 Democratic National Convention, as was Vice President Thomas R. Marshall, both without opposition. Hughes's running mate was Charles W. Fairbanks, who had been Theodore Roosevelt's vice president in his second term.

Although many saw Hughes as the favorite to win, Wilson defeated him by nearly 600,000 votes out of about 18.5 million cast in the popular vote. Wilson secured a narrow majority in the Electoral College by sweeping the Solid South and winning several swing states with razor-thin margins. Wilson won California, the tipping point state, by a slim margin. Wilson's top vote-getting elector received just 3,773 more votes than Hughes's top vote-getting elector. Since the GOP was not as split as in 1912, Wilson did not have the same easy victory as he had four years earlier, losing his home state of New Jersey along with the states of Connecticut, Delaware, Illinois, Marshall's home state of Indiana, Iowa, Maine, Massachusetts, New York, Oregon, Rhode Island, West Virginia (although he still won an electoral vote from the state), and Wisconsin. However, Wilson still managed to win two states that he had lost in 1912 (Utah and Washington), and fully won California after having only obtained two out of 13 electoral votes from California in 1912. The Socialist party under Allan L. Benson received 3.19% of the vote. This resulted in no candidate securing a majority in California, Washington, North Dakota, or New Hampshire, with the Prohibition party also receiving 1.19% of the vote.

== Nominations ==
=== Democratic Party nomination ===
Democratic Party (United States) 1916 Democratic Party ticket
Woodrow Wilson	Thomas R. Marshall
for president	for vice president
28th President of the United States (1913–1921)	28th Vice President of the United States (1913–1921)
HCV: 1,092 votes 1,202,492 votes

The 1916 Democratic National Convention was held in St. Louis, Missouri between June 14 and 16. Given Wilson's incumbency and enormous popularity within the party, he was overwhelmingly re-nominated. Vice President Thomas R. Marshall was also re-nominated with no opposition.

=== Republican Party nomination ===
Republican Party (United States) 1916 Republican Party ticket
Charles Evans Hughes	Charles W. Fairbanks
for president	for vice president
Associate Justice of the U.S. Supreme Court (1910–1916)	26th Vice President of the United States (1905–1909)
ID: 18 delegates HCV: 950 votes 82,530 votes

==== Other major candidates ====
Candidates in this section are sorted by their highest vote count on the nominating ballots
John W. Weeks	Elihu Root	Charles W. Fairbanks	Albert B. Cummins	Theodore Roosevelt	Theodore E. Burton
U.S. Senator from Massachusetts (1913–1919)	U.S. Senator from New York (1909–1915)	U.S. Vice President from Indiana (1905–1909)	U.S. Senator from Iowa (1908–1926)	U.S. President from New York (1901–1909)	U.S. Senator from Ohio (1909–1915)
W:Before Third Ballot; ID: 0 delegates HCV: 105 votes 0 votes	W:In Midst of Third Ballot; ID: 0 delegates HCV: 103 votes 786 votes	W:In Midst of Third Ballot; ID: 40 delegates HCV: 89 votes 176,080 votes	ID: 82 delegates HCV: 85 votes 191,951 votes	ID: 14 delegates HCV: 81 votes 83,739 votes	W:In Midst of Third Ballot; ID: 40 delegates HCV: 78 votes 122,169 votes
Lawrence Y. Sherman	Philander C. Knox	Henry Ford	Martin G. Brumbaugh	Robert M. La Follette	T. Coleman du Pont
U.S. Senator from Illinois (1913–1921)	Secretary of State from Pennsylvania (1909–1913)	President of the Ford Motor Company from Michigan (1906–1919)	Governor of Pennsylvania (1915–1919)	U.S. Senator from Wisconsin (1906–1925)	President of DuPont from Delaware (?–1915)
ID: 56 delegates W:Before Third Ballot; HCV: 66 votes 155,945 votes	ID: 0 delegates NFN; HCV: 36 votes 386 votes	ID: 32 delegates NFN; HCV: 32 votes 131,965 votes	ID: 19 delegates W:Before Second Ballot; HCV: 29 votes 233,100 votes	ID: 25 delegates HCV: 25 votes 133,486 votes	ID: 6 delegates HCV: 13 votes 0 votes

==== Convention ====
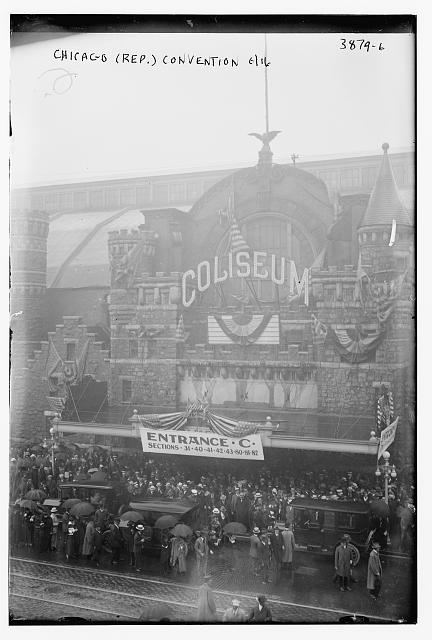
Republican Convention, The Coliseum, Chicago

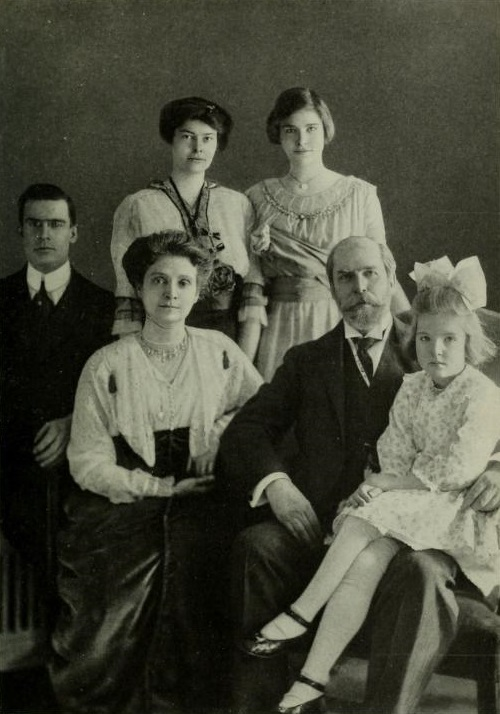
Hughes and his Family

The 1916 Republican National Convention was held in Chicago between June 7 and 10.

A major goal of the party leaders was to heal the bitter split that ripped the party apart in 1912. Although several candidates were openly competing for the 1916 nomination — most prominently Senator Elihu Root of New York and Senator John W. Weeks of Massachusetts — the leaders wanted a moderate who would be acceptable to both factions.

They turned to Supreme Court Justice Charles Evans Hughes, who had been serving on the court since 1910 and had the advantage of not having publicly spoken about political issues in six years. Although he had not actively sought the nomination, Hughes made it known that he would not turn it down. He won the nomination on the third ballot. Former Vice President Charles W. Fairbanks was nominated as his running mate. Hughes remains, as of today, the only serving Supreme Court justice to be nominated for president by a major political party.

Ballot	1	2	3
Charles Evans Hughes	253	326	950
John W. Weeks	105	102	2
Elihu Root	103	89	9
Charles W. Fairbanks	89	75	7
Albert B. Cummins	85	77	2
Theodore Roosevelt	81	65	19
Theodore E. Burton	78	69	9
Lawrence Yates Sherman	66	59	5
Philander C. Knox	36	30	6
Henry Ford	32	29	9
Martin Grove Brumbaugh	29	22	2
Robert M. La Follette	25	25	23
William Howard Taft	14	4	0
T. Coleman du Pont	7	13	6
Henry Cabot Lodge	7	2	0
John Wanamaker	5	1	1
Frank B. Willis	1	2	2
William Borah	2	0	2
Warren G. Harding	1	0	1
Samuel W. McCall	0	1	1
Leonard Wood	0	1	1

=== Progressive Party nomination ===
1916 Progressive Party ticket
None	John Parker
for president	for vice president
N/A	Businessman and 1916 nominee for Governor of Louisiana

==== Candidates considered ====
Candidates considered
Theodore Roosevelt	Victor Murdock	Hiram Johnson	Gifford Pinchot
U.S. President from New York (1901–1909)	U.S. Representative from Kansas (1903–1915)	Governor of California (1911–1917)	Chief of the U.S. Forest Service from Pennsylvania (1905–1910)
DN	NFN	DI	DI

The Progressive Party re-nominated former President Theodore Roosevelt.

For Vice President, Progressives nominated businessman John M. Parker of Louisiana, who had run an unsuccessful campaign. California Governor Hiram Johnson was suggested for renomination, and Raymond Robins, chairman of the party convention, was proposed, but both withdrew their names in favor of Parker.

However, Roosevelt telegraphed the convention and declared that he could not accept their nomination and would be endorsing Republican nominee Charles Evans Hughes for the presidency. Roosevelt turned down the Progressive nomination for both personal and political reasons. He was convinced that running for president on a third-party ticket again would merely give the election to the Democrats and had developed a strong dislike for President Wilson. He also believed Wilson was allowing Germany and other warring nations in Europe to "bully" and intimidate the United States.

Former U.S. representative Victor Murdock of Kansas pushed for a ticket consisting of William Jennings Bryan and Henry Ford but nothing came of it. Some, such as National Committeeman Harold L. Ickes, refused to consider endorsing Hughes. There was some talk of replacing Roosevelt with Hiram Johnson or Gifford Pinchot. All those discussed refused to consider the notion, and by this point, some leaders such as Henry Justin Allen had started to follow Roosevelt's lead and endorsed Hughes. Various state parties, such as those in Iowa and Maine, began to disband.

Finally, when the Progressive Party National Committee met in Chicago on June 26, those in attendance begrudgingly endorsed Hughes; even those like Ickes who had vehemently refused to consider granting an endorsement to Hughes began to recognize that without Roosevelt the party had no electoral staying power. There had been a weak attempt to replace Roosevelt on the ticket with Victor Murdock, but the motion was defeated 31 to 15.

With Roosevelt refusing their nomination, the Progressive Party quickly fell into disarray. Most members returned to the Republican Party, but a substantial minority supported Wilson for his efforts in keeping the United States out of World War I.

Without a presidential nominee, many in the party, notably vice-presidential nominee John M. Parker and Bainbridge Colby, remained steadfast in their refusal to support Hughes. Parker desired the presidential nomination himself. Colby, while opposed to the endorsement of Hughes, now considered a Progressive campaign impractical and privately supported Wilson. It appeared likely for a time that another convention would be called in early August, until a conference held among the remaining representatives of the party in Indianapolis decided against it, while also narrowly voting against filling the vacancy that had been caused by Roosevelt's refusal to be placed on the ticket (though Parker remained the vice-presidential nominee). Electoral tickets would still be put in place where the Progressive Party remained organized in the hopes of electing enough electors so as to possibly hold the balance of power in a close contest between the Democratic and Republican candidates.

While running as the vice-presidential nominee, John Parker would endorse Woodrow Wilson for the presidency.

=== Socialist Party nomination ===
1916 Socialist Party ticket
Allan L. Benson	George R. Kirkpatrick
for president	for vice president
Newspaper Editor from New York	Writer and Political Activist from New Jersey

==== Other candidates ====
Candidates in this section are sorted by number of votes received in the Mail-In Primary
James H. Maurer	Arthur LeSueur
State Representative from Pennsylvania (1915–1919)	Newspaper Editor from North Dakota
12,264 votes	3,495 votes

Eugene V. Debs and Charles Edward Russell declined to run for the nomination. Debs, who had served as the party's presidential nominee since its foundation, chose to run for a seat in the United States House of Representatives from Indiana's 5th congressional district. Allan Benson, a newspaper editor from New York, quickly came to dominate the field on a platform of his fervent opposition to militarism and proposal that all wars should be voted upon in a national referendum. Rather than a traditional nominating convention, the vote was conducted through a mail-order ballot, with Benson capturing 16,639 out of a total of 32,398 cast (to 12,264 for Maurer and 3,495 for Le Sueur). A vote for the vice-presidential nomination was jointly held with George Ross Kirkpatrick, a lecturer from New Jersey, winning the nomination 20,607 to 11,388 over Kate Richards O'Hare of Missouri.

=== Prohibition Party nomination ===
1916 Prohibition Party ticket
Frank Hanly	Ira Landrith
for president	for vice president
26th Governor of Indiana (1905–1909)	Minister and Temperance Activist from Tennessee

==== Other candidates ====
Candidates in this section are sorted by their highest vote count on the nominating ballots
William Sulzer

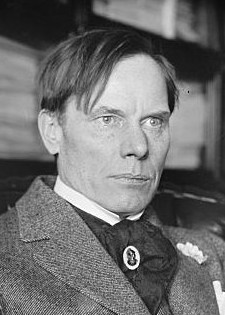

State assemblyman
from New York
(1914–1914)
181 votes

The twelfth Prohibition National Convention assembled in Saint Paul, Minnesota, on July 19. Before the convention a number of figures were considered potential nominees for the presidency, among them former Democratic presidential nominee William Jennings Bryan, former governor of New York William Sulzer, former governor of Massachusetts Eugene Foss, former governor of Indiana Frank Hanly, former general Nelson Miles, and former Alabama Congressman Richmond Hobson; Sulzer and Hanly ultimately were the only two to actively campaign for the nomination. It was generally recognized early on that Hanly's nomination was favored with a supporter of his, Robert Patton, being named as permanent chairman of the convention. This culminated with the adoption of much of his program into the Party platform and his own nomination for the presidency, Hanly receiving 440 votes to Sulzer's 181. Ira Landrith, a Presbyterian minister from Tennessee and member of the Flying Squadron of America was nominated for the vice presidency after other names were withdrawn from contention before the first ballot.

== World War as an issue ==
The campaign took place against a background dominated by World War I in Europe. The U.S. was officially neutral, but public opinion tended to favor Britain and therefore the Allied cause led by Great Britain, France and Russia against the German Empire and Austria-Hungary. Americans were troubled by the harsh treatment of Belgian civilians by the German Army and the militaristic character of the German monarchy. Conversely, large communities of German Americans and Irish Americans were strongly against helping Britain.

Despite pro-Entente sentiment, most American voters wanted to avoid involvement in the war and preferred to continue a policy of neutrality. Wilson's campaign used the popular slogans "He kept us out of war" and "America First" to appeal to those voters who wanted to avoid a war in Europe or with Mexico. Hughes criticized Wilson for not taking the "necessary preparations" to face a conflict. In 1915–1917 Theodore Roosevelt was the leading proponent of America entering the war on the side of Great Britain. He campaigned for the Republican ticket on the argument that the United States had a moral obligation to support the Allies and that neutrality, as President Wilson was promising, was both cowardly and dangerous. In October, 1916, Roosevelt lashed out:

President Wilson's ignoble shirking of responsibility has been clothed in an utterly misleading phrase, the phrase of a coward, He kept us out of war. In actual reality, war has been creeping nearer and nearer... and we face it without policy, plan, purpose or preparation.

== General election ==
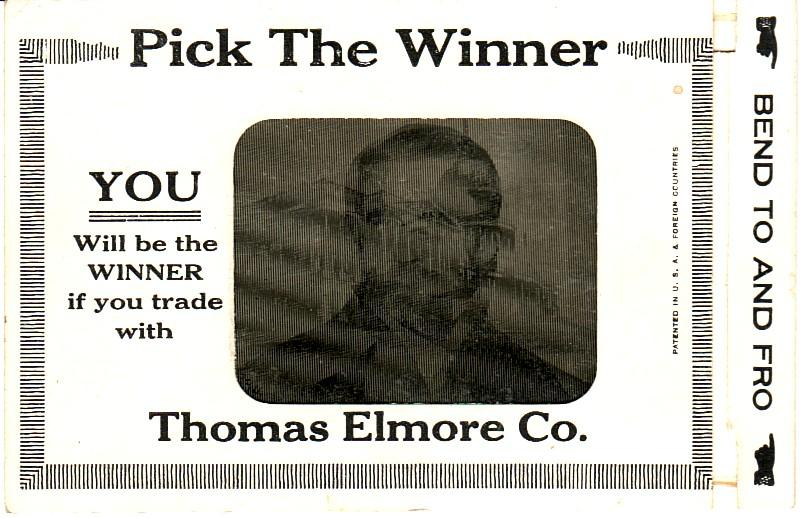
Business advertising postcard exploiting public interest in the election; parts of Wilson's and Hughes' faces can be seen in this image, with the U.S. Capitol building in the background

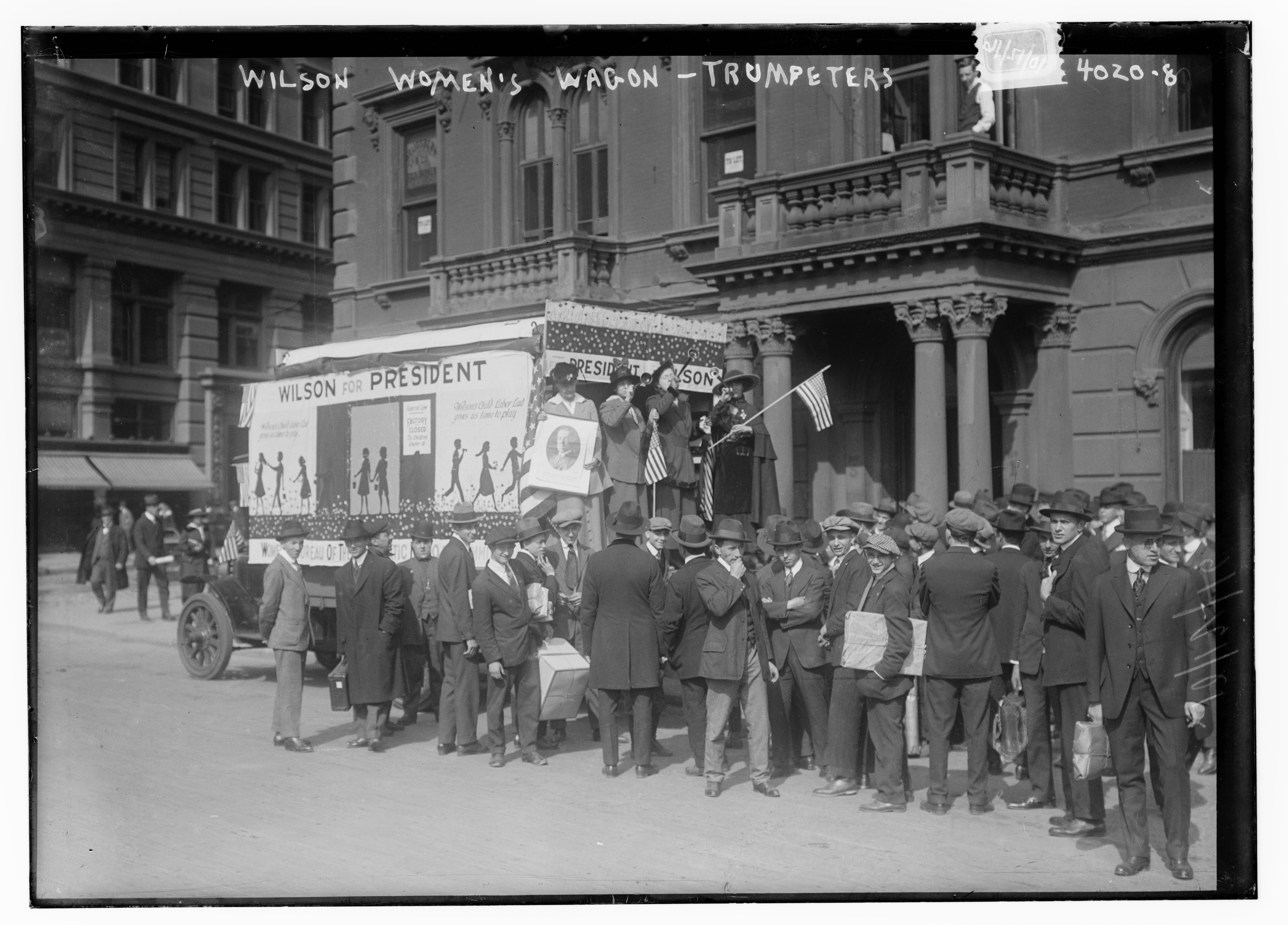
A Wilson campaign wagon

During the campaign, Edward M. House was Wilson's top campaign advisor. Hodgson says, "he planned its structure; set its tone; guided its finance; chose speakers, tactics, and strategy; and, not least, handled the campaign's greatest asset and greatest potential liability: its brilliant but temperamental candidate." The Democrats built their campaign around the slogan, "He Kept Us Out of War," saying a Republican victory would mean war with both Mexico and Germany. Wilson's position was probably critical in winning the Western states.

Charles Evans Hughes advocated greater mobilization and preparedness for war. With Wilson having successfully pressured the Germans to suspend unrestricted submarine warfare, it was difficult for Hughes to attack Wilson's peace platform.

Instead, Hughes criticized Wilson's military interventions in Mexico, where the U.S. was supporting various factions in the Mexican Revolution.

Hughes also attacked Wilson for his support of various "pro-labor" laws (such as limiting the workday to eight hours), on the grounds that they were harmful to business interests. His criticisms gained little traction, however, especially among factory workers who supported such laws. Hughes was helped by the vigorous support of popular former President Theodore Roosevelt, and by the fact that the Republicans were still the nation's majority party at the time.

Hughes made a key mistake in California. The 1912 split in Republican ranks remained a lingering issue, with two rival factions in California. Hughes decided to base his California campaign with the conservative Republican regulars instead of the Progressive faction. Hiram Johnson, the governor of California who had been Roosevelt's running mate in 1912, did endorse and speak for Hughes. However Johnson did not mobilize the Progressive faction and it saw Wilson as more of a true progressive. Wilson carried California by 3,773 votes (0.3%) and with it the Electoral College and the presidency.

=== Wilson's contingency plan had he lost ===
In the weeks prior to the election, Wilson began to worry that, were he to lose the race to Hughes, he would remain a lame duck until March 1917. For Wilson, this was problematic, given that the United States was likely on the eve of its entry into the First World War. Wilson, thus, privately floated a contingency plan: were Hughes to win, Wilson would immediately appoint Hughes secretary of state (a role which was, at the time, second-in-line to the presidency). Wilson and Vice President Marshall would both then resign, allowing Hughes to immediately become acting president, thereby avoiding a lengthy lame duck presidency. This plan was first revealed publicly two decades later in the memoirs of Robert Lansing, Wilson's secretary of state, who, under the plan, would have had to have resigned or been dismissed in order to allow Hughes to assume that office.

=== Results ===
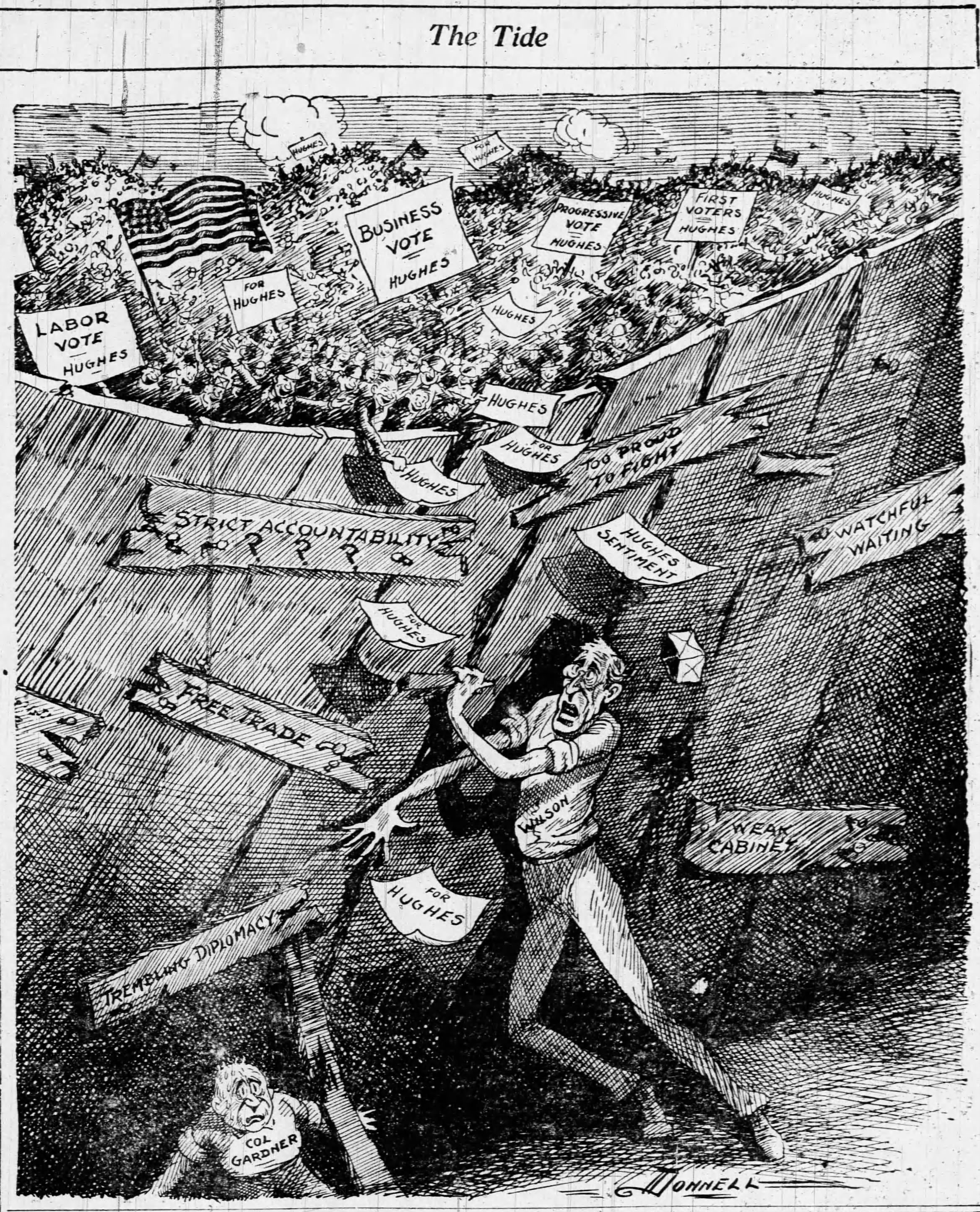
This cartoon published the day before the election in the St. Louis Globe-Democrat depicts the election's closeness

Turnout in the election was 61.8%, with 32.1% of the voting age population participating in the election. The result was exceptionally close and the outcome remained in doubt for some time. Some New York newspapers declared Hughes the winner on Wednesday morning, including The World and The Sun, which erroneously published that six states (California, Idaho, New Hampshire, North Dakota, Washington, and Wyoming) had voted for Hughes. The official gazette of the Kingdom of Serbia also declared him the winner on 16 November 1916.

A popular legend from the campaign states that Hughes went to bed on election night thinking that he was the newly elected president. When a reporter tried to telephone him the next morning to get his reaction to Wilson's comeback, someone (Note: Stories vary as to whether this person was his son, a butler, or a valet.) answered the phone and told the reporter that "the president is asleep." The reporter retorted, "When he wakes up, tell him he isn't the president."

By Wednesday evening, Wilson had secured 254 electoral votes in the counting, needing either California or Minnesota to claim victory. Democrats declared victory in California on Thursday afternoon, and the California Republican Party conceded defeat that night.

Wilson was the first Democratic president to win a second consecutive term since Andrew Jackson in 1832; his victory also marked the first time that Democrats had won two consecutive presidential elections since 1856. Vice-president Thomas R. Marshall also earned the distinction of becoming the first vice-president of any party elected to a second term since John C. Calhoun in 1828. As Calhoun had served as vice president under John Quincy Adams and was re-elected to serve under Andrew Jackson, Wilson and Marshall became the first incumbent ticket to win re-election since James Monroe and Daniel D. Tompkins in 1820.

The electoral vote was one of the closest in U.S. history – with 266 votes needed to win, Wilson took 30 states for 277 electoral votes, while Hughes won 18 states and 254 electoral votes. Wilson was the second of just four presidents in United States history to win re-election with a lower percentage of the electoral vote than in their prior elections, after James Madison in 1812, Franklin D. Roosevelt in 1940 and 1944 and Barack Obama in 2012.

Wilson's popular vote margin of 3.1 percent was the smallest attained by a victorious sitting president since 1812 and retained that status until 2004. This was the only election between 1896 and 1948 in which the national margin of victory was under 5 percentage points. The total popular vote cast in 1916 exceeded that of 1912 by 3,500,000. The large total vote was an indication of an aroused public interest in the campaign. It was larger in every section, notably in the East North Central section. Some of this was due to the extension of suffrage to women in individual states. In Illinois, for example, the total vote was one million greater than in 1912. It increased by more than 260,000 in Kansas, and in Montana, it more than doubled. Wilson's vote was 9,126,868, an increase of nearly 3,000,000. There was a gain in every section and in every state. Hughes, the nominee of the united Republican Party, polled more votes by nearly 1,000,000 than had ever been cast for a Republican candidate.

Among the third-party candidates, Benson's vote dropped to a little over half of what Eugene Debs had earned at the previous election, though this would still represent the best-ever showing of any Socialist candidate other than Debs. Hanly's performance would mark the last time the Prohibition Party exceeded one percent of the popular vote, with the party quickly declining into irrelevance after the passage of the Eighteenth Amendment in 1919.

To date, this is the last presidential election in which North Dakota and South Dakota did not vote for the same candidate, with the only others being 1896 and 1912. This is the last time Illinois voted for a losing candidate until 1976, the last time Minnesota voted for a losing candidate until 1968, and the last time West Virginia voted for a losing candidate until 1952. It was the only time a Democrat was elected without winning West Virginia from the state's founding until 2008. (Note: West Virginia's electors were voted on separately, and one of Wilson's, Orland Depue, managed to win.) This election was one of only four U.S. presidential elections, held since the Democrats and Republicans became the two major parties in U.S. politics, in which the winner did not carry any of the three Rust Belt states of Michigan, Pennsylvania, and Wisconsin; the others were 1884, 2000, and 2004. Hughes is the only Republican candidate between 1888 and 1932 who was never elected president.

This was the last election in which the Democrats won New Hampshire until 1936 and the last in which the Democrats won Arizona, California, Colorado, Idaho, Kansas, Maryland, Missouri, Montana, Nebraska, Nevada, New Mexico, North Dakota, Ohio, Utah, Washington, and Wyoming until 1932. This would also be one of four times in which the winning presidential candidate lost his home state, including 1844, 1968, and 2016. This election and the 1968 election are the only elections ever where the winning presidential and vice-presidential candidates lost each of their home states. Wilson was the last Democrat to win an election without carrying Minnesota, Massachusetts, and Rhode Island (although he had previously won the latter two states in 1912). This was the first time since 1856 that Democrats won consecutive elections. The eleven states of the former Confederacy provided 5.45% of Hughes' votes, with him taking 24.89% of the vote in that region. Wilson was also the last president to leave office after serving two full terms before the ratification of the 22nd Amendment in 1951, which established presidential term limits.

Electoral results
Presidential candidate	Party	Home state	Popular vote		Electoral vote	Running mate		
Presidential candidate	Party	Home state	Count	Percentage	Electoral vote	Vice-presidential candidate	Home state	Electoral vote
Woodrow Wilson (incumbent)	Democratic	New Jersey	9,126,868	49.24%	277	Thomas R. Marshall (incumbent)	Indiana	277
Charles Evans Hughes	Republican	New York	8,548,728	46.12%	254	Charles W. Fairbanks	Indiana	254
Allan L. Benson	Socialist	New York	590,524	3.19%	0	George Ross Kirkpatrick	New Jersey	0
Frank Hanly	Prohibition	Indiana	221,302	1.19%	0	Ira Landrith	Tennessee	0
None	Progressive	(n/a)	33,406	0.18%	0	John M. Parker	Louisiana	0
Arthur E. Reimer	Socialist Labor	Massachusetts	15,295	0.08%	0	Caleb Harrison	Illinois	0
Other			462	0.00%	—	Other		—
Total			18,536,585	100%	531			531
Needed to win					266			266

Source (Popular Vote): Leip, David. "1916 Presidential Election Results". Dave Leip's Atlas of U.S. Presidential Elections.

Source (Electoral Vote): "Electoral College Box Scores 1789–1996". National Archives and Records Administration.

Popular vote
Wilson	49.24%
Hughes	46.12%
Benson	3.19%
Hanly	1.19%
Others	0.27%

Electoral vote
Wilson	52.17%
Hughes	47.83%

Although there were numerous examples of election results being broadcast by radio stations in 1912, these stations had exclusively transmitted using Morse code. Taking advantage of recent advances in vacuum-tube transmitters, the 1916 election was the first to include audio radio returns, provided by the New York American in conjunction with the De Forest Radio Telephone and Telegraph company's experimental station 2XG. This broadcast was described by the newspaper as "For the first time the wireless telephone had been demonstrated as a practical, serviceable carrier of election news and comment."

=== Results by state ===
The key state proved to be California, which Wilson won by only 3,800 votes out of nearly a million cast. If Hughes had carried California and its 13 electoral votes, he would have won the election.

Although New Hampshire may not have been a deciding state in the election, the margin of victory for Wilson there was the second smallest ever recorded in an American presidential election at just 56 votes, behind Franklin Pierce's 25-vote victory in Delaware in 1852. (Note: Theodore Roosevelt won Maryland in 1904 by just fifty-one votes, but voters voted for individual presidential electors and only one Republican elector, Charles Bonaparte, survived the tally. Likewise, Henry Clay won Maryland by only four votes in 1832, but Maryland chose electors by district.)

In some of the states carried by Wilson, particularly in the South, the popular vote margin was large. Wilson ran behind Hughes in New England, the Mid-Atlantic states, and in the East North Central section. His lead was not great in the West North Central, but was very large in the West South Central and Mountain as well as in the East South Central and South Atlantic sections. Half of Wilson's total vote was cast in the 18 states that he did not carry.

States/districts won by Wilson/Marshall
States/districts won by Hughes/Fairbanks

		Woodrow Wilson Democratic			Charles Evans Hughes Republican			Allan Benson Socialist			James Hanly Prohibition			No Candidate Progressive "Bull Moose"			Arthur Reimer Socialist Labor			Margin		State Total	
State	electoral votes	#	%	electoral votes	#	%	electoral votes	#	%	electoral votes	#	%	electoral votes	#	%	electoral votes	#	%	electoral votes	#	%	#	
Alabama	12	99,409	76.04	12	28,662	21.92	-	1,916	1.47	-	741	0.57	-	-	-	-	-	-	-	70,747	54.12	130,728	AL
Arizona	3	33,170	57.17	3	20,524	35.37	-	3,174	5.47	-	1,153	1.99	-	-	-	-	-	-	-	12,646	21.80	58,021	AZ
Arkansas	9	112,211	65.97	9	48,879	28.73	-	6,999	4.11	-	2,015	1.18	-	-	-	-	-	-	-	63,332	37.23	170,104	AR
California	13	466,289	46.65	13	462,516	46.27	-	42,898	4.29	-	27,713	2.77	-	-	-	-	-	-	-	3,773	0.38	999,603	CA
Colorado	6	178,816	60.74	6	102,308	34.75	-	10,049	3.41	-	2,793	0.95	-	409	0.14	-	-	-	-	76,508	25.99	294,375	CO
Connecticut	7	99,786	46.66	-	106,514	49.80	7	5,179	2.42	-	1,789	0.84	-	-	-	-	606	0.28	-	-6,728	-3.15	213,874	CT
Delaware	3	24,753	47.78	-	26,011	50.20	3	480	0.93	-	566	1.09	-	-	-	-	-	-	-	-1,258	-2.43	51,810	DE
Florida	6	55,984	69.34	6	14,611	18.10	-	5,353	6.63	-	4,786	5.93	-	-	-	-	-	-	-	41,373	51.25	80,734	FL
Georgia	14	127,754	79.51	14	11,294	7.03	-	941	0.59	-	-	-	-	20,692	12.88	-	-	-	-	107,062	66.63	160,681	GA
Idaho	4	70,054	52.04	4	55,368	41.13	-	8,066	5.99	-	1,127	0.84	-	-	-	-	-	-	-	14,686	10.91	134,615	ID
Illinois	29	950,229	43.34	-	1,152,549	52.56	29	61,394	2.80	-	26,047	1.19	-	-	-	-	2,488	0.11	-	-202,320	-9.23	2,192,707	IL
Indiana	15	334,063	46.47	-	341,005	47.44	15	21,855	3.04	-	16,368	2.28	-	3,898	0.54	-	1,659	0.23	-	-6,942	-0.97	718,848	IN
Iowa	13	218,699	42.55	-	280,439	54.57	13	10,973	2.14	-	3,371	0.66	-	-	-	-	460	0.09	-	-61,740	-12.01	513,942	IA
Kansas	10	314,588	49.95	10	277,658	44.09	-	24,685	3.92	-	12,882	2.05	-	-	-	-	-	-	-	36,930	5.86	629,813	KS
Kentucky	13	269,990	51.91	13	241,854	46.50	-	4,734	0.91	-	3,039	0.58	-	129	0.02	-	332	0.06	-	28,136	5.41	520,078	KY
Louisiana	10	79,875	85.90	10	6,466	6.95	-	292	0.31	-	-	-	-	6,349	6.83	-	-	-	-	73,409	78.95	92,982	LA
Maine	6	64,033	46.97	-	69,508	50.99	6	2,177	1.60	-	596	0.44	-	-	-	-	-	-	-	-5,475	-4.02	136,314	ME
Maryland	8	138,359	52.80	8	117,347	44.78	-	2,674	1.02	-	2,903	1.11	-	-	-	-	756	0.29	-	21,012	8.02	262,039	MD
Massachusetts	18	247,885	46.61	-	268,784	50.54	18	11,058	2.08	-	2,993	0.56	-	-	-	-	1,097	0.21	-	-20,899	-3.93	531,823	MA
Michigan	15	286,775	44.05	-	339,097	52.09	15	16,120	2.48	-	8,139	1.25	-	-	-	-	842	0.13	-	-52,322	-8.04	650,973	MI
Minnesota	12	179,152	46.25	-	179,544	46.35	12	20,117	5.19	-	7,793	2.01	-	290	0.07	-	468	0.12	-	-392	-0.10	387,364	MN
Mississippi	10	80,422	92.78	10	4,253	4.91	-	1,484	1.71	-	-	-	-	520	0.60	-	-	-	-	76,169	87.87	86,679	MS
Missouri	18	398,032	50.59	18	369,339	46.94	-	14,612	1.86	-	3,884	0.49	-	-	-	-	902	0.11	-	28,693	3.65	786,769	MO
Montana	4	101,063	56.88	4	66,750	37.57	-	9,564	5.38	-	-	-	-	302	0.17	-	-	-	-	34,313	19.31	177,679	MT
Nebraska	8	158,827	55.28	8	117,771	40.99	-	7,141	2.49	-	2,952	1.03	-	-	-	-	624	0.22	-	41,056	14.29	287,315	NE
Nevada	3	17,776	53.36	3	12,127	36.40	-	3,065	9.20	-	348	1.04	-	-	-	-	-	-	-	5,649	16.96	33,316	NV
New Hampshire	4	43,781	49.12	4	43,725	49.06	-	1,318	1.48	-	303	0.34	-	-	-	-	-	-	-	56	0.06	89,127	NH
New Jersey	14	211,018	42.68	-	268,982	54.40	14	10,405	2.10	-	3,182	0.64	-	-	-	-	855	0.17	-	-57,964	-11.72	494,442	NJ
New Mexico	3	33,527	50.20	3	31,152	46.64	-	1,996	2.99	-	112	0.17	-	-	-	-	-	-	-	2,375	3.56	66,787	NM
New York	45	759,426	44.51	-	879,238	51.53	45	45,944	2.69	-	19,031	1.12	-	-	-	-	2,666	0.16	-	-119,812	-7.02	1,706,305	NY
North Carolina	12	168,383	58.10	12	120,890	41.71	-	509	0.18	-	55	0.02	-	-	-	-	-	-	-	47,493	16.39	289,837	NC
North Dakota	5	55,206	47.84	5	53,471	46.34	-	5,716	4.95	-	997	0.86	-	-	-	-	-	-	-	1,735	1.50	115,390	ND
Ohio	24	604,161	51.86	24	514,753	44.18	-	38,092	3.27	-	8,080	0.69	-	-	-	-	-	-	-	89,408	7.67	1,165,086	OH
Oklahoma	10	148,113	50.59	10	97,233	33.21	-	45,527	15.55	-	1,646	0.56	-	234	0.08	-	-	-	-	50,880	17.38	292,753	OK
Oregon	5	120,087	45.90	-	126,813	48.47	5	9,711	3.71	-	4,729	1.81	-	310	0.12	-	-	-	-	-6,726	-2.57	261,650	OR
Pennsylvania	38	521,784	40.22	-	703,823	54.26	38	42,638	3.29	-	28,525	2.20	-	-	-	-	419	0.03	-	-182,039	-14.03	1,297,189	PA
Rhode Island	5	40,394	46.00	-	44,858	51.08	5	1,914	2.18	-	470	0.54	-	-	-	-	180	0.20	-	-4,464	-5.08	87,816	RI
South Carolina	9	61,846	96.71	9	1,550	2.42	-	135	0.21	-	-	-	-	162	0.25	-	-	-	-	60,296	94.28	63,952	SC
South Dakota	5	59,191	45.91	-	64,217	49.80	5	3,760	2.92	-	1,774	1.38	-	-	-	-	-	-	-	-5,026	-3.90	128,942	SD
Tennessee	12	153,280	56.31	12	116,223	42.70	-	2,542	0.93	-	145	0.05	-	-	-	-	-	-	-	37,057	13.61	272,190	TN
Texas	20	286,514	76.92	20	64,999	17.45	-	18,969	5.09	-	1,985	0.53	-	-	-	-	-	-	-	221,515	59.47	372,467	TX
Utah	4	84,145	58.78	4	54,137	37.82	-	4,460	3.12	-	149	0.10	-	111	0.08	-	144	0.10	-	30,008	20.96	143,146	UT
Vermont	4	22,708	35.22	-	40,250	62.43	4	798	1.24	-	709	1.10	-	-	-	-	-	-	-	-17,542	-27.21	64,475	VT
Virginia	12	101,840	66.99	12	48,384	31.83	-	1,056	0.69	-	678	0.45	-	-	-	-	67	0.04	-	53,456	35.16	152,025	VA
Washington	7	183,388	48.13	7	167,208	43.89	-	22,800	5.98	-	6,868	1.80	-	-	-	-	730	0.19	-	16,180	4.25	380,994	WA
West Virginia	8	140,403	48.44	1	143,124	49.38	7	6,150	2.12	-	175	0.06	-	-	-	-	-	-	-	-2,721	-0.94	289,852	WV
Wisconsin	13	191,363	42.80	-	220,822	49.39	13	27,631	6.18	-	7,318	1.64	-	-	-	-	-	-	-	-29,459	-6.59	447,134	WI
Wyoming	3	28,316	54.62	3	21,698	41.86	-	1,453	2.80	-	373	0.72	-	-	-	-	-	-	-	6,618	12.77	51,840	WY
TOTALS:	531	9,126,868	49.24	277	8,548,728	46.12	254	590,524	3.19	-	221,302	1.19	-	33,406	0.18	-	15,295	0.08	-	578,140	3.12	18,536,585	US

=== States that flipped from Democratic to Republican ===
- Connecticut
- Delaware
- Illinois
- Indiana
- Iowa
- Maine
- Massachusetts
- New Jersey
- New York
- Oregon
- Rhode Island
- Wisconsin
- West Virginia

=== States that flipped from Republican to Democratic ===
- Utah

=== States that flipped from Progressive to Republican ===
- Michigan
- Minnesota
- Pennsylvania
- South Dakota

=== States that flipped from Progressive to Democratic ===
- California
- Washington

=== Close states ===
Margin of victory of less than 1% (52 electoral votes):

1. New Hampshire, 0.06% (56 votes)
2. Minnesota, 0.10% (392 votes)
3. California, 0.38% (3,773 votes) (tipping point state)
4. West Virginia, 0.94% (2,721 votes)
5. Indiana, 0.97% (6,942 votes)

Margin of victory of less than 5% (77 electoral votes):

1. North Dakota, 1.50% (1,735 votes)
2. Delaware, 2.43% (1,258 votes)
3. Oregon, 2.57% (6,726 votes)
4. Connecticut, 3.15% (6,728 votes)
5. New Mexico, 3.56% (2,375 votes)
6. Missouri, 3.65% (28,693 votes)
7. South Dakota, 3.90% (5,026 votes)
8. Massachusetts, 3.93% (20,899 votes)
9. Maine, 4.02% (5,475 votes)
10. Washington, 4.25% (16,180 votes)

Margin of victory of between 5% and 10% (162 electoral votes):

1. Rhode Island, 5.08% (4,464 votes)
2. Kentucky, 5.41% (28,136 votes)
3. Kansas, 5.86% (36,930 votes)
4. Wisconsin, 6.59% (29,459 votes)
5. New York, 7.02% (119,812 votes)
6. Ohio, 7.67% (89,408 votes)
7. Maryland, 8.02% (21,012 votes)
8. Michigan, 8.04% (52,322 votes)
9. Illinois, 9.23% (202,320 votes)

=== Results by county ===
Of the 3,022 counties making returns, Wilson led in 2,039 counties (67.47%). Hughes managed to carry only 976 counties (32.30%), the smallest number in the Republican column in a two-party contest during the Fourth Party System. Two counties (0.07%) split evenly between Wilson and Hughes. Although the Progressive Party had no presidential candidate (just candidates for presidential electors who were unpledged for president), they carried five counties (0.17%), whilst nine counties – 0.30 percent and the same as in 1912 – inhabited either by Native Americans without citizenship or disenfranchised African Americans failed to return a single vote. Wilson carried 200 counties that had never voted Democratic in a two-party contest prior to that time.

Counties with Highest Percent of Vote (Democratic)

1. Dillon County, South Carolina 100.00%
2. Hampton County, South Carolina 100.00%
3. Jasper County, South Carolina 100.00%
4. Tunica County, Mississippi 100.00%
5. Echols County, Georgia 100.00%

Counties with Highest Percent of Vote (Republican)

1. Leslie County, Kentucky 91.55%
2. Sevier County, Tennessee 90.42%
3. Zapata County, Texas 89.17%
4. Jackson County, Kentucky 87.90%
5. Johnson County, Tennessee 87.33%

Counties with Highest Percent of Vote (Other)

1. Lafourche Parish, Louisiana 59.38%
2. Glascock County, Georgia 53.79%
3. Paulding County, Georgia 53.52%
4. Fannin County, Georgia 51.29%
5. Iberia Parish, Louisiana 47.59%

=== Maps ===
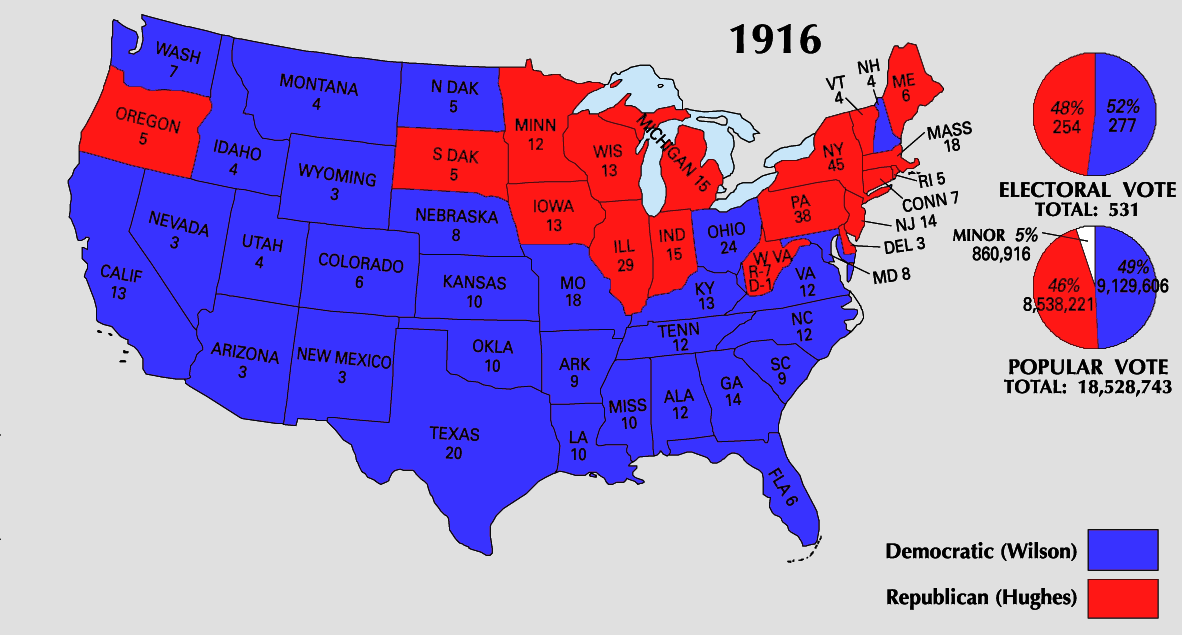
Results by state

Results by county, shaded according to winning candidate's percentage of the vote

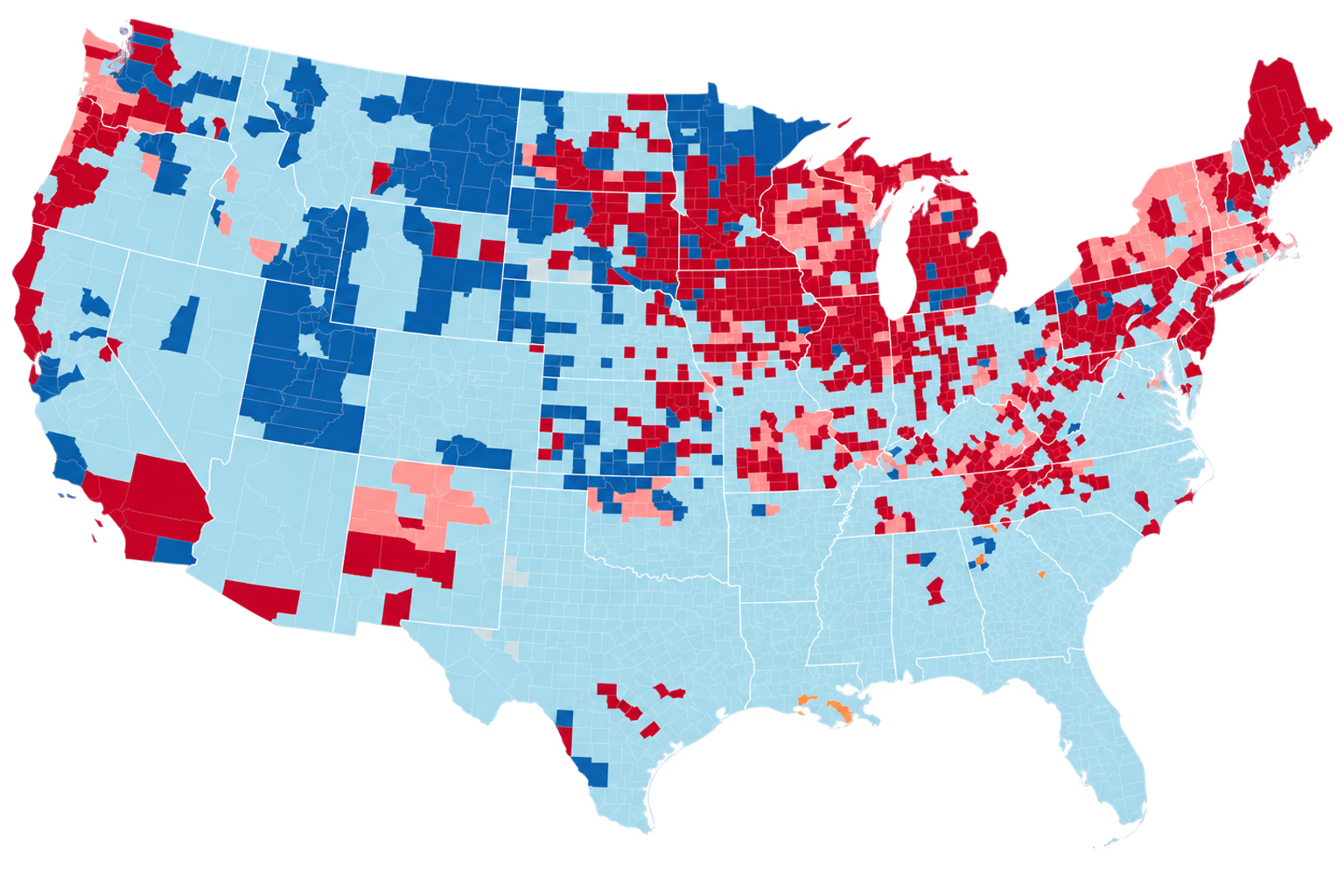
1912-16 county flips, with dark colors denoting flips and light indicating holds.

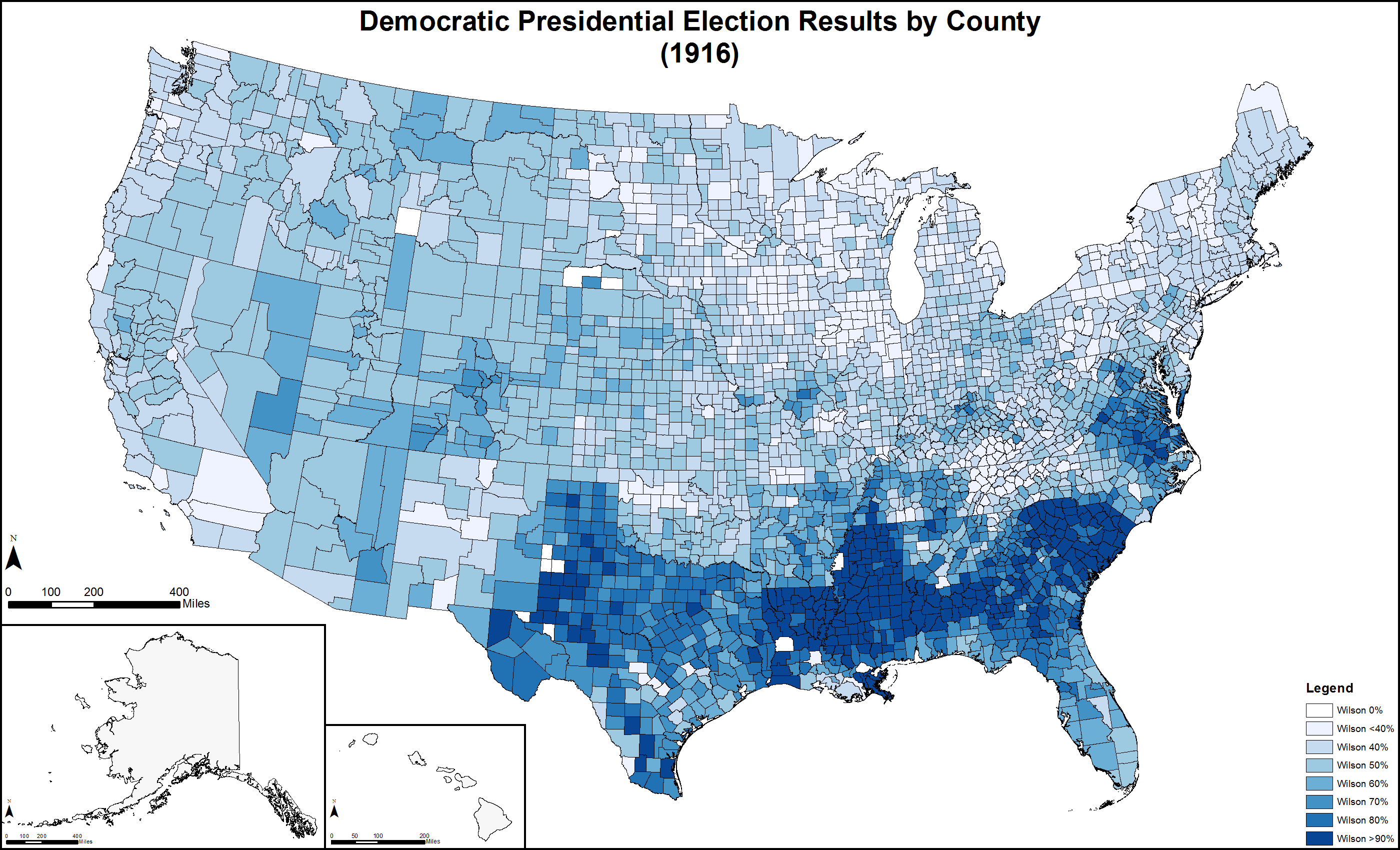
Results by county, shaded according to percentage of the vote for Wilson

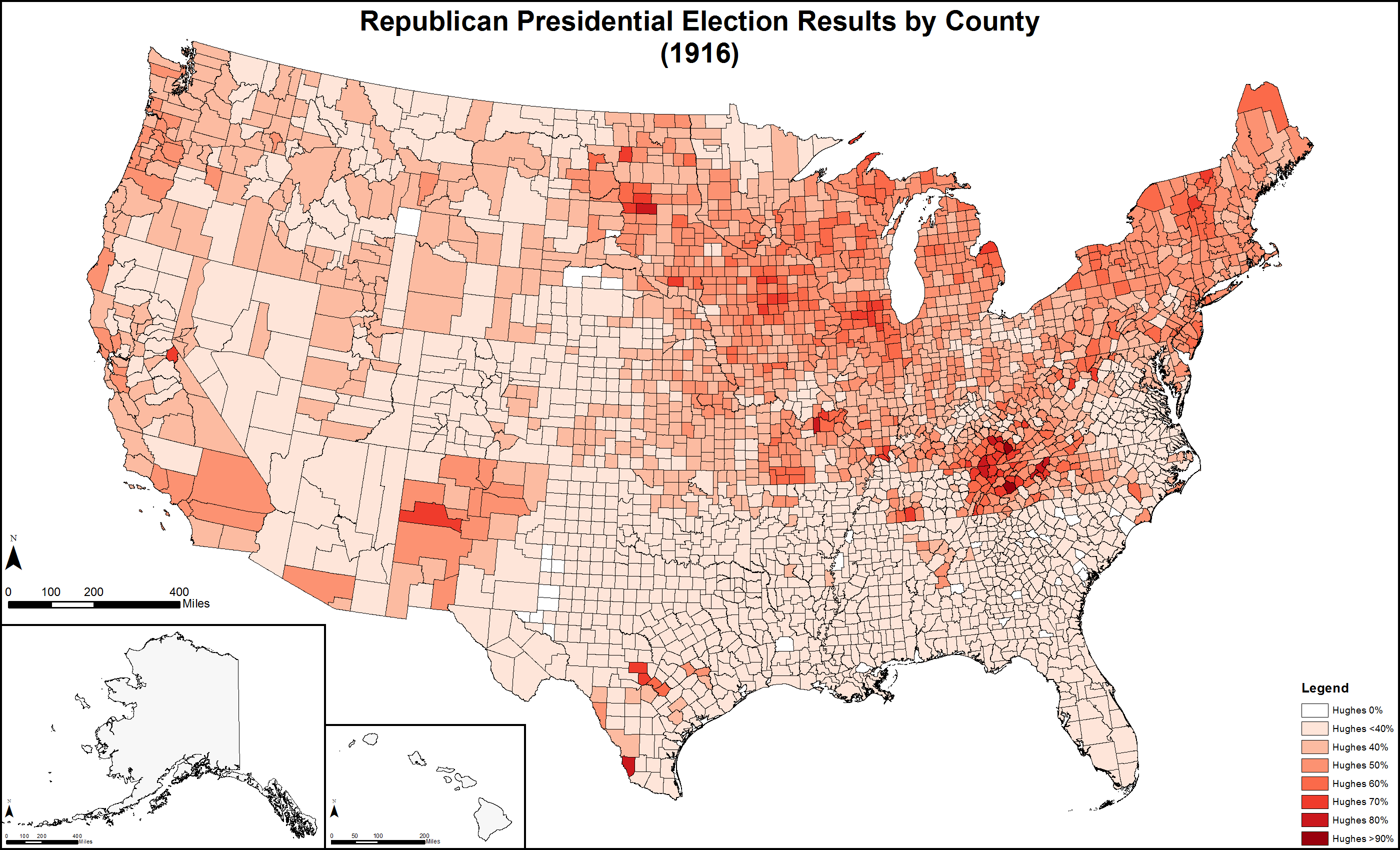
Results by county, shaded according to percentage of the vote for Hughes

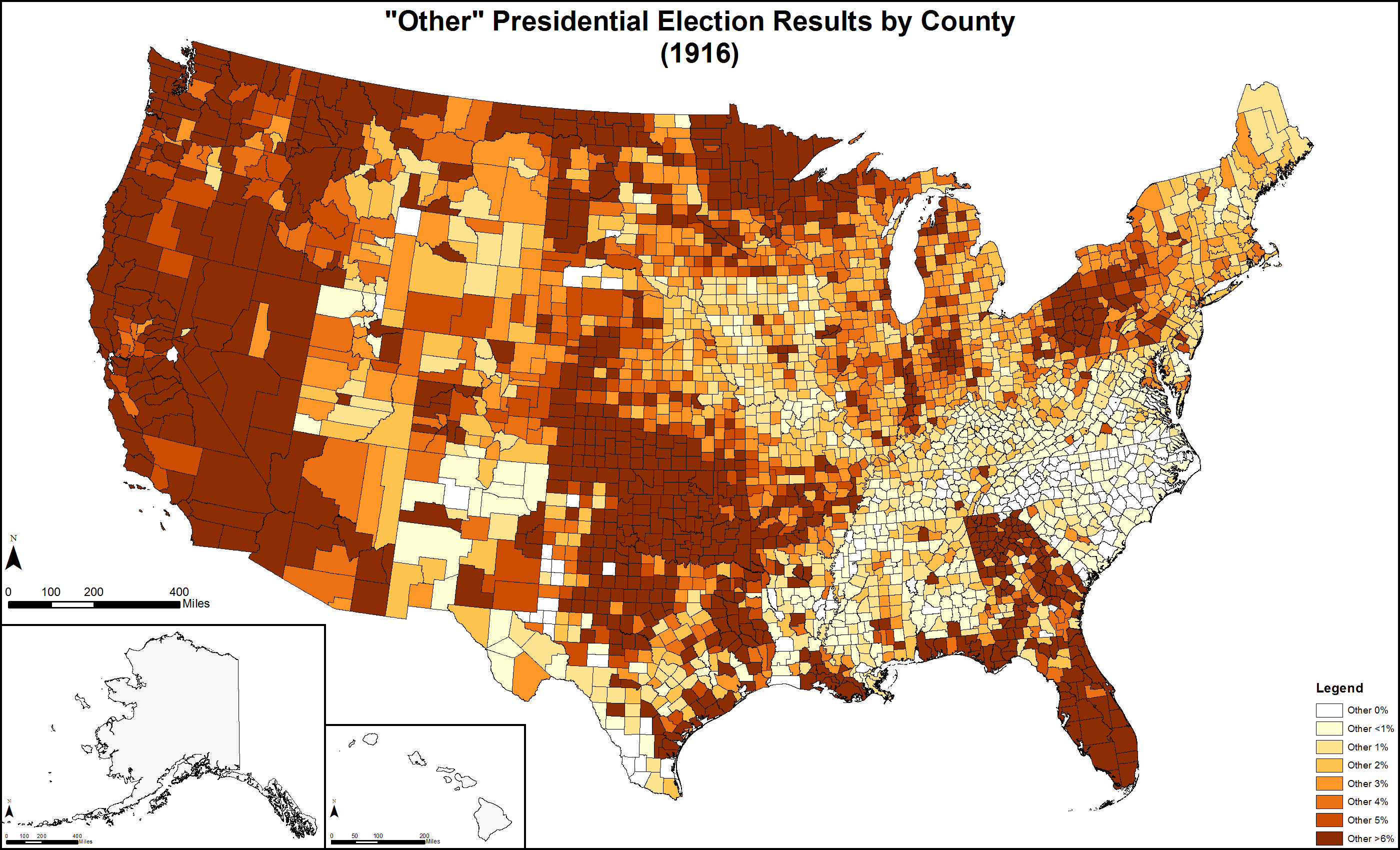
Results by county, shaded according to percentage of the vote for all others

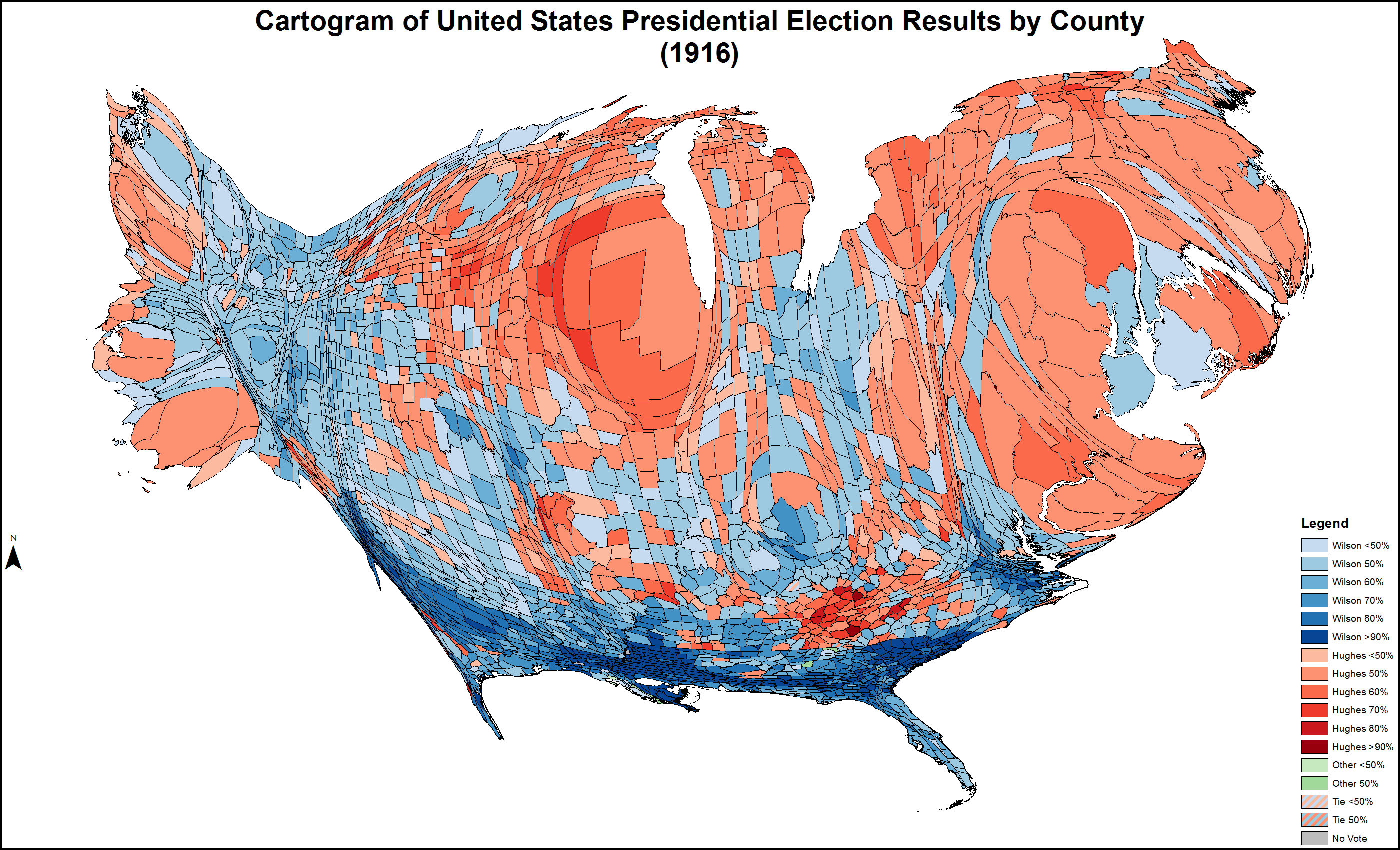
A continuous cartogram of the 1916 United States presidential election

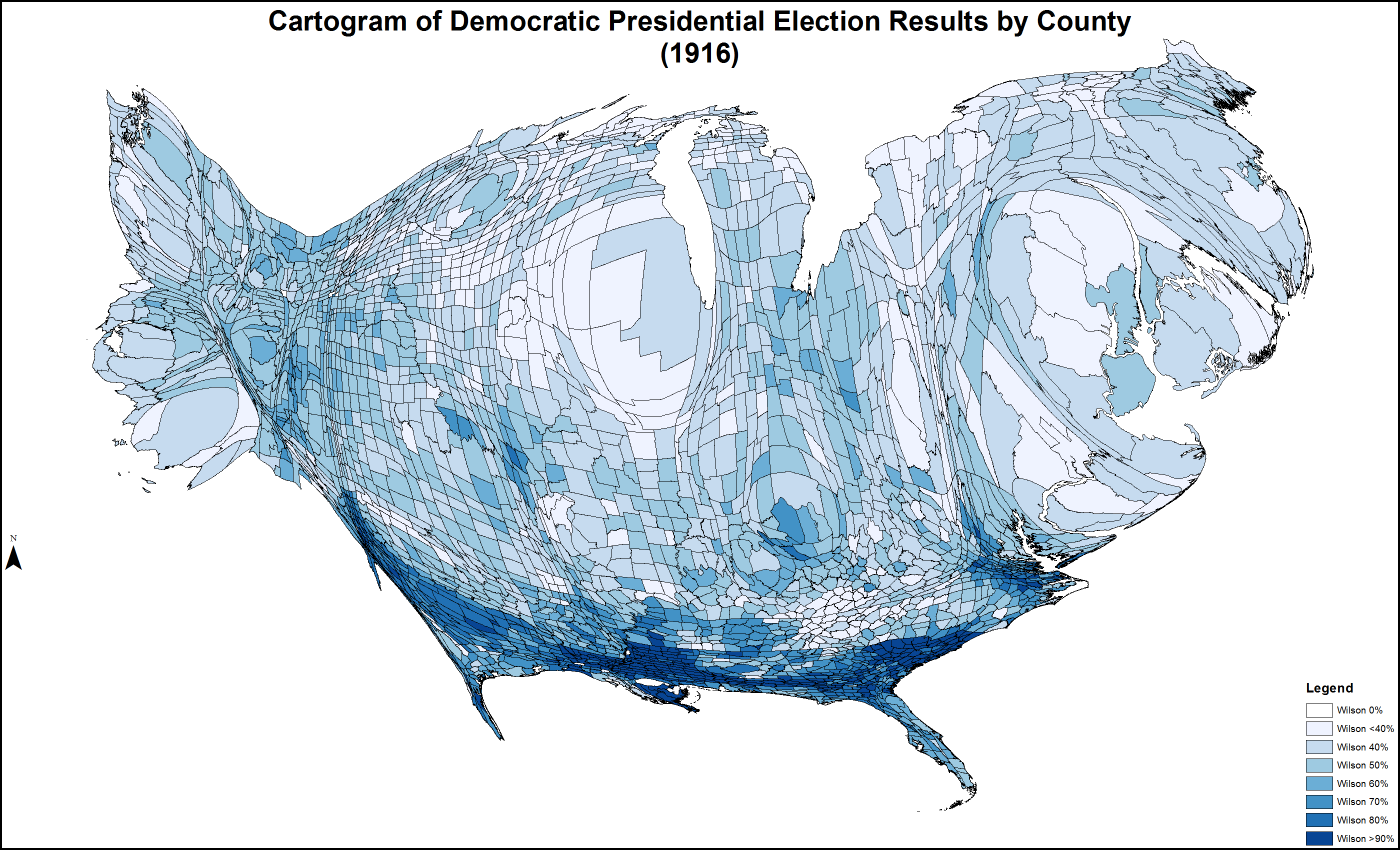
Cartogram shaded according to percentage of the vote for Wilson

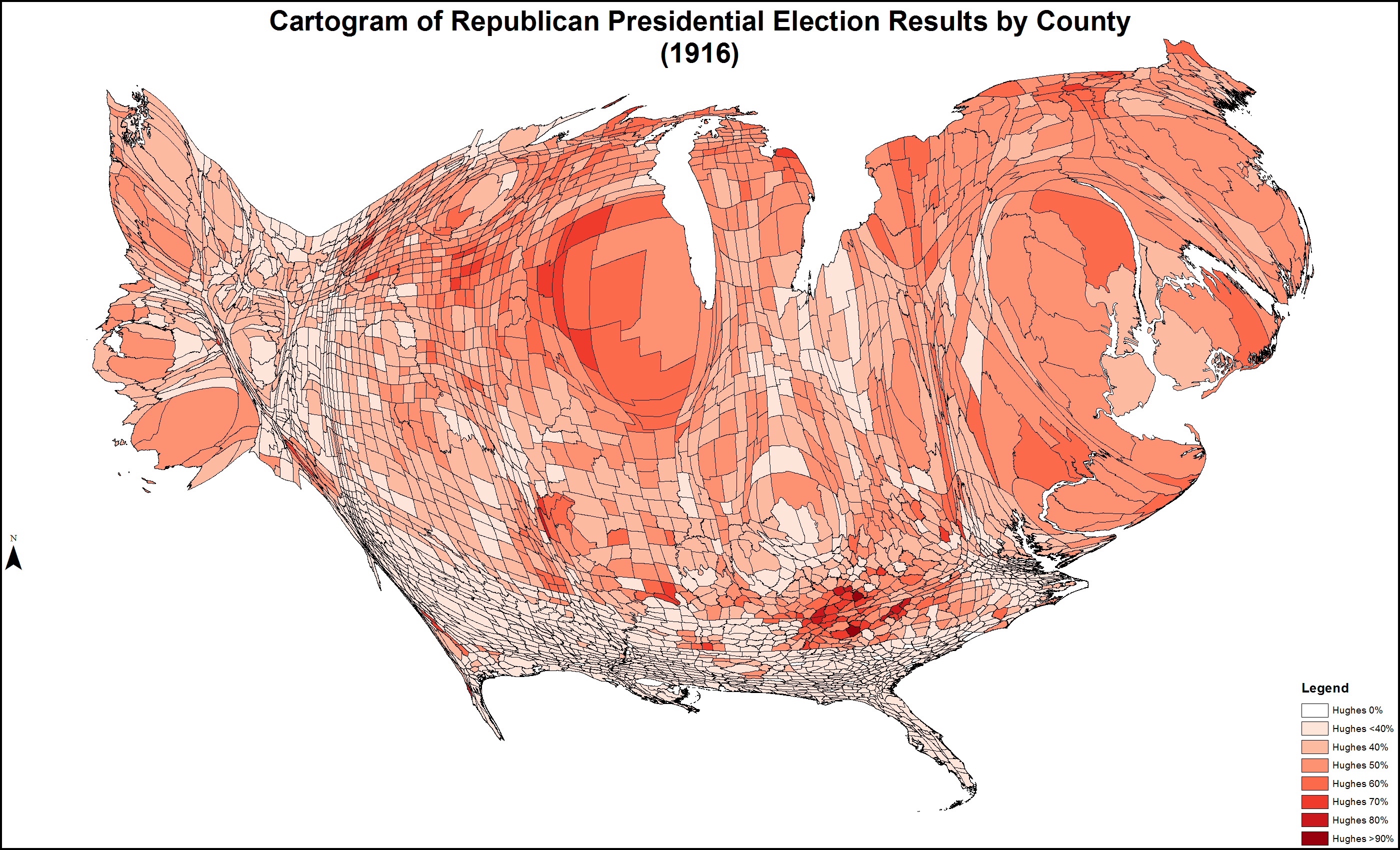
Cartogram shaded according to percentage of the vote for Hughes

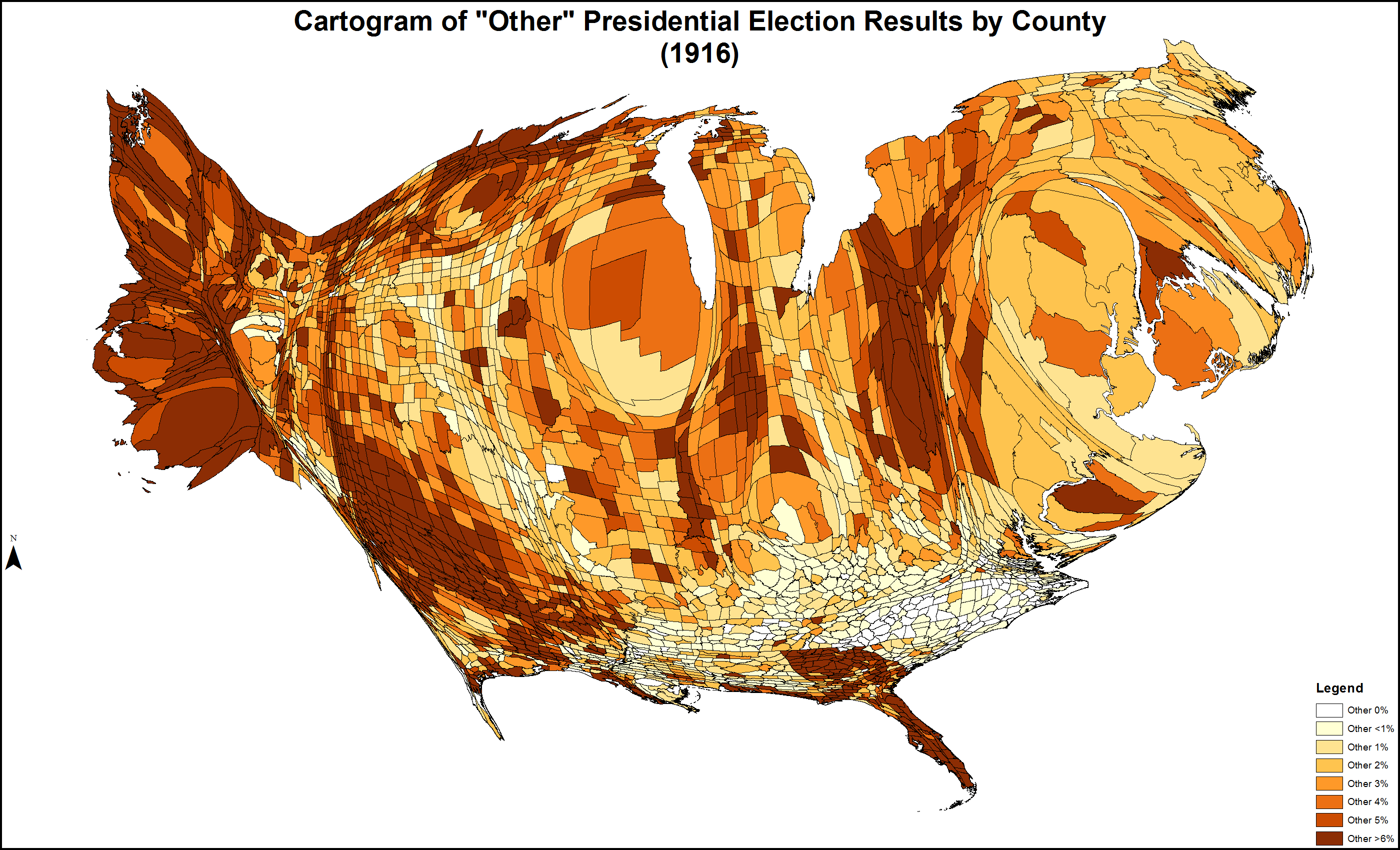
Cartogram shaded according to percentage of the vote for all others

State Level Performance for Allan L. Benson Presidential Campaign, 1916 (Socialist Party)

== Aftermath ==
The gains made by Wilson in this election were a novel phenomenon under the Fourth Party System. This shift of votes led some to believe that the Democratic Party might have the position of decided advantage in the election of 1920.

== See also ==
- History of the United States (1865-1918)
- 1916 United States House of Representatives elections
- 1916 United States Senate elections
- Contested elections in American history

== Bibliography ==
- "Election of 1916," in Arthur M. Schlesinger, Jr. ed. Coming to Power: Critical Presidential Elections in American History (1972) pp. 296–321. online
- Abramson, Paul; Aldrich, John; Rohde, David (1995). Change and Continuity in the 1992 Elections. CQ Press. ISBN 0871878399.
- Bates, J. Leonard, and Vanette M. Schwartz. "Golden Special Campaign Train: Republican Women Campaign for Charles Evans Hughes for President in 1916." Montana: The Magazine of Western History (1987): 26–35. online
- Beatson, James Allen. "The Election the West Decided: 1916." Arizona and the West 3.1 (1961): 39–58. online
- Berman, David R. Radicalism in the Mountain West, 1890-1920: Socialists, Populists, Miners, and Wobblies (University Press of Colorado, 2007).
- Burchell, R. A. "Did the Irish and German Voters Desert the Democrats in 1920? A Tentative Statistical Answer" Journal of American Studies 5#2 (1972) pp. 153–164 online
- Cooper, John Milton Jr. Woodrow Wilson (2009), ch 16.
- Davies, Gareth, and Julian E. Zelizer, eds. America at the Ballot Box: Elections and Political History (2015) pp. 118–38.
- Gould, Lewis L. (2016). The First Modern Clash Over Federal Power: Wilson Versus Hughes in the Presidential Election of 1916. Lawrence, KS, USA: University Press of Kansas. ISBN 978-0-7006-2280-1. online
- Leary, William M. Jr. (1967). "Woodrow Wilson, Irish Americans, and the Election of 1916". The Journal of American History. 54 (1): 57–72. doi:10.2307/1900319. JSTOR 1900319.
- Link, Arthur Stanley (1954). Woodrow Wilson and the Progressive Era, 1910–1917. New York: Harper. ISBN 978-0-06-012650-6.
- Link, Arthur Stanley (1965). Wilson: Campaigns For Progressivism and Peace 1916–1917. Princeton: Princeton University Press. ISBN 978-1-59740-283-5.
- Lovell, S. D. (1980). The Presidential Election of 1916. Carbondale: Southern Illinois University Press. ISBN 978-0-8093-0965-8.
- Miller, Sally M. "The Socialist Party and the Negro, 1901–20," Journal of Negro History 56 (July 1971): 220–229. online
- Oks, David. "The Election of 1916, 'Negrowumpism,' and the Black Defection from the Republican Party." Journal of the Gilded Age and Progressive Era 20.4 (2021): 523–547. online
- Olin, Spencer C. "Hiram Johnson, the California Progressives, and the Hughes Campaign of 1916." Pacific Historical Review 31.4 (1962): 403–412. online
- Phelps, Nicole M. "The Election of 1916." in A Companion to Woodrow Wilson ed, by Ross A. Kennedy, (2013): 173+ online.
- Pietrusza, David (2018). TR's Last War: Theodore Roosevelt, the Great War, and a Journey of Triumph and Tragedy. Guilford (CT): Lyons Press. ISBN 978-1-4930-2887-0.; popular history
- Pusey, Merlo J. (1951). Charles Evans Hughes. Vol. 1. New York: Macmillan. volume 1 ch 31–34
- Roberts, George C. "Woodrow Wilson, John W. Kern and the 1916 Indiana Election: Defeat of a Senate Majority Leader." presidential Studies Quarterly 10, no. 1 (1980): 63–73.
- Rogin, Michael. "Progressivism and the California electorate." Journal of American History 55.2 (1968): 297–314. online
- Sarasohn, David. "The Election of 1916: Realigning the Rockies." Western Historical Quarterly 11.3 (1980): 285–305. online
- Sherman, Richard (1973). The Republican Party and Black America From McKinley to Hoover 1896-1933. University of Virginia Press. ISBN 0813904676.

=== Primary sources ===
- Chester, Edward W A guide to political platforms (1977) online
- Porter, Kirk H. and Donald Bruce Johnson, eds. National party platforms, 1840-1964 (1965) online 1840-1956
