= John M. Parker =

American politician

John Milliken Parker Sr.
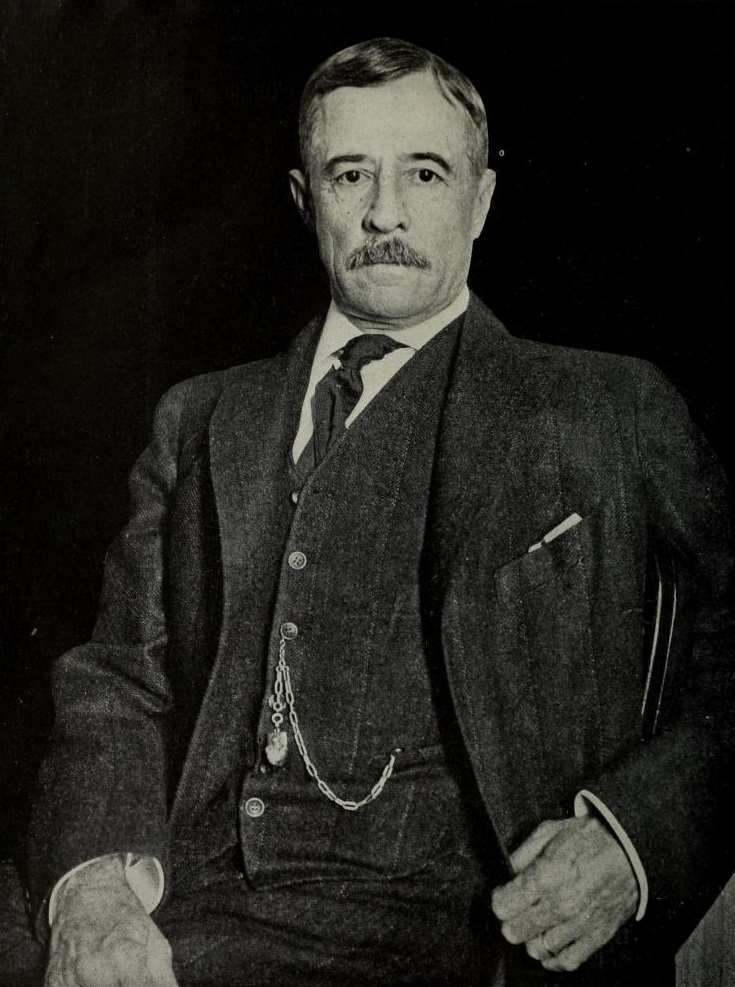
- Parker c. 1920

37th Governor of Louisiana
- In office May 11, 1920 – May 13, 1924
- Lieutenant: Hewitt Bouanchaud; Delos R. Johnson
- Preceded by: Ruffin G. Pleasant
- Succeeded by: Henry L. Fuqua

Personal details
- Born: John Milliken Parker; March 16, 1863 Washington, Mississippi, U.S.
- Died: May 20, 1939 (aged 76) Pass Christian, Mississippi, U.S.
- Resting place: Metairie Cemetery
- Party: Progressive (1912–1916); Democratic (1916–1939)
- Spouse: Cecile Airey Parker
- Education: Eastman Business College
- Occupation: Businessman

John Milliken Parker Sr. (March 16, 1863 – May 20, 1939), was an American Democratic politician from Louisiana, who served as the state's 37th governor from 1920 to 1924. He was a friend and admirer of U.S. President Theodore Roosevelt. He participated in the 1891 New Orleans lynchings.

== Early years ==
Parker was born in Bethel Church, Mississippi to John Milliken Parker and Roberta Buckner, wealthy parents whose families each owned substantial plantation lands in that state. He was educated at the historic prep school Chamberlain-Hunt Academy in Port Gibson, Mississippi, Belle View Academy in Virginia, and Eastman Business College in Poughkeepsie, New York. A prominent businessman, he was the president of the New Orleans Cotton Exchange and the Board of Trade.

In 1891, Parker participated in the mob that lynched eleven Italian immigrants in New Orleans, in reaction to the murder of Police Chief David C. Hennessy. He refused to apologize for his role because he believed the mass lynching was justified.

== Early political career ==
Parker first ran for Governor of Louisiana in 1916 as the nominee of the Progressive Party, running against state Attorney General Ruffin G. Pleasant, the Democratic nominee. Though Parker was ultimately defeated in a landslide, winning just 38% of the vote, the election was the closest gubernatorial election since 1896. Following his defeat, Parker was nominated by the Progressive Party for vice-president in 1916, but Roosevelt declined the Party's nomination for president and instead endorsed the Republican nominee, Charles Evans Hughes. Though the Party had no presidential nominee, and Parker endorsed President Woodrow Wilson for re-election, Parker remained on the ballot as the Progressive nominee for vice-president in a handful of states, including Louisiana. Though the ticket won just 7% of the vote in Louisiana, Parker won Iberia and Lafourche parishes in southern Louisiana.

In the aftermath of both losses, Parker was seen as a likely candidate for Governor in 1920. Parker formally left the Progressive Party in 1916 and registered as a Democrat. Frank P. Stubbs, a businessman and colonel in the Louisiana National Guard, emerged as his chief opponent for the Democratic nomination. Stubbs secured the support of the Democratic Party's old guard establishment, while Parker was supported by New Orleans good government reformers, Governor Pleasant, and former Governor Jared Y. Sanders. Parker ended up narrowly defeating Stubbs in the Democratic primary, 54-45%, and won the general election with 98% of the vote.

== Parker's record as governor ==
Prior to the term of Parker the state had no continuous paved roads east to west or north to south crossing the entire state. In 1922, he sent the Federal Bureau of Investigation a message begging for help in fighting the Ku Klux Klan, which had grown so powerful in Louisiana that it not only controlled the northern half of the state but had kidnapped, tortured, and killed two people who opposed it. A law providing for free employment bureaus was also passed during Parker's time as governor.

== Post-gubernatorial years ==
After his gubernatorial term ended, Parker devoted himself to managing an experimental farm on his property at Bayou Sara near St. Francisville in West Feliciana Parish. In June 1929, he was named president of the 300-member strong "Constitutional League of Louisiana", which was organized at the St. Charles Hotel in New Orleans to "save the state from Huey Long"; State Senator Norris C. Williamson of East Carroll Parish was appointed as vice-president.

Parker died in 1939 at the age of seventy-six in Pass Christian, Mississippi, east of New Orleans. He is interred at Metairie Cemetery in New Orleans.

The 12,000-seat John M. Parker Agricultural Coliseum on the LSU campus is named in his honor.

== World War I ==
Roosevelt selected Parker as one of eighteen officers (others included Seth Bullock, Frederick Russell Burnham, and James Rudolph Garfield) to raise a volunteer infantry division, Roosevelt's World War I volunteers, for service in France in 1917. The U.S. Congress gave Roosevelt the authority to raise up to four divisions similar to the Rough Riders of the 1st United States Volunteer Cavalry Regiment and to the British Army 25th (Frontiersmen) Battalion, Royal Fusiliers; however, as commander-in-chief, U.S. President Woodrow Wilson refused to make use of the volunteers, and the unit hence disbanded.

== Sources ==
- Greaves Cowan, Walter; McGuire, Jack B. (2008). "John M. Parker (1920-1924)". Louisiana Governors: Rulers, Rascals, Reformers. Jackson, Miss.: University Press of Mississippi. pp. 149–57. ISBN 978-1-934110-90-4.
- Carter, Hodding (1968). The Past as Prelude: New Orleans, 1718-1968. New Orleans, La.: Pelican Publishing Company, Inc. ISBN 9781455610143.

== Notes ==
- Political Graveyard
- State of Louisiana – Biography

Party political offices
Preceded by None	Progressive nominee for Governor of Louisiana; 1916	Succeeded by None
Preceded by Ruffin G. Pleasant	Democratic nominee for Governor of Louisiana; 1920	Succeeded by Henry L. Fuqua
Political offices
Preceded by Ruffin G. Pleasant	Governor of Louisiana; May 11, 1920–May 13, 1924	Succeeded by Henry L. Fuqua
