= 1916 Louisiana gubernatorial election =

- April 18, 1916
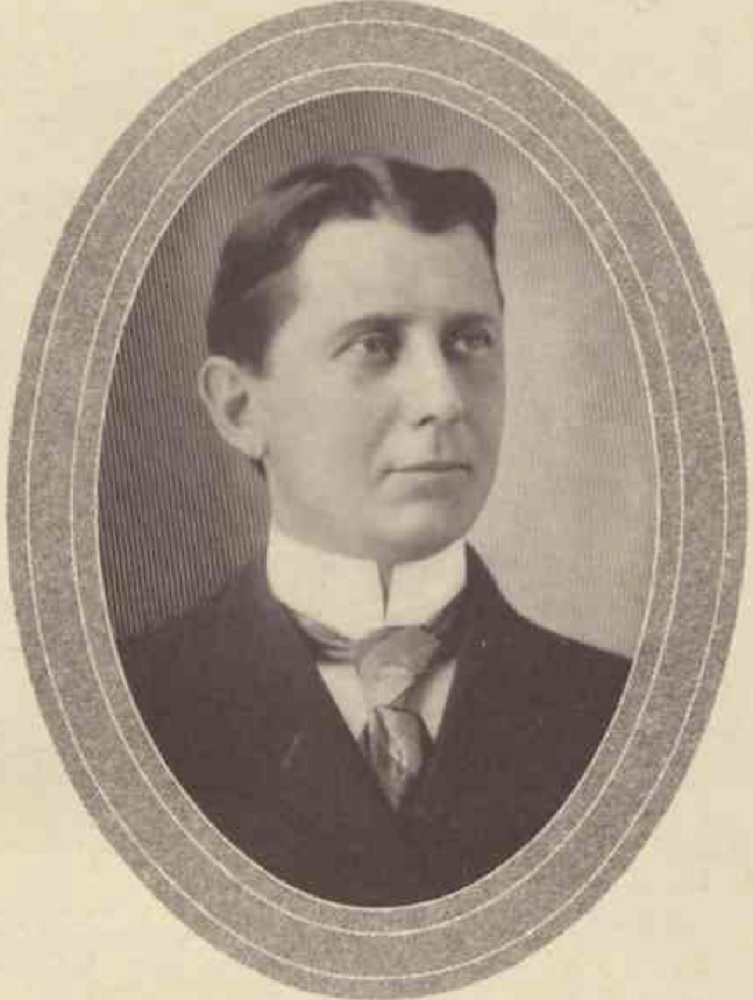

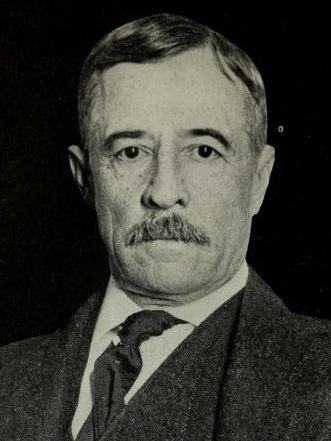
Nominee	Ruffin G. Pleasant	John M. Parker
Party	Democratic	Progressive
Popular vote	80,807	48,085
Percentage	62.51%	37.50%
- Parish results Blanchard: 50–60% 60–70% 70–80% 80–90% >90% Parker: 50–60% 60–70% 70–80%
Governor before election
Luther E. Hall
Democratic
Elected Governor
Ruffin G. Pleasant
Democratic

The 1916 Louisiana gubernatorial election was held on April 18, 1916. As in most Southern states between the Reconstruction Era and the Civil Rights Movement, Louisiana's Republican Party was virtually nonexistent in terms of electoral support. This meant that the Democratic Party primary held on January 25 was supposed to be the real contest over who would be governor. However, in this particular election, Progressive Party nominee John M. Parker ran an unusually competitive campaign, garnering 37% of the general election vote. The election resulted in the election of Democrat Ruffin G. Pleasant as governor of Louisiana.

== Democratic primary ==
=== Candidates ===
- Thomas C. Barret, lieutenant governor of Louisiana
- Ruffin G. Pleasant, attorney general of Louisiana

Democratic Party primary, January 25

Candidate	Votes received	Percent
Ruffin G. Pleasant	84,407	73.71%
Thomas C. Barret	30,112	26.29%

== General election ==
=== Candidates ===
- Horace Noonan (Independent)
- John M. Parker, president of the New Orleans Cotton Exchange (Progressive)
- Ruffin G. Pleasant, attorney general of Louisiana (Democratic)

General election, April 18

Party	Candidate	Votes received	Percent
Democratic	Ruffin G. Pleasant	80,807	62.51%
Progressive	John M. Parker	48,085	37.20%
Independent	Horace Noonan	357	0.28%

Preceded by 1912 gubernatorial election	Louisiana gubernatorial elections	Succeeded by 1920 gubernatorial election
