= Ruffin G. Pleasant =

American politician (1871–1937)

Ruffin Pleasant
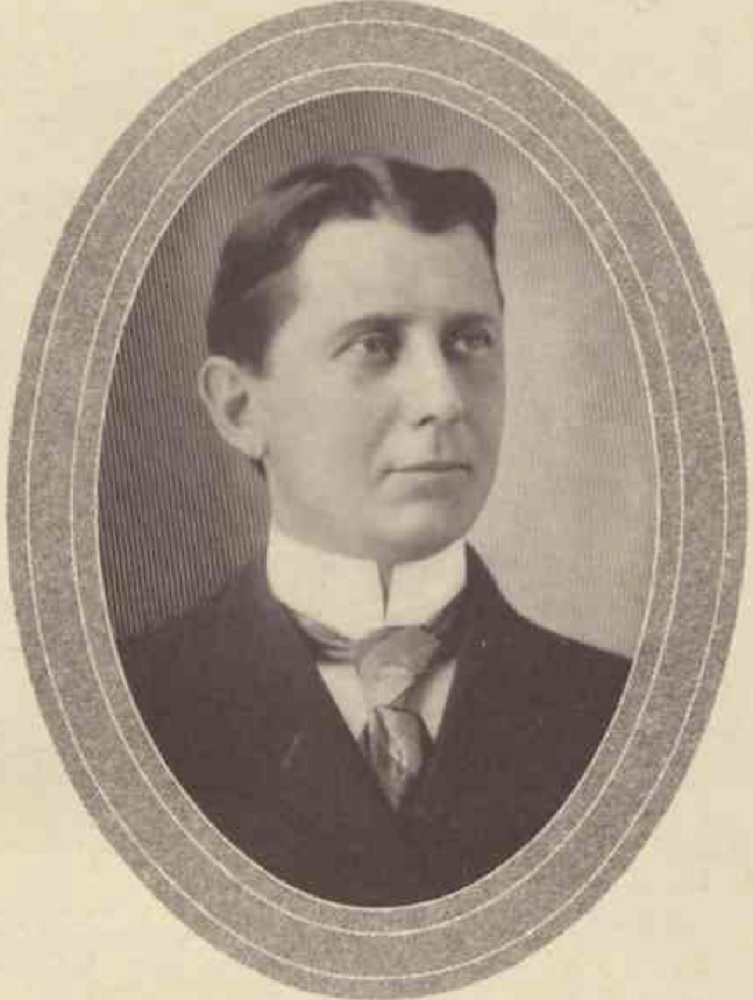

36th Governor of Louisiana
- In office May 9, 1916 – May 11, 1920
- Lieutenant: Fernand Mouton
- Preceded by: Luther E. Hall
- Succeeded by: John M. Parker

30th Attorney General of Louisiana
- In office 1912–1916
- Preceded by: Walter Guion
- Succeeded by: Adolphe V. Coco

Personal details
- Born: June 2, 1871 Union Parish, Louisiana
- Died: September 12, 1937 (aged 66) Shreveport, Louisiana
- Resting place: Forest Park East Cemetery
- Party: Democratic
- Spouse: Anne Ector Pleasant
- Education: Louisiana State University

Military service
- Allegiance: United States
- Branch/service: United States Army
- Years of service: 1898
- Rank: Lieutenant Colonel
- Battles/wars: Spanish–American War

Ruffin Golson Pleasant (June 2, 1871 – September 12, 1937) was an American attorney and politician who was the 36th Governor of Louisiana. Serving from 1916 to 1920, he oversaw the mobilization of the state during World War I. Prior to his governorship, Pleasant was the Louisiana attorney general from 1912 to 1916, and the city attorney of Shreveport from 1902 to 1908.

== Early life ==
Ruffin Golson Pleasant was born in the village of Shiloh in Union Parish on June 2, 1871, to Martha Washington Duty and Benjamin Franklin Pleasant. His father was a Civil War veteran and served several terms as Sheriff of Union Parish and his mother was a homemaker. He was educated at the former Ruston College in Ruston from 1885 to 1886 and then attended Mount Lebanon College, the forerunner of Baptist-affiliated Louisiana College from 1887 to 1889. In 1890 he began studying at Louisiana State University where he became active in college life. He was a member of Kappa Sigma fraternity and was a cofounder and the first director of the campus marching band. He was the quarterback and team captain for the LSU football squad during their inaugural season in 1893. He played in the team's only game of the season against Tulane which started the rivalry between the two. He graduated in 1894 with a bachelor's degree and later studied law at both Harvard College and Yale College. He was admitted to the bar in 1899.

Pleasant volunteered for military service after the start of the Spanish–American War in 1898. He served as a lieutenant-colonel of the First Louisiana Regiment of Infantry and was stationed in Florida. Due to the brevity of the war, he was never deployed to combat and mustered out of the Army in October that same year. After the war, he began his legal practice in Shreveport. He married educator Anne Ector on Valentines Day 1906. The couple had no children.

== Political career ==
Pleasant was the city attorney of Shreveport from 1902 until 1908 and became state attorney general in 1912. Backed by the Regular Democratic Organization, Pleasant defeated Thomas Barret in the Democratic Primary for the 1916 gubernatorial election. He went on to defeat Progressive candidate John M. Parker in the general election, 80,807 votes (62.5%) to Parker's 48,085 (37.2%). At the time Louisiana governors could serve only one four-year term and could not seek a second term until four years had lapsed since the end of a previous term.

After Americas entry into World War I in April 1917, Pleasant mobilized to support the war effort. Eleven major military installations were constructed, and New Orleans’s shipbuilding and port facilities were updated. More than 71,000 Louisianans fought in the war and at least 1,400 sacrificed their lives. Unpopular with many in New Orleans, Pleasant endorsed prohibition when the U.S. Congress passed the Volstead Act. In 1917, Pleasant signed into law a measure by the freshman state senator, Norris C. Williamson, which authorized state funding for the eradication of the cattle tick pest. At the end of his term, Pleasant supported calls for a constitutional convention in 1921, to which he served as a delegate.

After leaving the governorship, Pleasant resumed his law practice in Shreveport. He remained politically active and supported his former opponent John Parker in the 1920 gubernatorial election. He soon broke with his successor over his tax policy and supported Huey Pierce Long Jr. Not long afterward, he broke with Long too and became a leading spokesman for the anti-Long faction of the Louisiana Democratic Party.

Pleasant was a delegate to the Democratic National Convention of 1916, which renominated Woodrow Wilson for president and Thomas Marshall of Indiana for vice president. He was also a delegate to the Democratic convention in 1924, which took 103 ballots to nominate John W. Davis of West Virginia as the party's compromise presidential nominee.

== The later years ==
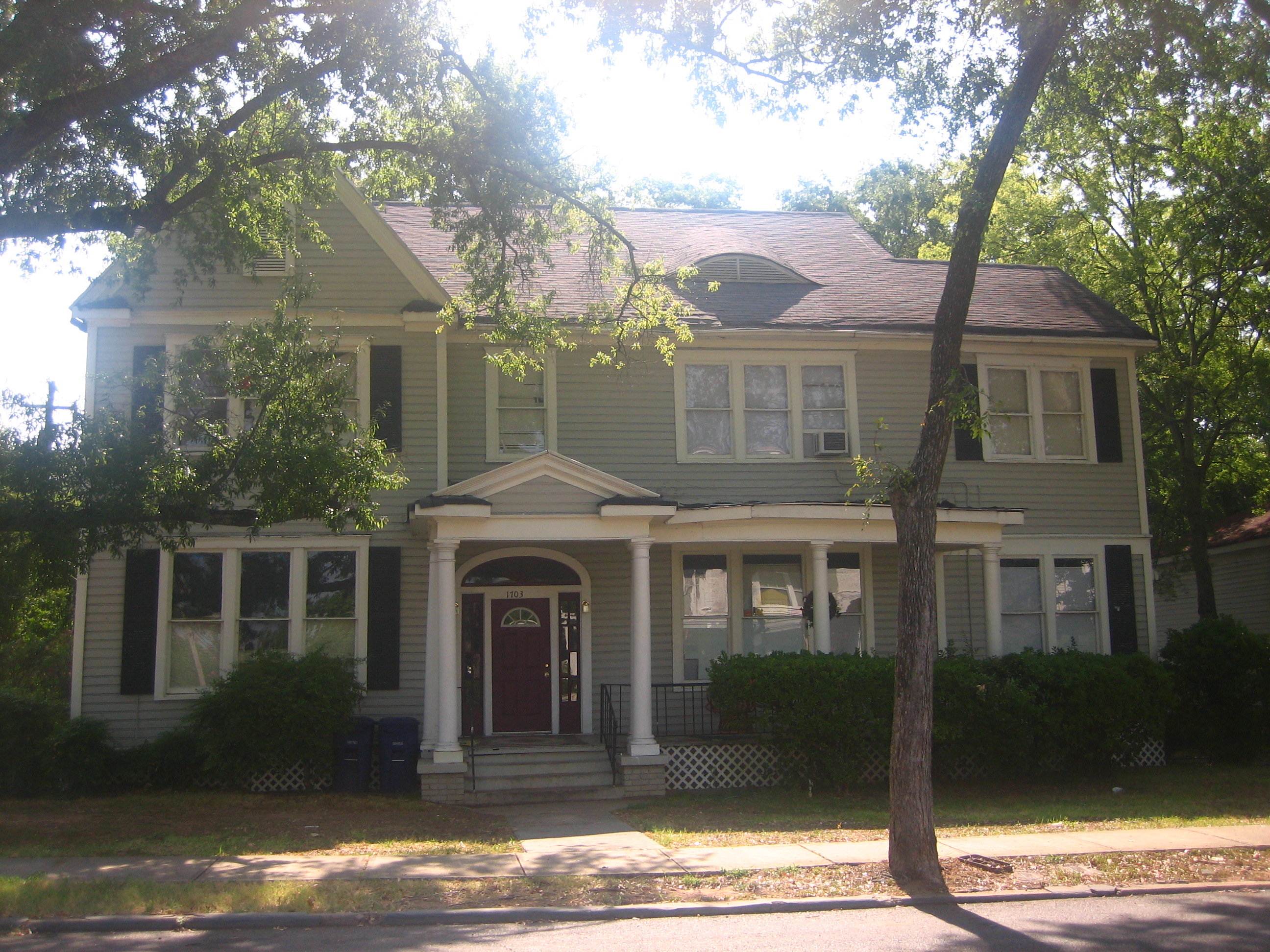
Pleasant Hill, the historic home of Governor and Mrs. Pleasant in the Highlands section of Shreveport

Anne Ector Pleasant died in 1934 after accidentally drinking a poisonous antiseptic in a dark bathroom in their Shreveport home. She was the founder and headmistress of Pleasant Hall, a coed private school in Shreveport. She had sued then U.S. Senator Huey Long for having caused her to be arrested on false charges and for having demeaned her as a "drunken cursing woman" when she sought to examine state public records in the Capitol in Baton Rouge.

Pleasant died in Shreveport four years later. He was Presbyterian. The couple is interred at Forest Park Cemetery off St. Vincent Avenue in Shreveport.

Party political offices
Preceded by Luther E. Hall	Democratic nominee for Governor of Louisiana; 1916	Succeeded by John M. Parker
Legal offices
Preceded by Walter Guion	Attorney General of Louisiana; 1912–1916	Succeeded by Adolphe V. Coco
Political offices
Preceded by Luther E. Hall	Governor of Louisiana; 1916–1920	Succeeded by John M. Parker
