= 1916 Republican National Convention =

American political convention

- 1916 presidential election
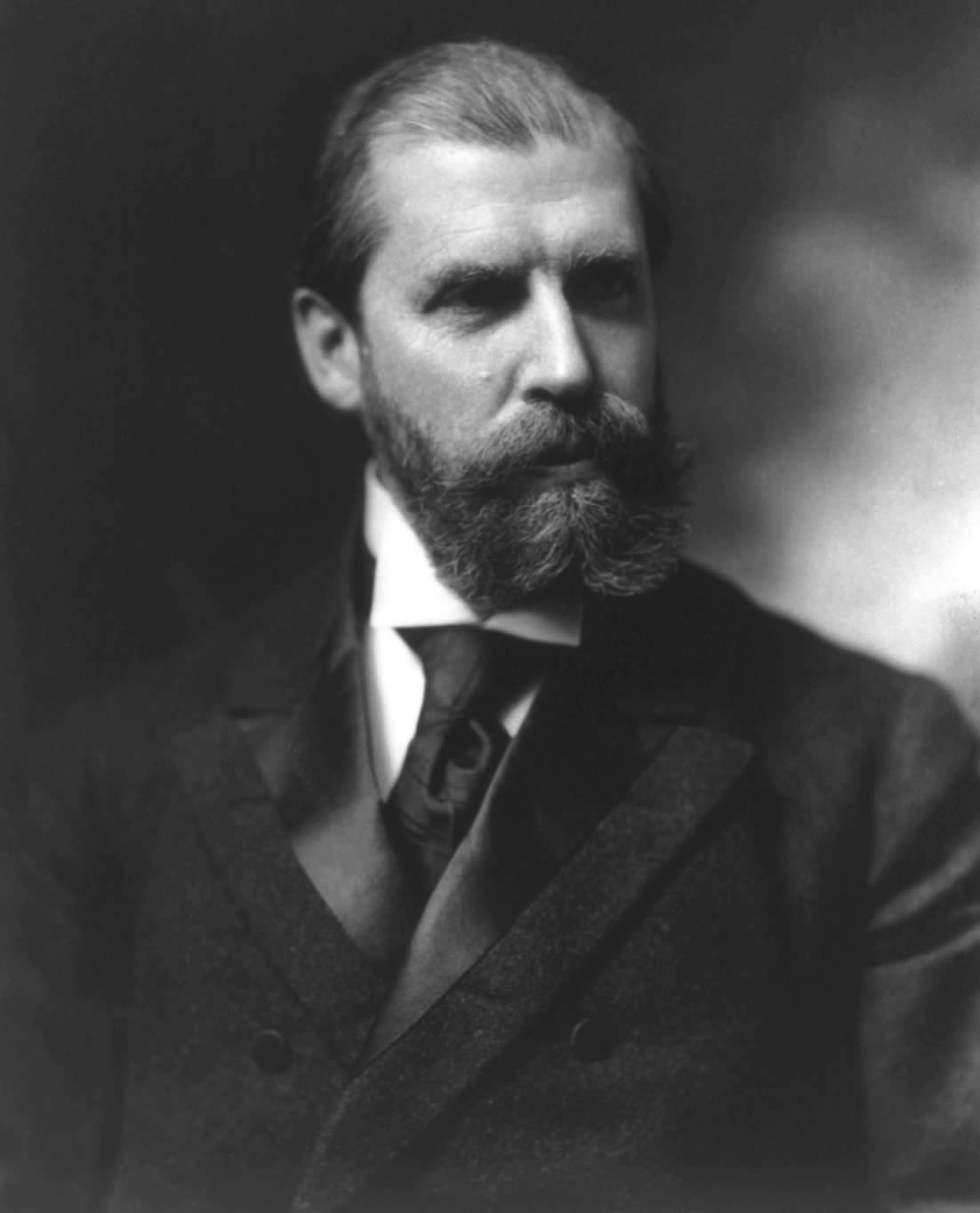
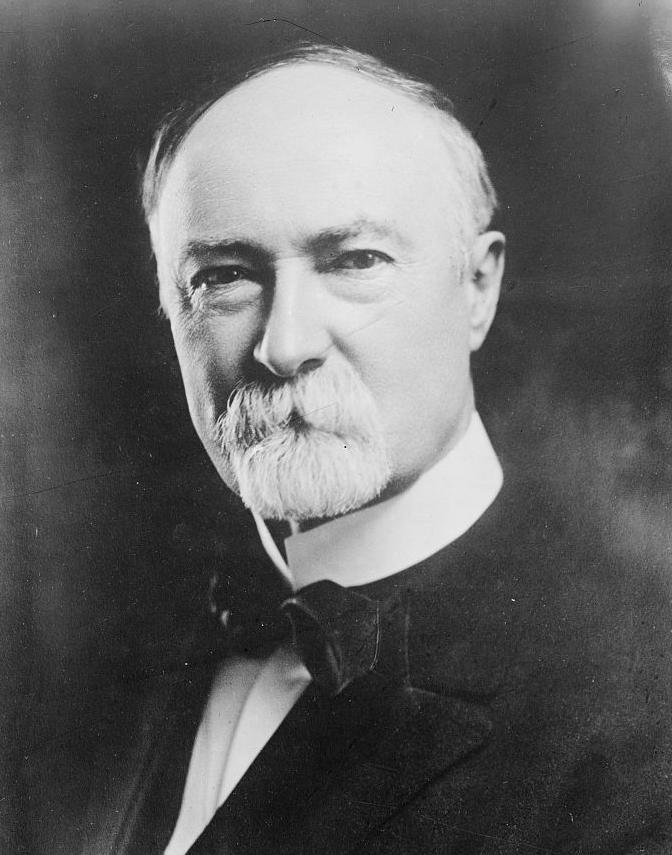
- Nominees; Hughes and Fairbanks

Convention
- Date(s): June 7–10, 1916
- City: Chicago, Illinois
- Venue: Chicago Coliseum

Candidates
- Presidential nominee: Charles Evans Hughes of New York
- Vice-presidential nominee: Charles W. Fairbanks of Indiana

Voting
- Total delegates: 987
- Votes needed for nomination: 494
- Ballots: 3

Film of the convention

The 1916 Republican National Convention was held in Chicago from June 7 to June 10. A major goal of the party's bosses at the convention was to heal the bitter split within the party that had occurred in the 1912 presidential campaign. In that year, Theodore Roosevelt bolted the GOP and formed his own political party, the Progressive Party, which contained most of the GOP's liberals. William Howard Taft, the incumbent president, won the nomination of the regular Republican Party. This split in the GOP ranks divided the Republican vote and led to the election of Democrat Woodrow Wilson.

Although several candidates were openly competing for the 1916 nomination—most prominently conservative Senator Elihu Root of New York, Senator John W. Weeks of Massachusetts, and liberal Senator Albert Cummins of Iowa—the party's bosses wanted a moderate who would be acceptable to all factions of the party. They turned to Supreme Court Justice Charles Evans Hughes, who had served on the court since 1910 and thus had the advantage of not having publicly spoken about political issues in six years. Although he had not sought the nomination, Hughes made it known that he would not turn it down; he won the presidential nomination on the third ballot. Former Vice President Charles W. Fairbanks was nominated as his running mate.

Hughes is the only Supreme Court Justice to be nominated for president by a major political party. Fairbanks is the last former vice president to be nominated for vice president.

Then-Senator Warren G. Harding is credited with coining the phrase "Founding Fathers" during his keynote address.

== Presidential nomination ==
=== Presidential candidates ===
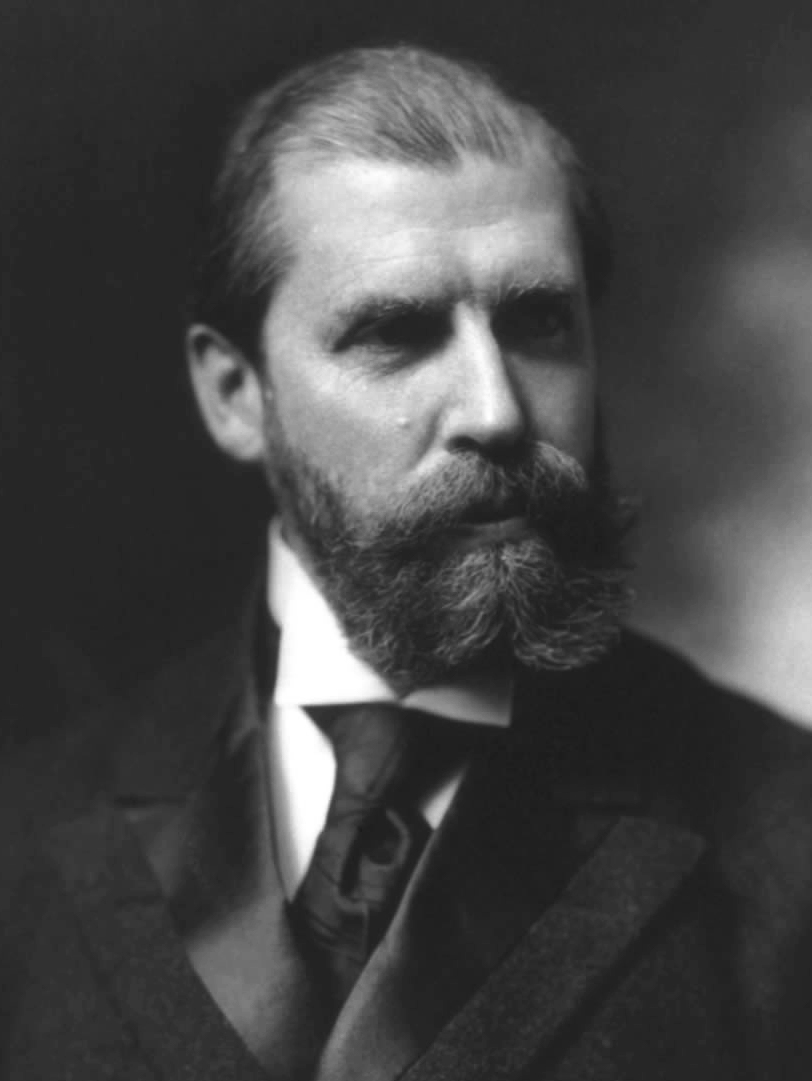
Associate Justice Charles Evans Hughes of New York

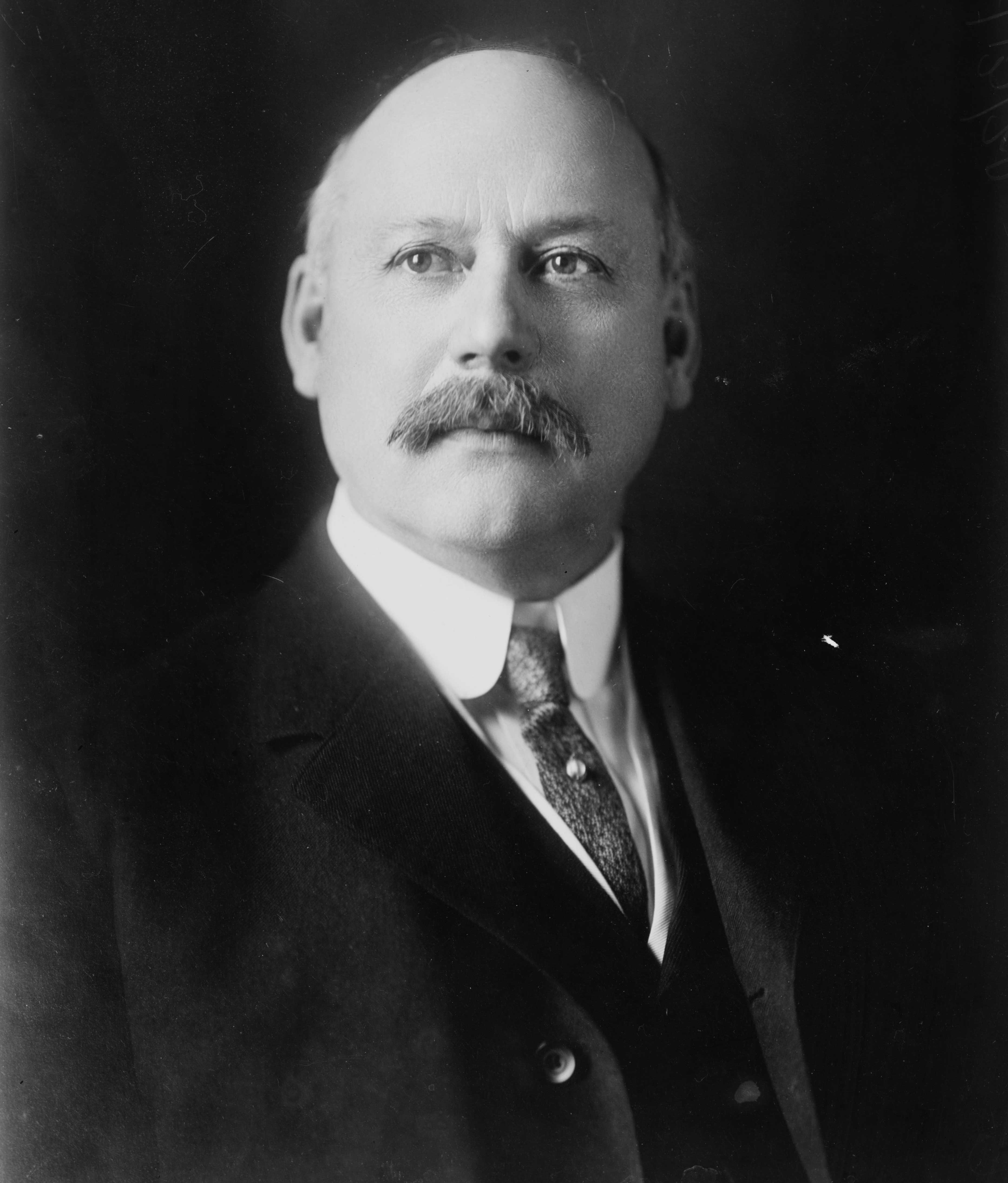
Senator
John W. Weeks
of Massachusetts

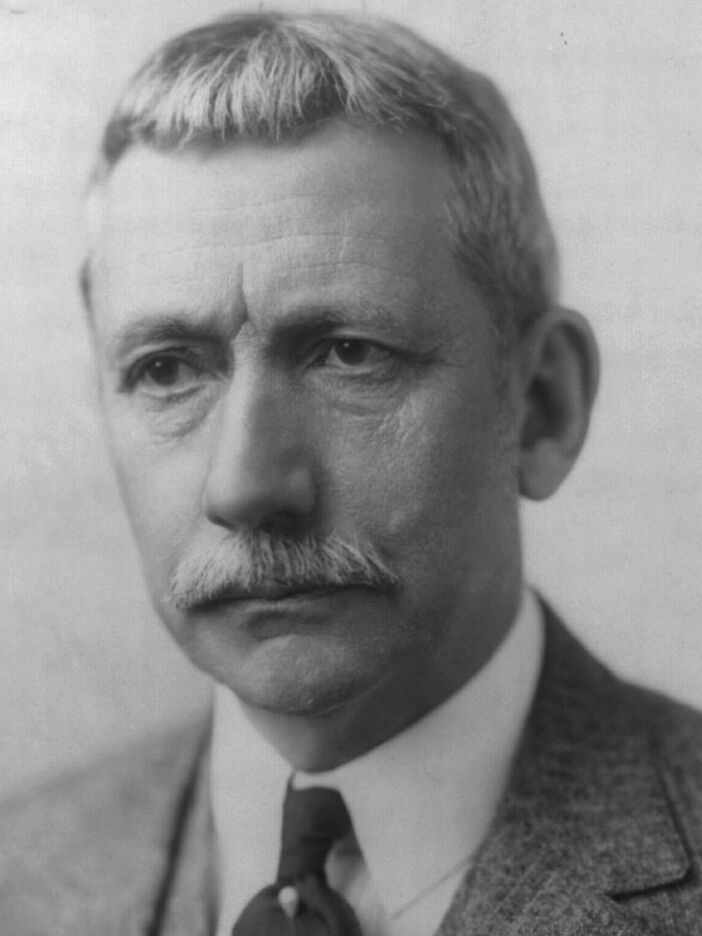
Former Senator
Elihu Root
of New York
(Withdrawn during 3rd Ballot)

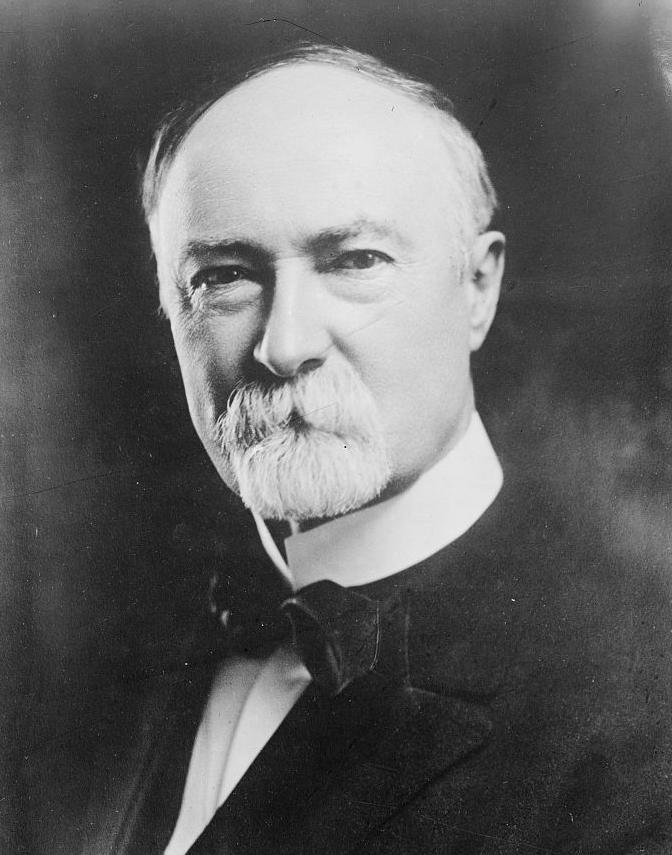
Former Vice President
Charles W. Fairbanks
of Indiana
(Withdrawn during 3rd Ballot)

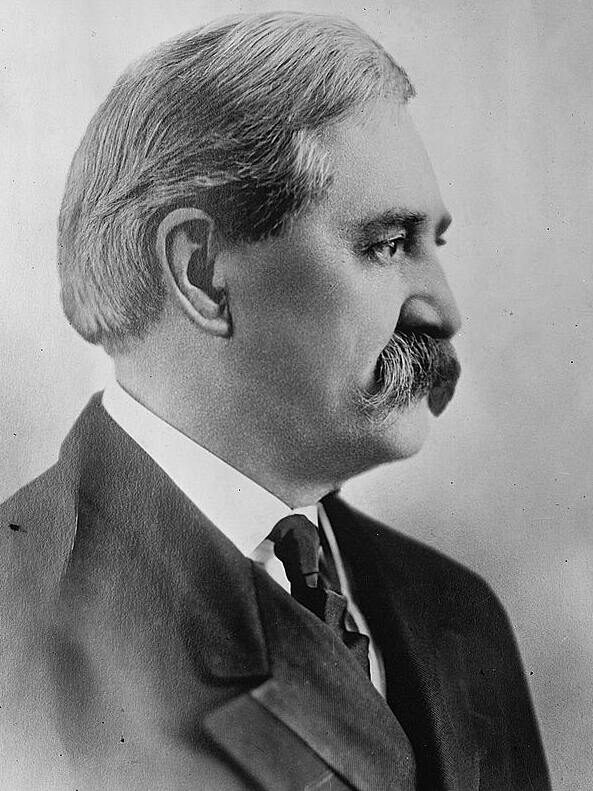
Senator
Albert B. Cummins
of Iowa
(Withdrawn during 3rd Ballot)

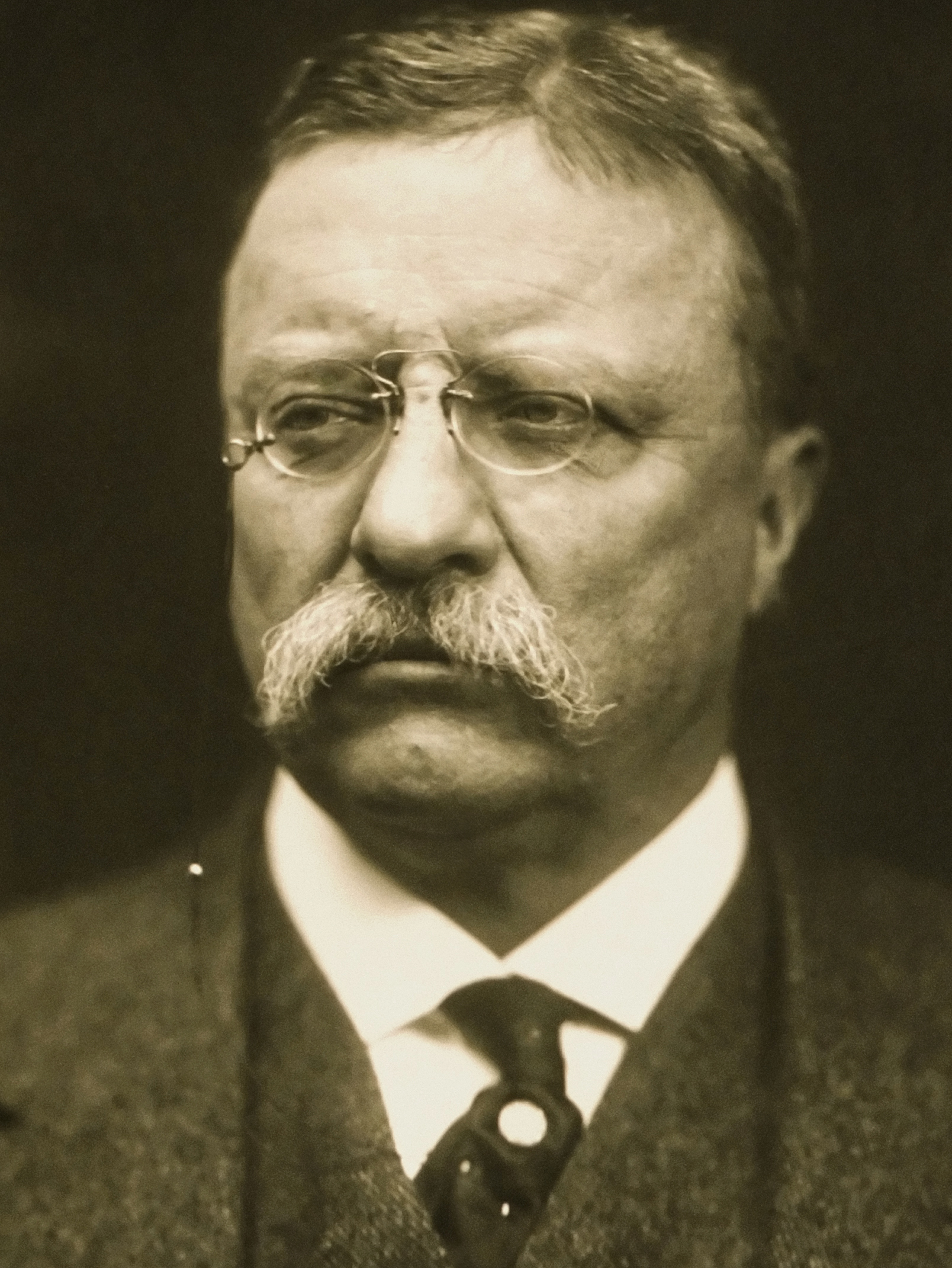
Former President
Theodore Roosevelt
of New York
(Withdrawn during 3rd Ballot, endorsed Hughes)

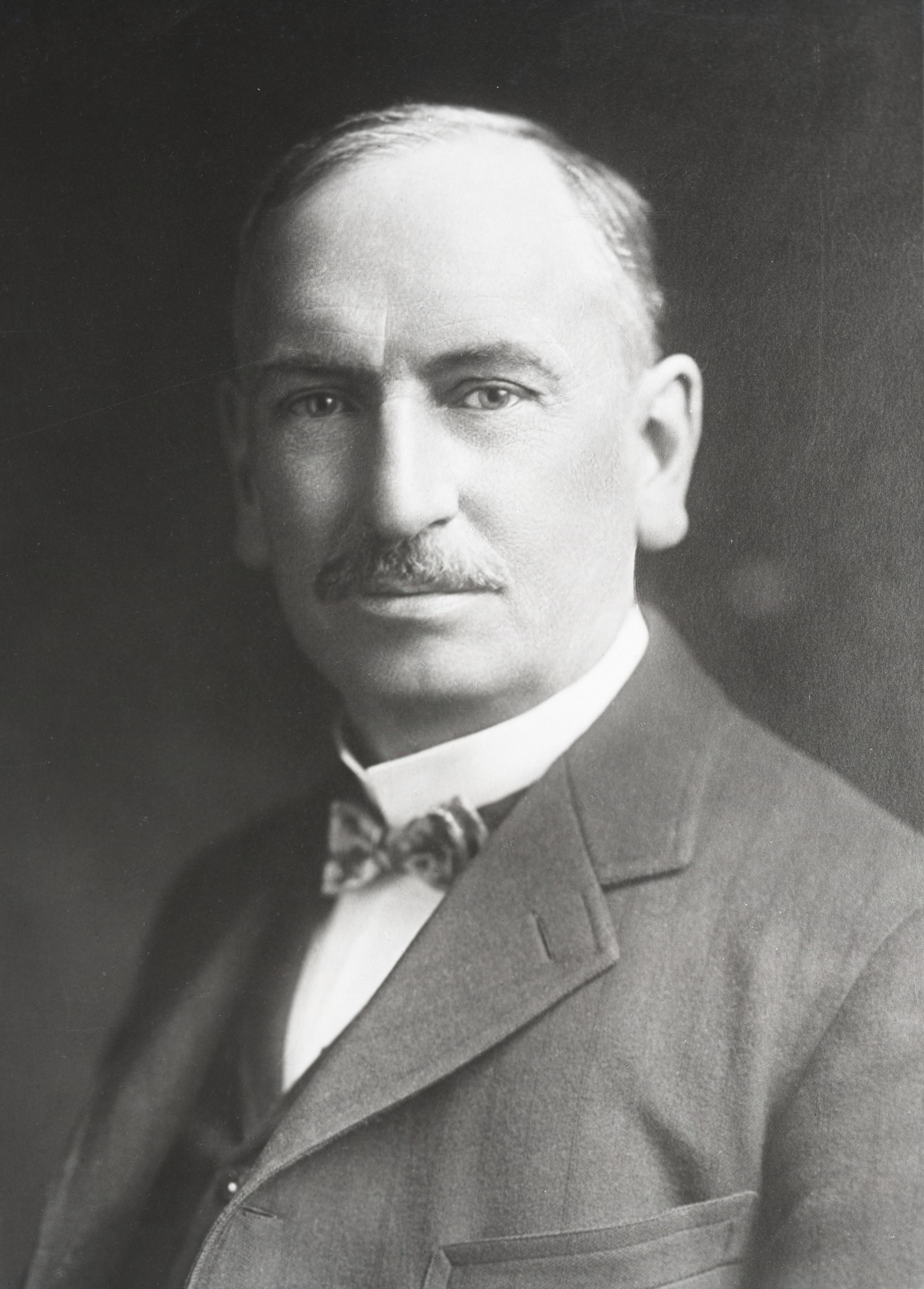
Former Senator
Theodore E. Burton
of Ohio
(Withdrawn during 3rd Ballot)

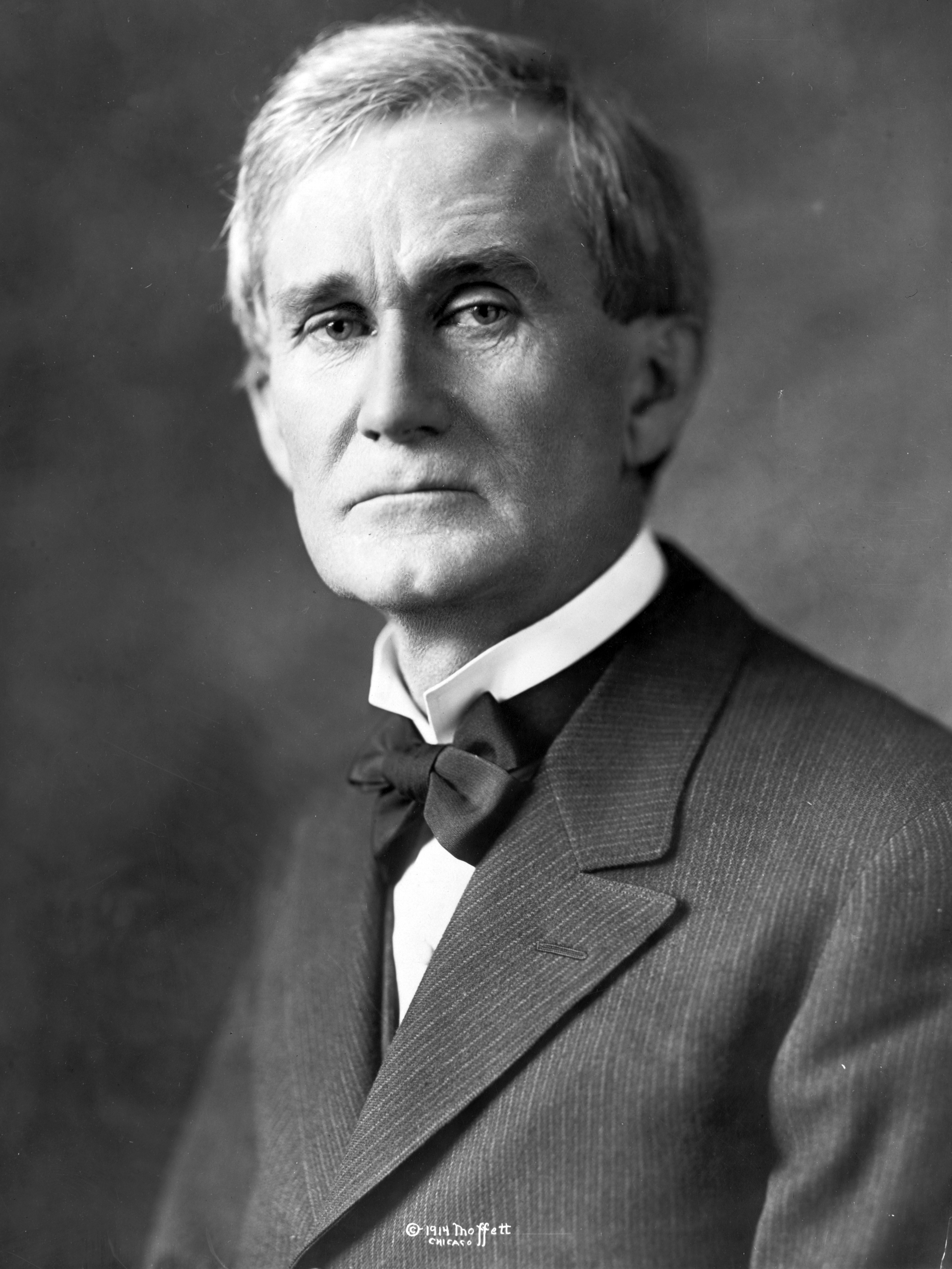
Senator
Lawrence Y. Sherman
of Illinois

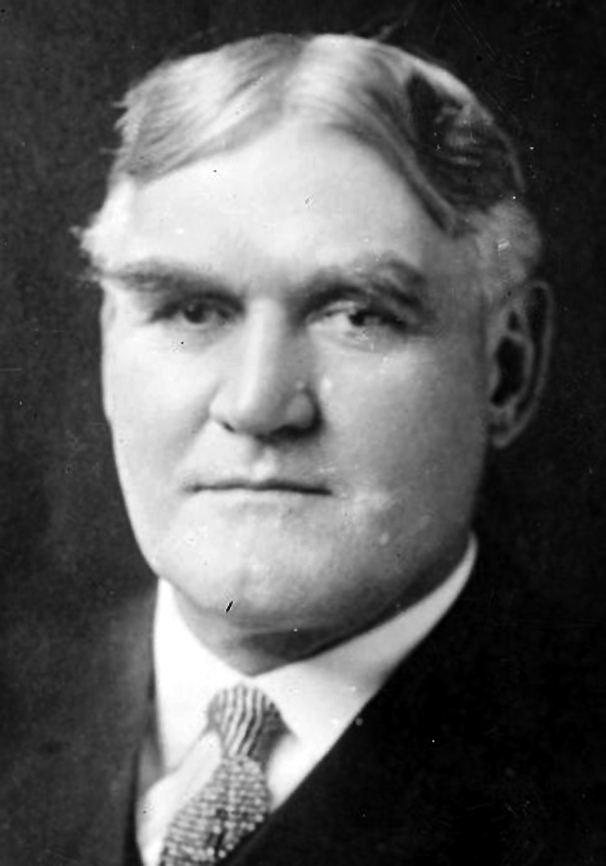
Governor
Martin G. Brumbaugh
of Pennsylvania
(Withdrew after 1st Ballot)

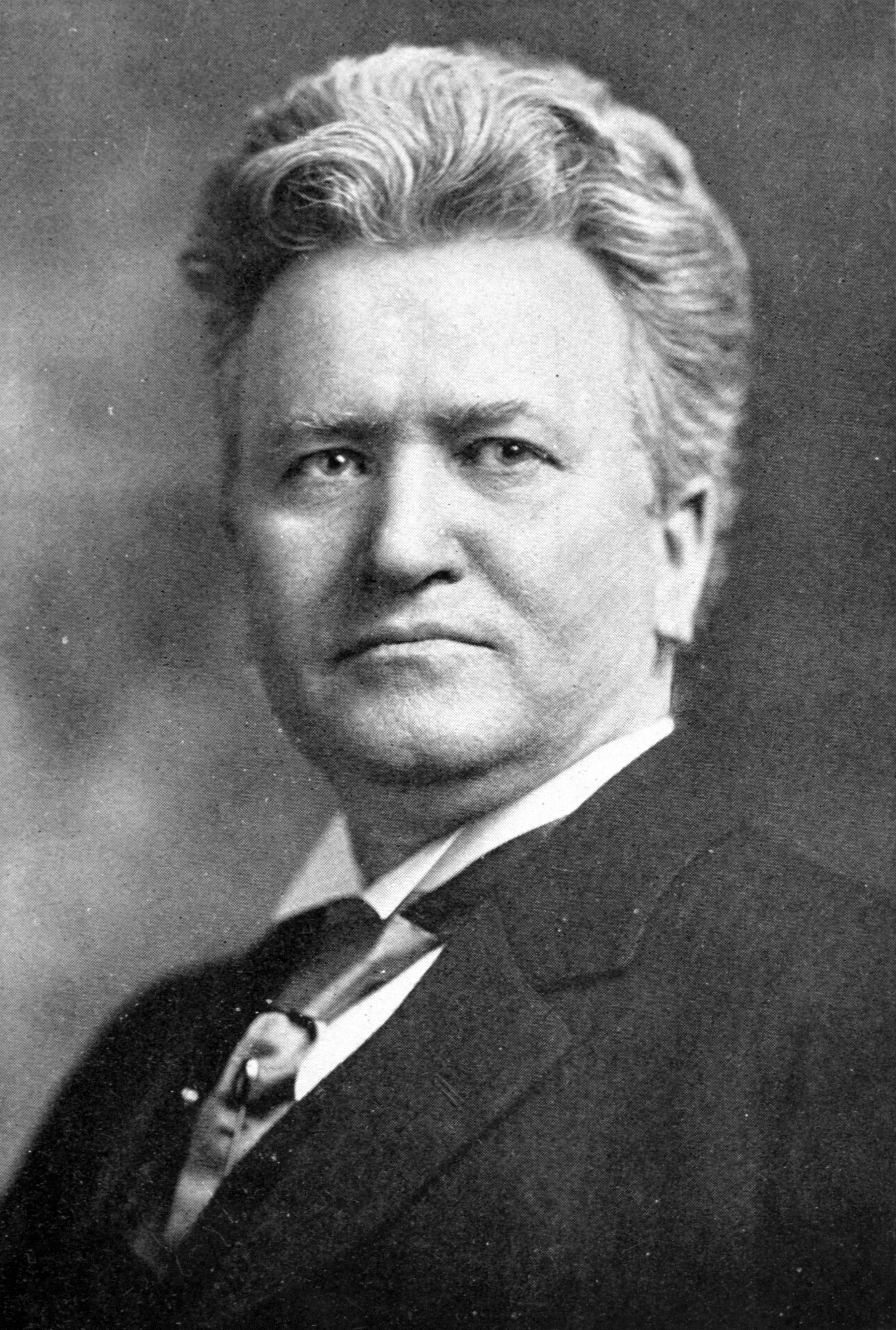
Senator
Robert M. La Follette
of Wisconsin

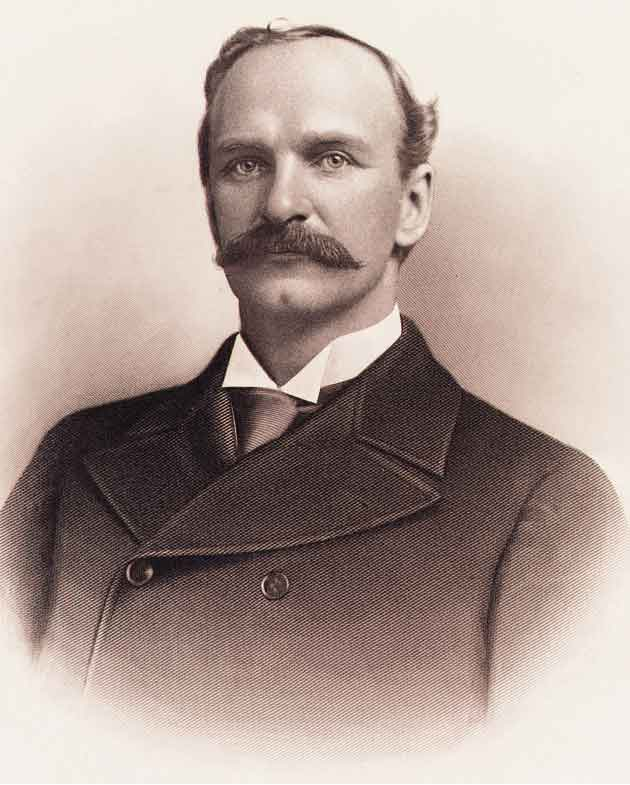
RNC Member
T. Coleman du Pont
of Delaware

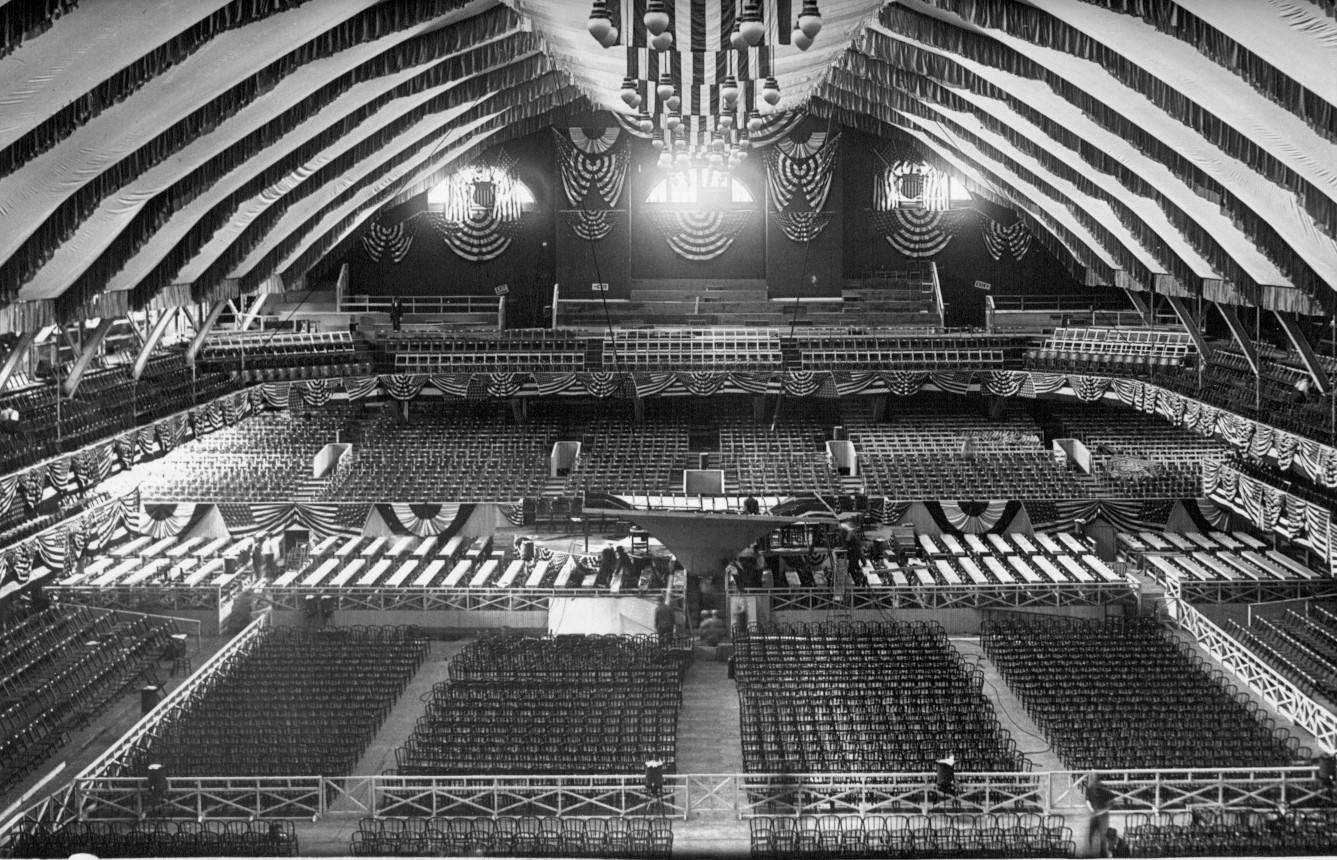
Coliseum set-up for the convention

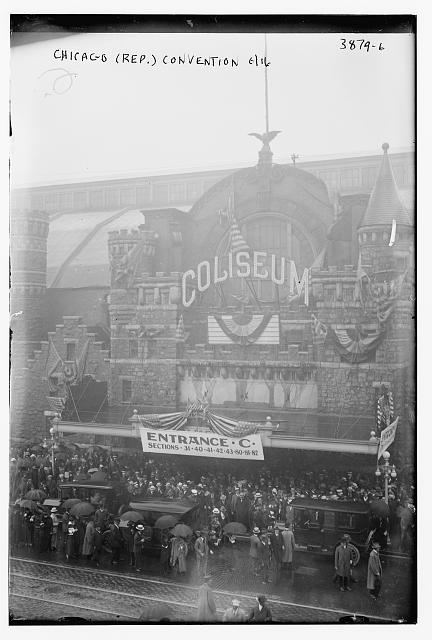
Republican Convention, The Coliseum, Chicago

At the start, Supreme Court Justice Charles Evans Hughes was widely seen as the favorite due to his ability to unite the party, though the nomination of a dark horse candidate such as Massachusetts Senator Henry Cabot Lodge or General Leonard Wood seemed possible. Many Republicans sought to nominate a candidate palatable to Theodore Roosevelt in hopes of averting another third-party run by progressive Republicans, though these Republicans were unwilling to nominate Roosevelt himself. Roosevelt's influence put a stop to the potential presidential candidacies of former Ohio Senator Theodore E. Burton and current Ohio Senator Warren G. Harding. Former Vice President Charles W. Fairbanks made a run at the presidency and attempted to curry Roosevelt's support, but Roosevelt refused to support Fairbanks. Hughes won the nomination on the third ballot, and Roosevelt chose to forgo a third-party bid.

Presidential Ballot
Candidate	1st	2nd	3rd	Unanimous
Hughes	253.5	328.5	949.5	987
Weeks	105	79	3	
Root	103	98.5	0	
Fairbanks	74.5	88.5	0	
Cummins	85	85	0	
Roosevelt	65	81	18.5	
Burton	77.5	76.5	0	
Sherman	66	65	0	
Knox	36	36	0	
Ford	32	0	0	
Brumbaugh	29	0	0	
La Follette	25	25	3	
Taft	14	0	0	
du Pont	12	13	5	
Lodge	0	0	7	
Wanamaker	0	5	0	
Willis	4	1	0	
Borah	2	0	0	
Harding	0	1	0	
McCall	1	1	0	
Wood	0	1	0	
Not Voting	2.5	2	1	
Not Represented	4	4	4	4

Presidential Balloting / 3rd Day of Convention (June 9, 1916)

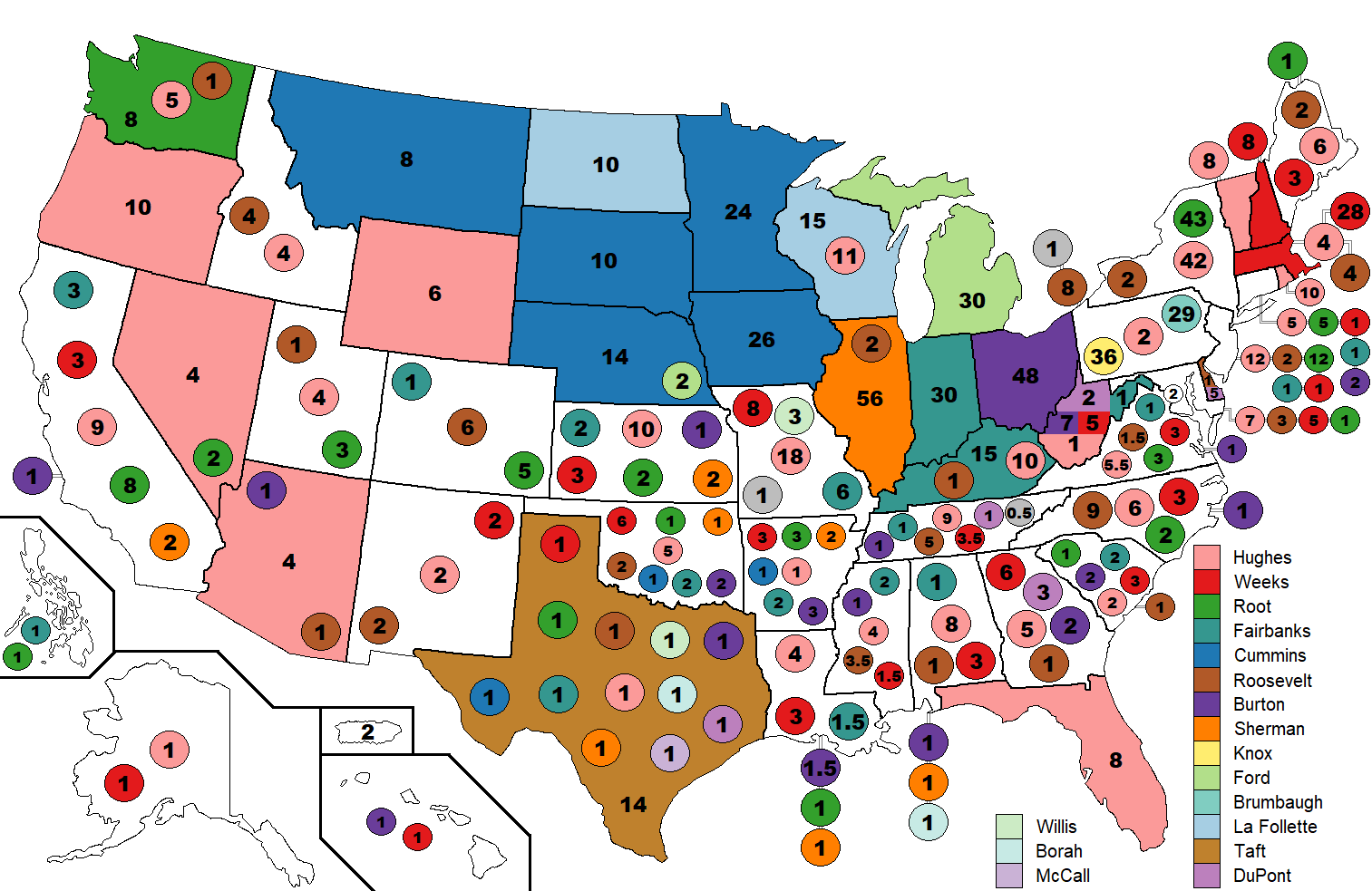
1st Presidential Ballot

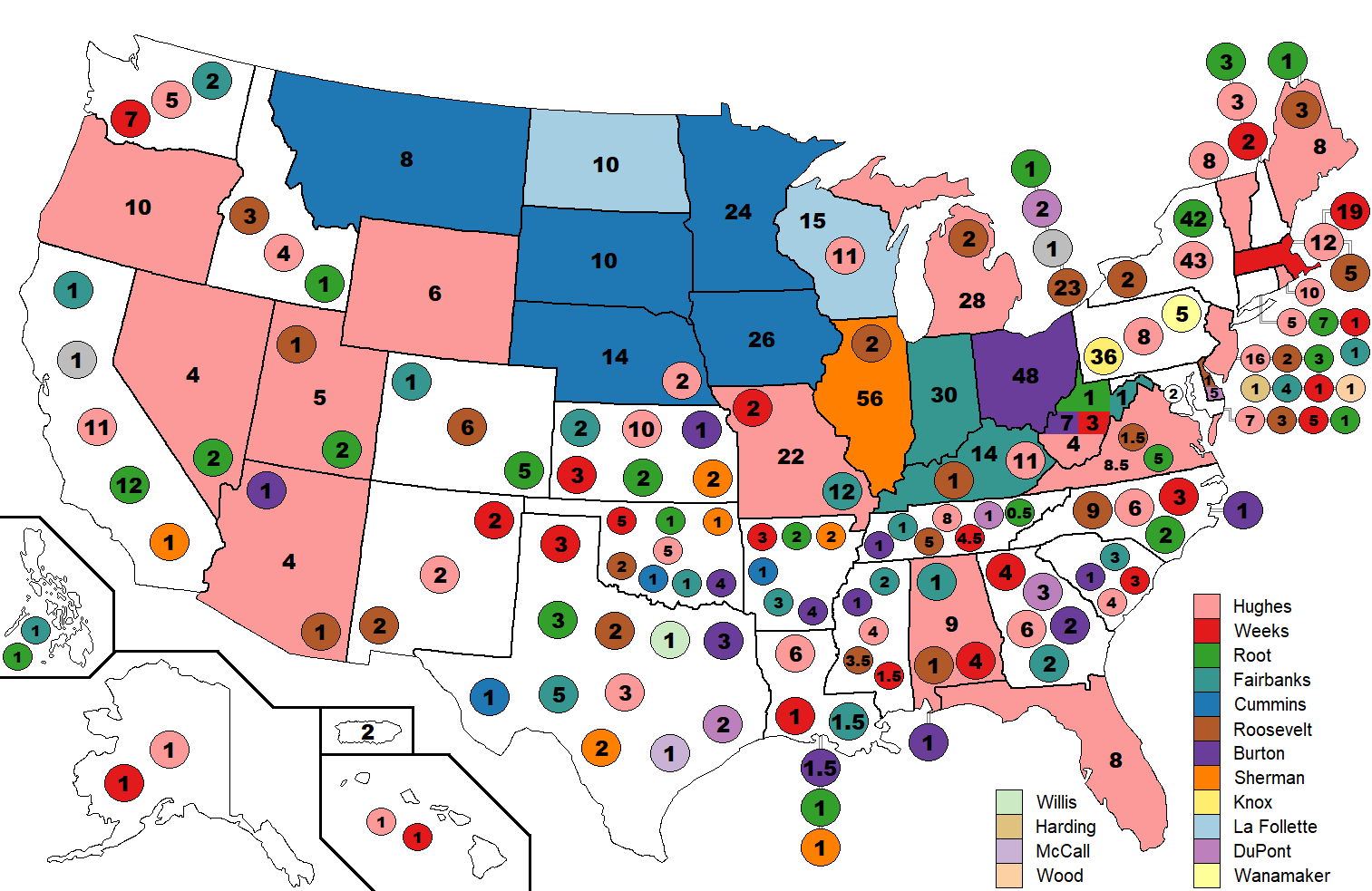
2nd Presidential Ballot

Presidential Balloting / 4th Day of Convention (June 10, 1916)

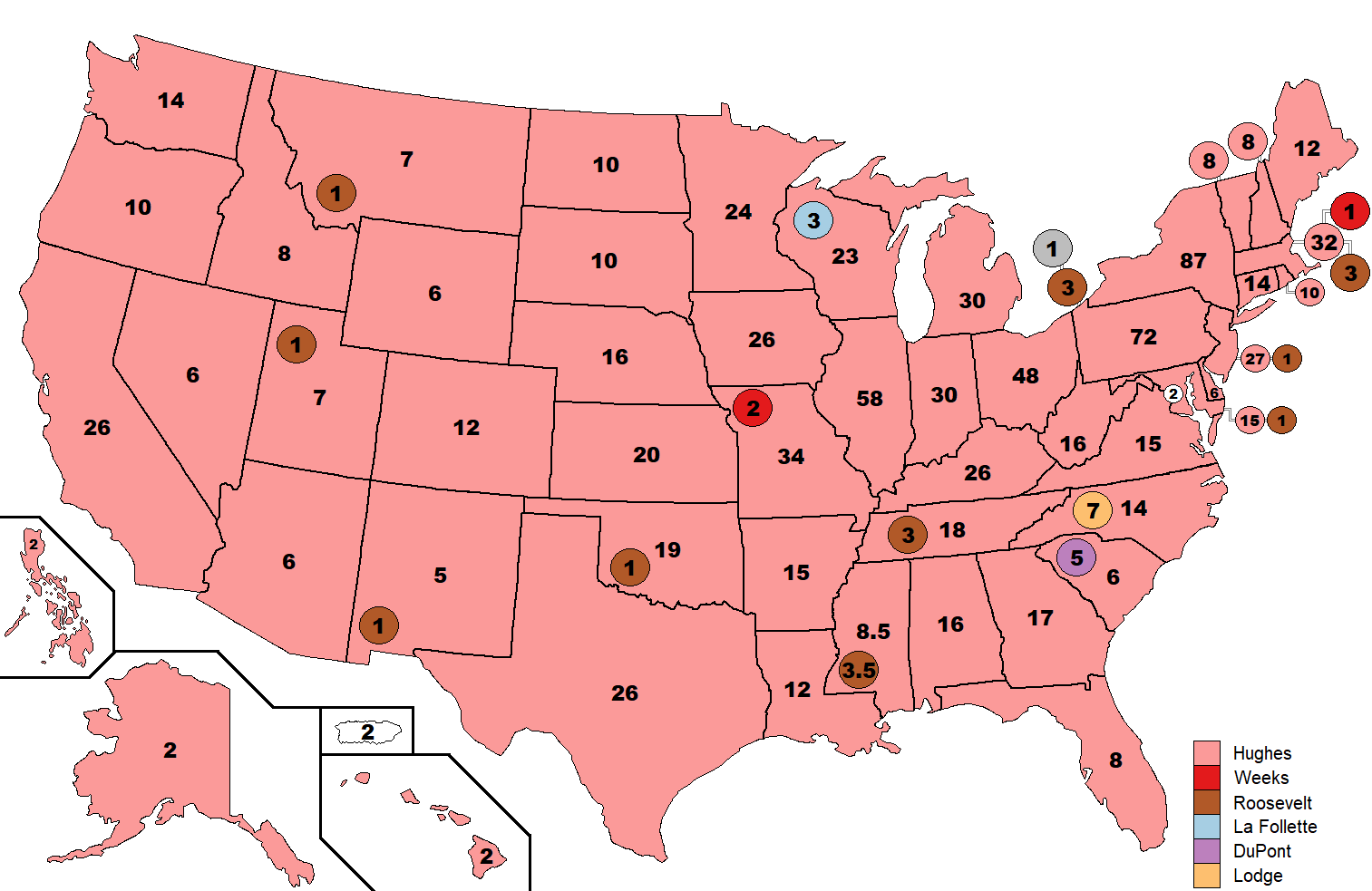
3rd Presidential Ballot

== Vice Presidential nomination ==
=== Vice Presidential candidates ===
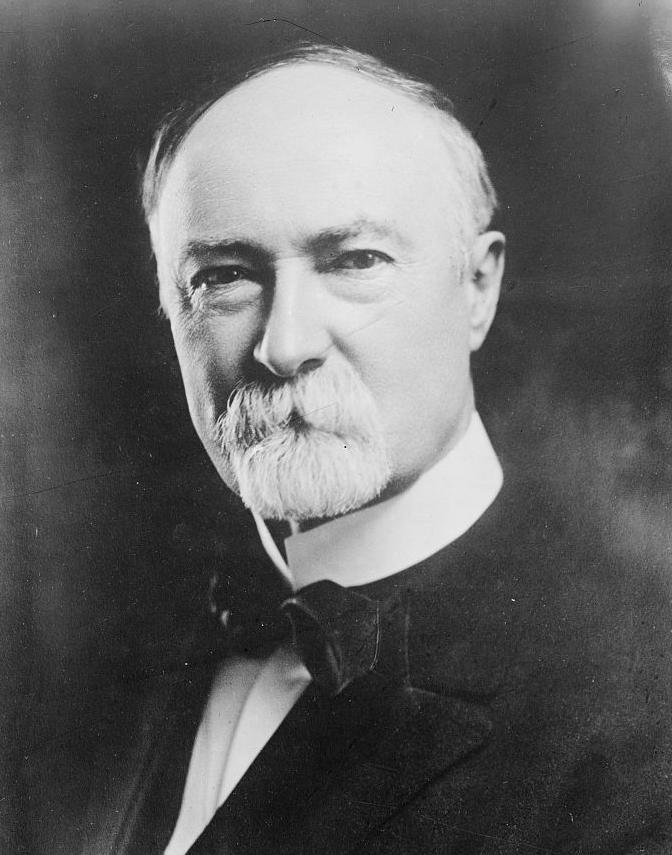
Former Vice President Charles W. Fairbanks of Indiana

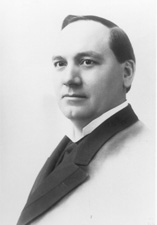
Former Senator
Elmer Burkett
of Nebraska

Former Vice President Charles W. Fairbanks had no interest in serving another term as vice president, but when the party nominated him, he accepted the nomination.

Vice Presidential Ballot
Candidate	1st	Unanimous
Fairbanks	863	987
Burkett	108	
Borah	8	
Webster	2	
Burton	1	
Johnson	1	
Not Voting	4	
Not Represented	4	4

Vice Presidential Balloting / 4th Day of Convention (June 10, 1916)

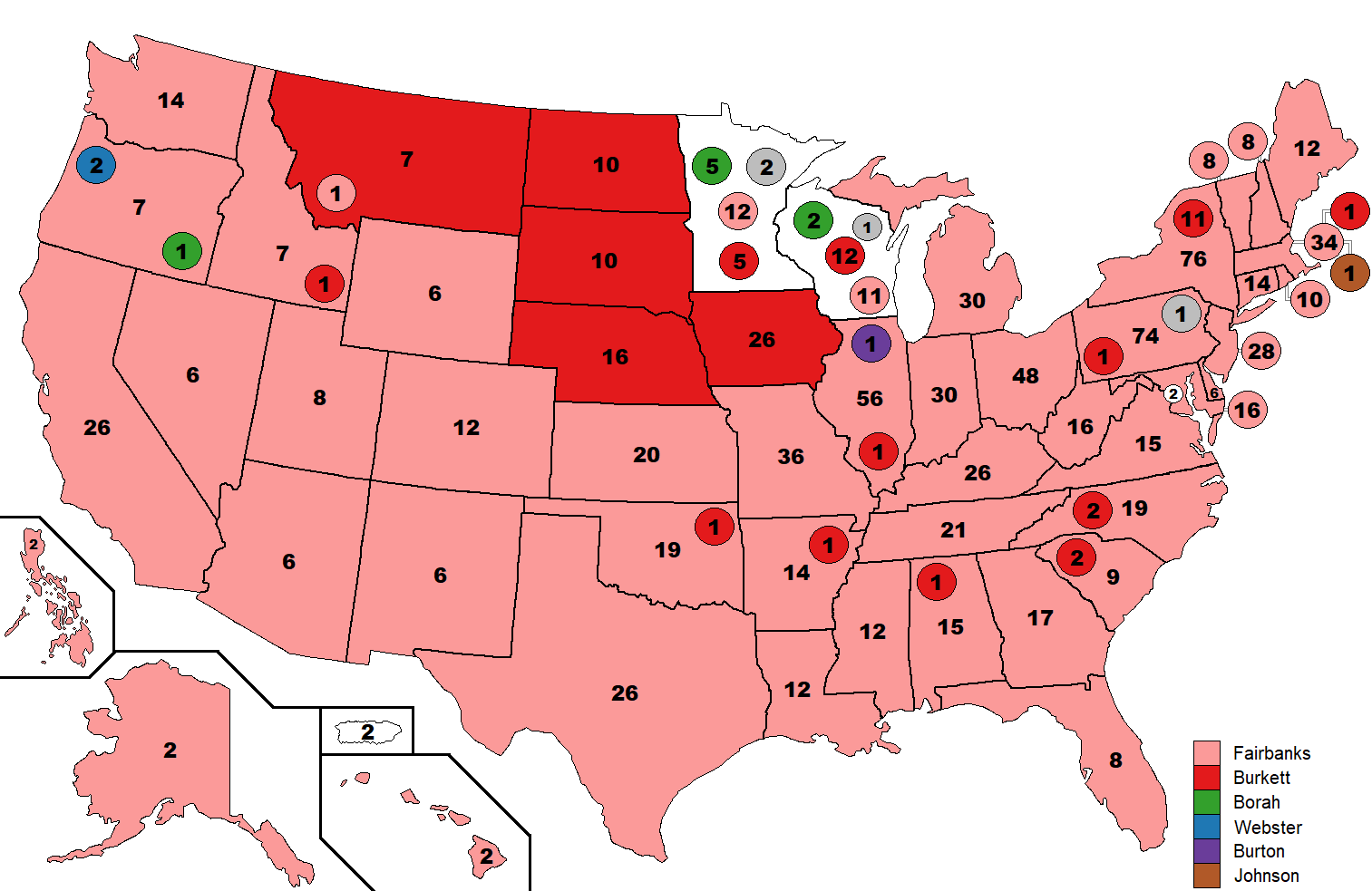
1st
Vice Presidential Ballot

== Coinciding women's suffrage conventions in Chicago ==
Coinciding with the Republican convention, both the Congressional Union for Woman Suffrage and the National American Woman Suffrage Association held conventions in Chicago. The Congressional Union, at their convention in the Auditorium Theatre, promoted the so-called "Susan B. Anthony Amendment", later ratified as the Nineteenth Amendment to the United States Constitution. The Congressional Union also created the National Woman's Party at their event.

== See also ==
- History of the United States Republican Party
- List of Republican National Conventions
- United States presidential nominating convention
- 1916 Republican Party presidential primaries
- 1916 United States presidential election
- 1916 Democratic National Convention

Preceded by 1912; Chicago, Illinois	Republican National Conventions	Succeeded by 1920; Chicago, Illinois
