= 1916 Republican Party presidential primaries =

Selection of Republican US presidential candidate

- February 9 to June 6, 1916

987 delegates to the 1916 Republican National Convention 494 (majority) votes needed to win
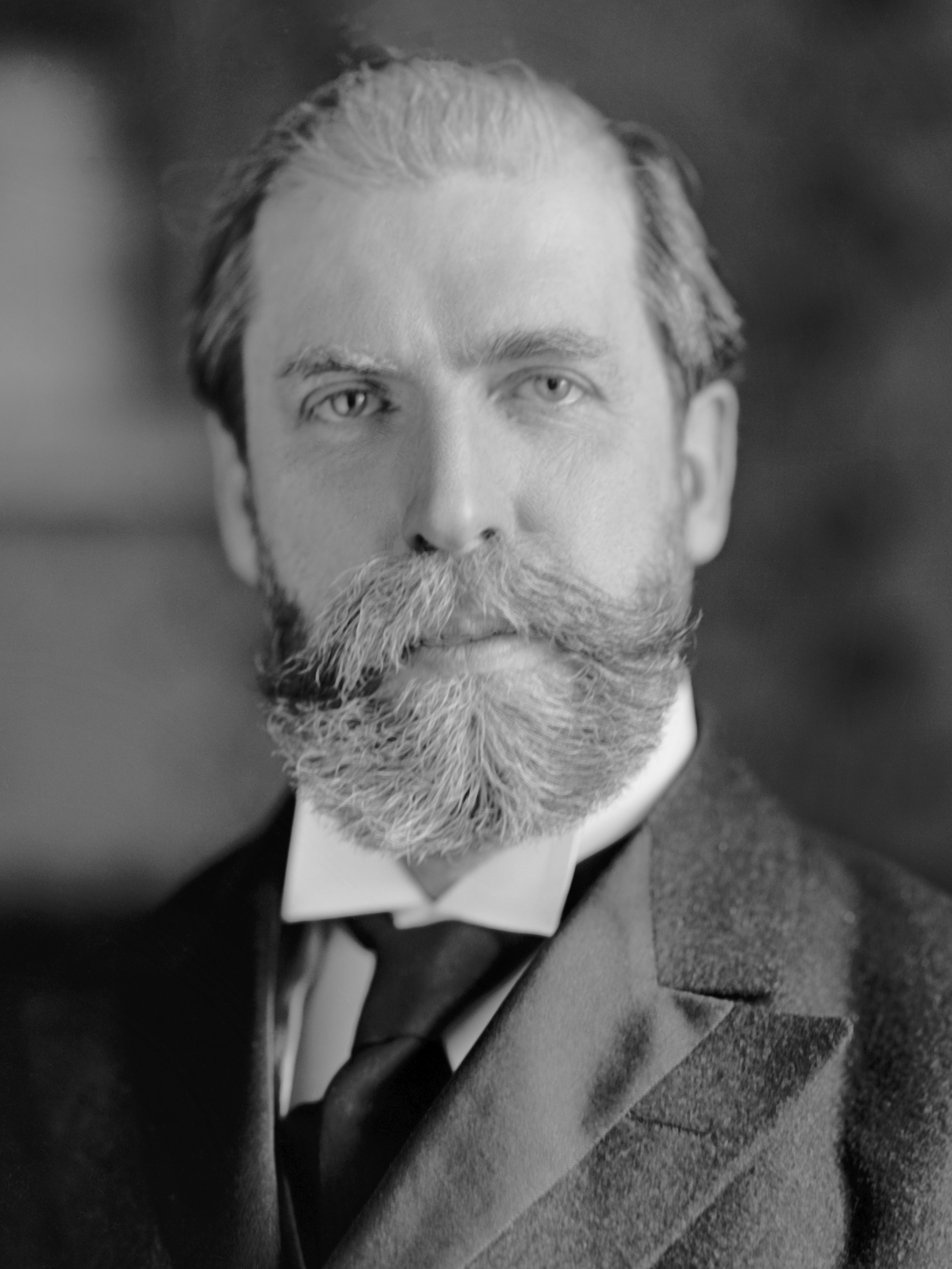

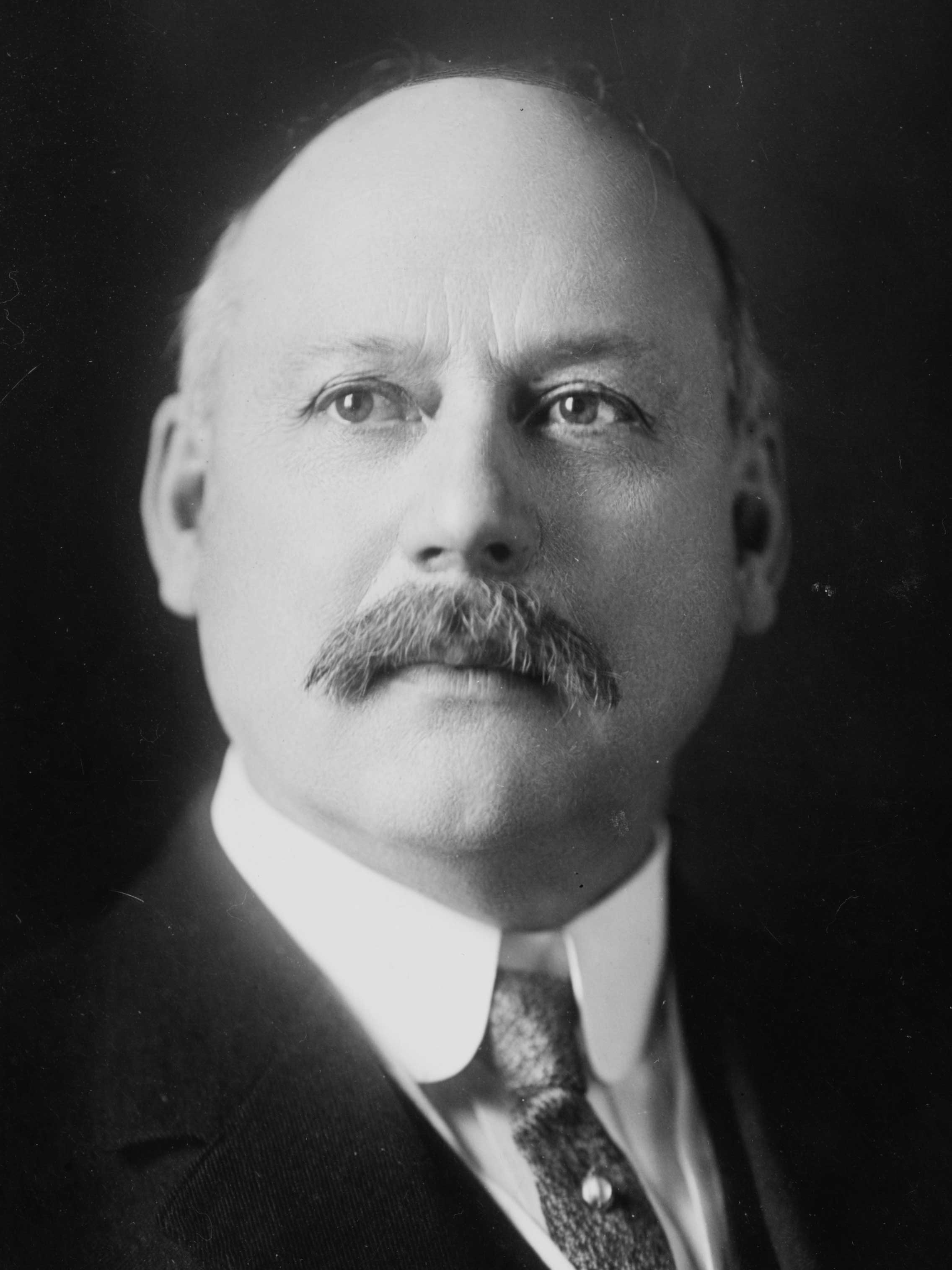

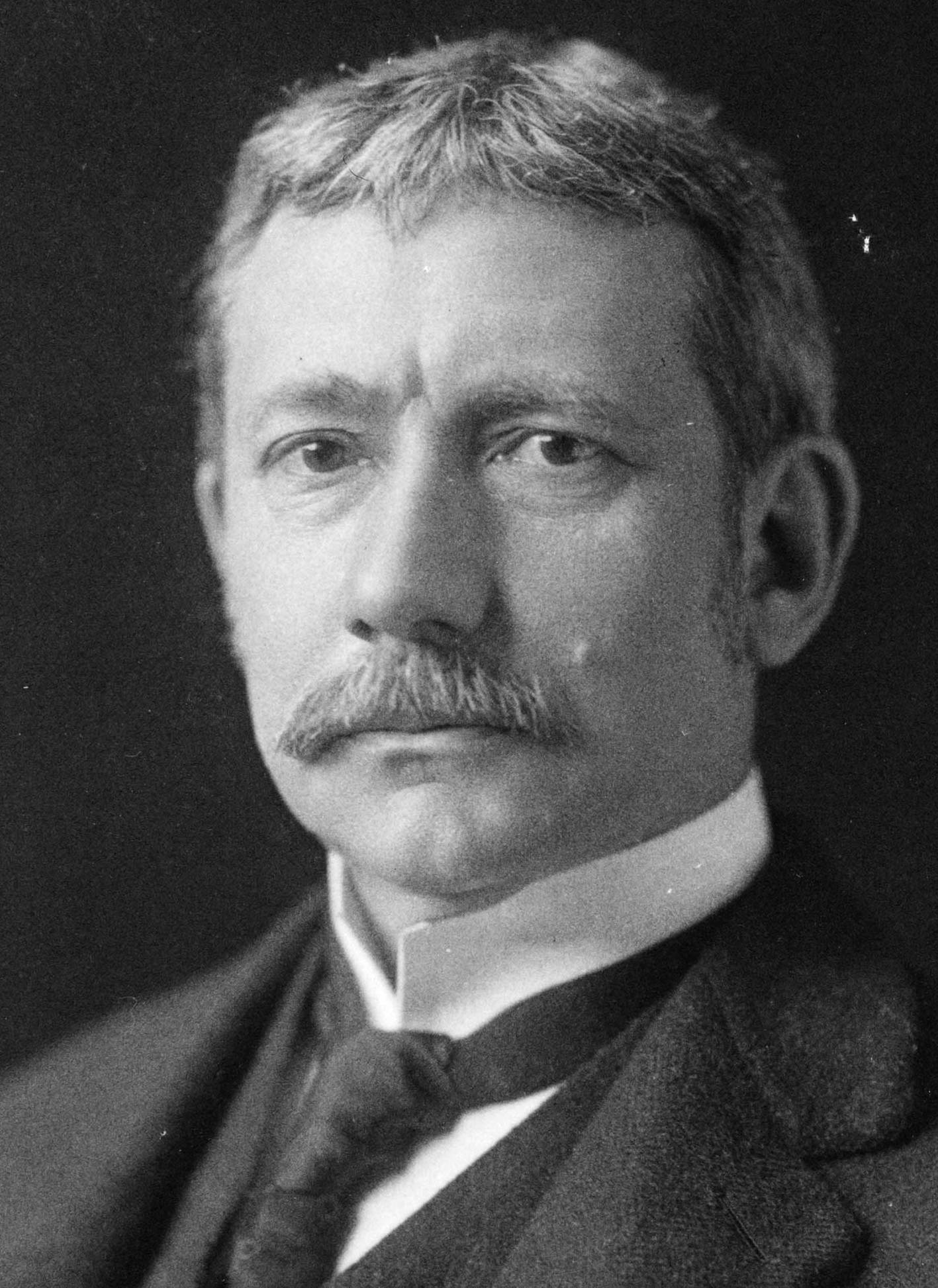

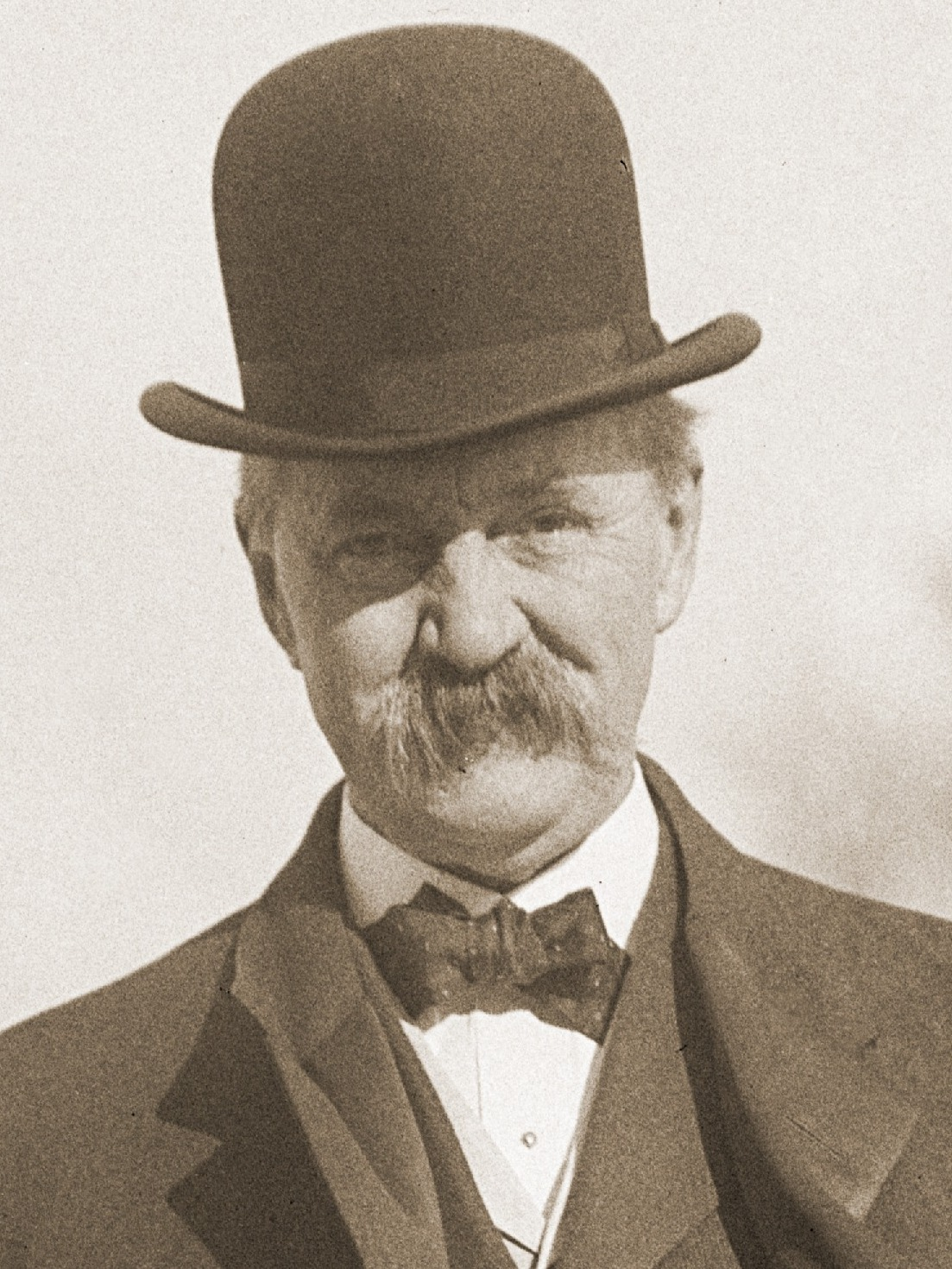

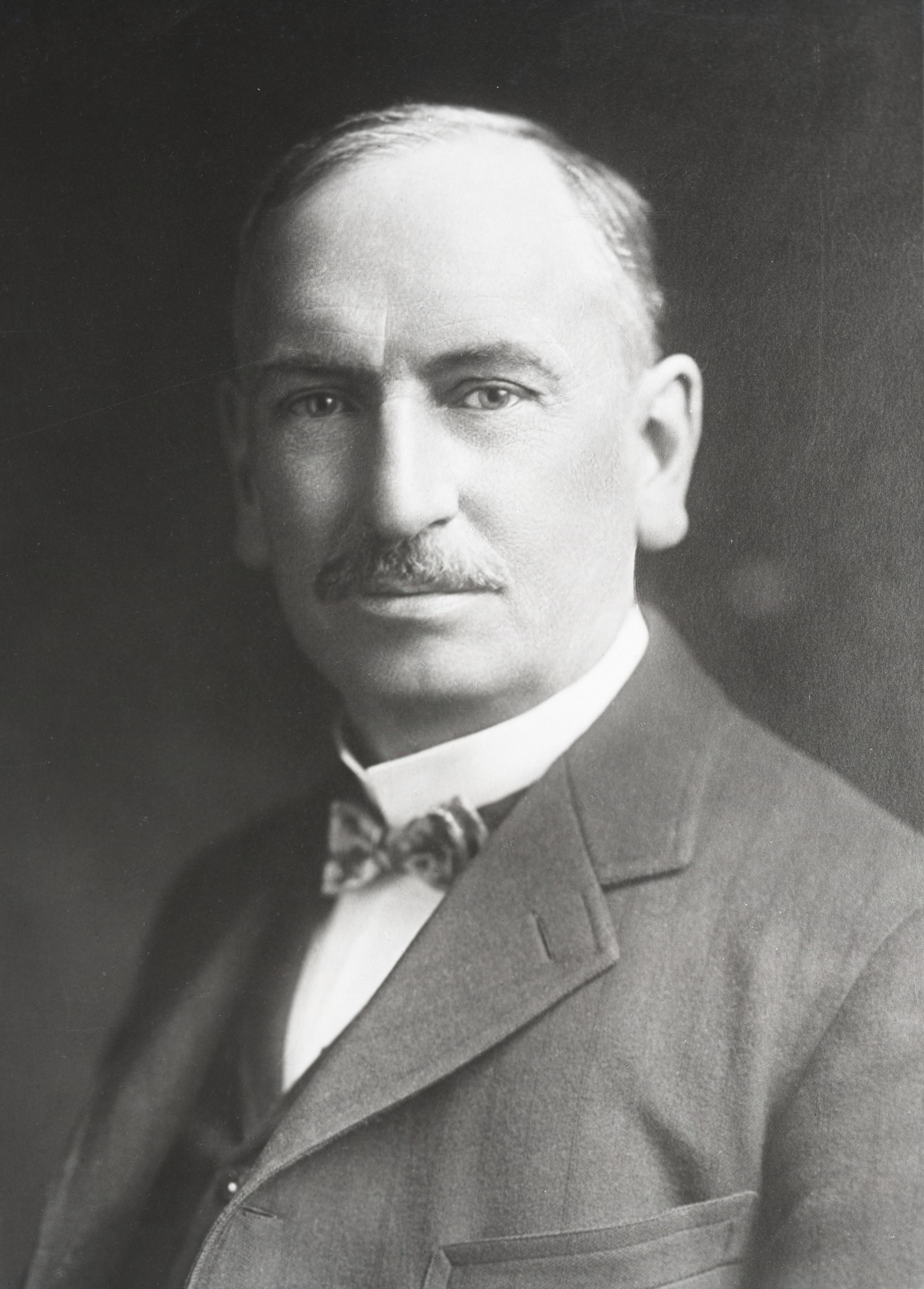

Candidate	Charles Evans Hughes	John W. Weeks	Elihu Root
Home state	New York	Massachusetts	New York
Delegate count	253.5 (Note: As recorded on the opening ballot.)	105 (Note: As recorded on the opening ballot.)	103 (Note: As recorded on the opening ballot.)
Contests won	2	–	–
Popular vote	80,737	–	–
Percentage	4.2%	–	–
Candidate	Albert B. Cummins	Theodore E. Burton	Charles W. Fairbanks
Home state	Iowa	Ohio	Indiana
Delegate count	85	77.5	74.5
Contests won	5	2	1
Popular vote	191,950	122,165	176,078
Percentage	10.0%	6.4%	9.2%
Candidate	Theodore Roosevelt	Robert M. La Follette
Home state	New York	Wisconsin
Delegate count	65	25
Contests won	1	2
Popular vote	80,019	133,426
Percentage	4.2%	6.9%
- Hughes Weeks Root Cummins Burton; Fairbanks Roosevelt La Follette Various (Note: California, Massachusetts, New Hampshire, and New York elected uncommitted slates of electors. Favorite sons won the popular vote in Michigan (Henry Ford), Illinois Lawrence Yates Sherman, and Pennsylvania (Martin Brumbaugh).) (Note: Favorite sons won the support of Michigan (Henry Ford), Illinois Lawrence Yates Sherman, and Pennsylvania (Martin Brumbaugh). Former President William Howard Taft carried the state of Texas.)
Previous Republican nominee
William Howard Taft
Republican nominee
Charles Evans Hughes

From February 9 to June 6, through a series of primaries and caucuses, voters of the Republican Party elected delegates to the 1916 Republican National Convention, held June 7 to June 10, 1916, in Chicago, Illinois to choose the party's nominee for President of the United States. The delegate election process was inconclusive, with a large majority of delegates not pledged to any candidate and a small plurality supporting Associate Justice of the Supreme Court Charles Evans Hughes. Hughes eventually secured the nomination at the convention on the third ballot.

Several more conservative or progressive candidates received a large share of elected delegates. Conservatives split between Senator John W. Weeks, Senator Elihu Root, and former Vice President Charles W. Fairbanks. Progressives rallied behind Senator Albert Cummins, who dominated the primaries, Senator Robert M. La Follette, and former President Theodore Roosevelt, who returned to the party after fatally splitting it in the 1912 election. Neither faction consolidated behind any one candidate, and the moderate Hughes, acceptable to all parties, prevailed.

== Background ==
=== 1912 presidential election ===
The 1912 presidential election was an epochal disaster for the Republican Party, which had won eleven of the previous thirteen elections, a period of dominance only interrupted by the two non-consecutive terms of Grover Cleveland and unequaled before or since in the history of the United States. Former President Theodore Roosevelt challenged William Howard Taft for the Republican nomination, dissatisfied with his successor's policies and encouraged by a groundswell of popular support. Despite this support, Roosevelt was unable to crack Taft's hold over the convention and caucus systems by which most delegates were selected and, declaring the nomination illegitimate, broke off to form the Progressive Party. With the Republicans split between Roosevelt and Taft, Democratic nominee Woodrow Wilson easily won a landslide election, albeit with a plurality of the vote.

=== 1914 midterms ===
The 1914 midterm elections were a disappointment for the Republicans; the Democratic Party retained control of both chambers for the first time since the American Civil War. Republicans were partly damaged by the passage of the Seventeenth Amendment to the United States Constitution, which required the direct popular election of United States Senators for the first time (despite opposition from many Republicans), and the continued presence of the Progressive Party.

The Democratic majority in the Senate was expanded to 56 seats, in many cases by a plurality, mirroring President Wilson's. In California, Colorado, Indiana, and Oregon, the Progressive vote more than accounted for the margin of Democratic victory.

The Progressive Party itself fared far worse. Only California, where Republican governor Hiram Johnson was re-elected on the Progressive ticket, presented any success whatsoever. The party's national vote was cut in half without Roosevelt to lead its ticket.

=== World War I ===
In July 1914, war broke out in Europe. At the start, Americans remained aloof from the conflict, even as naval warfare interrupted transatlantic shipping. News of German atrocities in Belgium did elicit support for the Allied side but did not alter the general national stance of neutrality.

Within the Republican Party, views of the war were mixed:

- Anglophiles, especially Eastern elites like Roosevelt and Senator Elihu Root, vigorously backed the Preparedness Movement and called for unambiguous support for Britain.
- Isolationists, especially Midwesterners and Westerners like Senators Robert M. La Follette and Albert Cummins, saw the war as irrelevant or hazardous to American interests.
- Internationalists such as A. Lawrence Lowell and Taft joined President Wilson in favoring the establishment of American-led institutions for arbitration to end the war.

After the sinking of the RMS Lusitania in May 1915, American public opinion turned decisively in favor of the Allied forces. Wilson's tepid response, which did not mention the Lusitania by name or threaten any retaliatory action, enraged Republican interventionists. Nevertheless, the mood of the country was "overwhelming antiwar," and Wilson won praise for his efforts to avoid war through strength. Theodore Roosevelt privately believed that Wilson's re-election was guaranteed by his policy of "waging peace."

=== Theodore Roosevelt and Progressive reconciliation ===
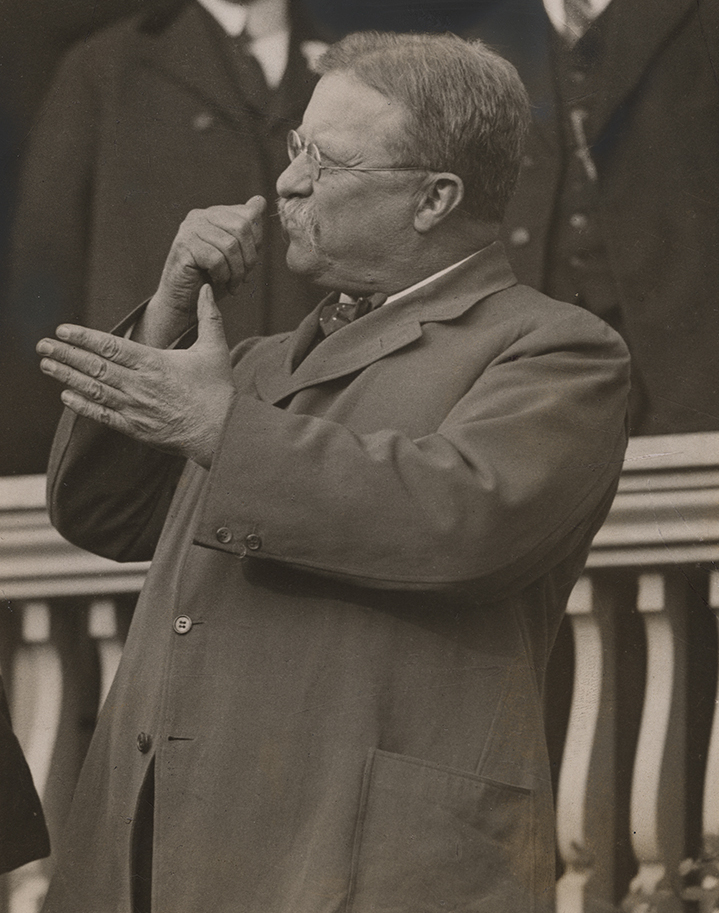
Former President Theodore Roosevelt delivers a speech in 1916. Much of the pre-primary speculation centered on whether or not Roosevelt would rejoin his former party or keep it divided.

Entering the 1916 election, Republicans were aware that the greatest threat to victory was the continued opposition of the Progressive Party, and in particular Theodore Roosevelt, who remained immensely popular. Although he still harbored antipathy for the Republican Party's political bosses, who he believed had stolen his rightful nomination in 1912, both Roosevelt's personal enmity and the Progressive Party organization had weakened by 1914.

Upon Roosevelt's May 1914 return from his lengthy South American expedition, he affirmatively declined to speculate as to politics. He declined to run for Governor of New York that summer and instead endorsed moderate Harvey D. Hinman for the Republican nomination, in hopes that his Progressive Party would be able to cross-endorse the Republican nominee. Hinman lost the primary to Charles S. Whitman, but Progressives still endorsed Whitman for Governor.

After the Progressive defeats in 1914, Roosevelt became despondent and entered what he referred to as the "very nadir" of his life. He focused his writing in magazines, journals, and a twelve-chapter book, America and the World War, on criticizing the Wilson administration for neutrality. Much of his time was devoted to defending a libel suit brought by William Barnes Jr. In January 1916, Republicans and Progressives negotiated the possibility of fusion in the upcoming election. Roosevelt was floated as a Republican candidate in February, as he took more conservative stances on corporatism and wealth.

== Procedure ==
After 1912, several more states adopted direct primary systems, which were expected to favor progressives, or informal advisory primaries. Nearly all of the Northern United States permitted a public vote on the presidential nomination, with Iowa, Indiana, Michigan, Minnesota, New Hampshire, Montana, West Virginia adopting the practice between 1912 and 1916.

Nevertheless, the entire South, most of the Rocky Mountain states, and Maine, Connecticut, Rhode Island, and Washington maintained the use of closed delegate conventions or caucuses, which tended to favor conservatives.

== Candidates ==
=== Nominee ===
Candidate	Most recent position	Home state	Campaign	Popular vote	Contests won
Charles Evans Hughes	Associate Justice of the Supreme Court of the United States (1910–1916)	New York	Nominated at convention: June 10, 1916	—	AL, AK, AR, CA, CT, ID, FL, KS, LA, ME, MD, MS, MO, NJ, NM, TN, UT, VT, VA, WY [data missing]

=== Withdrew during convention ===
Candidate	Most recent position	Home state	Campaign	Popular vote	Contests won
John W. Weeks	U.S. Senator from Massachusetts (1913–1919)	Massachusetts	Defeated at convention: June 10, 1916	—	AK, AR, GA, HI, MA, NH, NM, OK, SC [data missing]
Elihu Root	U.S. Senator from New York (1909–1915)	New York	Defeated at convention: June 10, 1916	—	AR, CT, NJ, NY, WA [data missing]
Theodore Roosevelt	President of the United States (1901–1909)	New York	(Positions); Defeated at convention: June 10, 1916	80,019 (4.2%)	CO, ID, NJ*, NC [data missing]
Robert M. La Follette	U.S. Senator from Wisconsin (1906–1925)	Wisconsin	Defeated at convention: June 10, 1916	133,426 (6.9%)	ND, WI [data missing]
Albert B. Cummins	U.S. Senator from Iowa (1908–1926)	Iowa	Defeated at convention: June 10, 1916	191,950 (10.0%)	IA, MN, NM, ND, MT, SD [data missing]
Theodore Burton	U.S. Senator from Ohio (1909–1915)	Ohio	Defeated at convention: June 10, 1916	122,165 (6.4%)	HI, OH, WV [data missing]
Charles Fairbanks	Vice President of the United States (1905–1909)	Indiana	Defeated at convention: June 10, 1916 (nominated for vice president)	176,078 (9.2%)	IN, KY [data missing]

=== Favorite sons ===
The following candidates entered only their home state's delegate selection contest for the purpose of controlling those delegates at the national convention:

- Governor Martin G. Brumbaugh of Pennsylvania
- Senator Lawrence Y. Sherman from Illinois
- Industrialist and peace activist Henry Ford of Michigan

=== Declined ===
- Senator William E. Borah of Idaho
- Governor Hiram Johnson of California (Progressive)
- Senator Henry Cabot Lodge of Massachusetts
- Former President William Howard Taft of Ohio
- Governor Charles S. Whitman of New York

== Schedule and results ==
Date	Total pledged delegates	Contest and total popular vote	Delegates won and popular vote (Note: These results are not complete and may not reflect accurate final totals. Only candidates whose names were entered in multiple state delegate elections are listed here. Write-in candidates are in italics.)							
Date	Total pledged delegates	Contest and total popular vote	Unpledged	Albert Cummins	Theodore Roosevelt	C. E. Hughes	Theodore Burton	Charles Fairbanks	Robert La Follette	Others
February 9	8	Florida convention	8	–	–	–	–	–	–	–
March 1	21	North Carolina convention	21	–	–	–	–	–	–	–
March 2	26	Kentucky convention	–	–	–	–	–	26	–	–
March 7	30	Indiana primary 176,224	–	–	–	–	–	30; 176,224 (100.0%)	–	–
March 7	11	South Carolina convention	11	–	–	–	–	–	–	–
March 14	24	Minnesota primary 70,617	16,403 (23.2%) (Note: Includes 12,693 votes for Henry Estabrook and 3,710 votes for William Grant Webster.)	24; 54,214 (76.8%)	–	–	–	–	–	–
March 14	8	New Hampshire primary 10,838	8; 7,850 (72.4%)	–	2,988 (27.6%)	–	–	–	–	–
March 21	10	North Dakota primary 33,225	9,851 (29.7%) (Note: All votes attributed to Henry Estabrook.)	–	–	–	–	–	10; 23,374 (70.3%)	–
March 22	20	Kansas convention	20	–	–	–	–	–	–	–
March 23	12	Maine convention	12 (Note: The Maine delegates were formally uninstructed but considered favorable to Hughes.)	–	–	–	–	–	–	–
March 23	20	Oklahoma convention	20	–	–	–	–	–	–	–
March 29	12	Louisiana convention	12	–	–	–	–	–	–	–
March 30	15	Virginia convention	15	–	–	–	–	–	–	–
April 3	30	Michigan primary 176,671	–	–	1,074 (0.6%)	303 (0.2%)	–	–	–	30 (Note: All thirty delegates were pledged to support the winner of the popular primary, Henry Ford.); 175,384 (99.2%) (Note: Includes 83,057 votes for Henry Ford, 77,872 votes for William Alden Smith and 14,365 votes for William Simpson.)
April 4	87	New York primary	87 (Note: A single list of candidates was named by the New York Republican Party. The vote count has not been reported in detail.)	–	–	–	–	–	–	–
April 4	26	Wisconsin primaries 111,399	11 (Note: Emanuel Philipp led a slate of at-large delegates opposed to La Follette, but he was the only candidate from his slate elected at-large. La Follette candidates carried three at-large delegate spots and the majority of the district delegates.)	–	–	–	–	–	15; 110,052 (98.8%)	–
April 7	36	Missouri convention	36	–	–	–	–	–	–	–
April 10	26	Iowa primary 44,288	–	26; 40,157 (90.7%)	2,348 (5.3%)	1,270 (2.87%)	–	–	–	513 (1.2%) (Note: Includes 512 write-in votes for Elihu Root and one write-in vote for Henry Ford.)
April 11	58	Illinois primaries 176,671 (Note: Returns are incomplete; the official canvass published in May did not include Harlan's vote.)	–	–	2; 15,348 (8.9%)	1,078 (0.6%)	–	–	49 (0.0%)	56; 156,478 (90.5%) (Note: Includes 155, votes cast for Lawrence Y. Sherman, 447 write-in votes cast for Elihu Root, 50 write-in votes for William Howard Taft, 20 write-in votes for John Maynard Harlan, and 16 write-in votes for James Mann.)
April 12	6	Delaware convention	–	–	–	–	–	–	–	6 (Note: All six Delaware delegates were pledged to support Pierre S. du Pont.)
April 12	17	Georgia convention	17	–	–	–	–	–	–	–
April 13	14	Connecticut convention	14	–	–	–	–	–	–	–
April 17	10	Rhode Island convention	10	–	–	–	–	–	–	–
April 18	16	Nebraska primary 88,607	13,770 (15.5%) (Note: Includes 8,132 votes for Henry Estabrook and 5,506 votes for Robert G. Ross.)	14; 29,850 (33.7%)	2,256 (2.5%)	15,837 (17.87%)	–	–	10 (0.0%)	2; 26,884 (30.3%) (Note: All votes cast for Henry Ford.)
April 19	2	Alaska Territory convention	2	–	–	–	–	–	–	–
April 21	8	Idaho convention	8	–	–	–	–	–	–	–
April 21	8	Montana primary 14,194	382 (2.7%)	8; 10,415 (73.4%)	2,635 (18.6%)	564 (4.0%)	–	–	64 (0.4%)	134 (0.9%) (Note: Includes 134 write-in votes for Henry Ford.)
April 25	36	Massachusetts primary 108,969	36; 62,763 (57.6%) (Note: All votes for an unpledged slate of delegates.)	–	46,206 (42.4%)	–	–	–	–	–
April 25	28	New Jersey primaries 1,764	26	–	2; 1,084 (61.5%)	393 (22.3%)	–	–	–	196 (11.1%) (Note: Includes 47 write-in votes for Elihu Root, 47 write-in votes for Woodrow Wilson, 31 write-in votes for William Howard Taft and 10 write-in votes for William Hughes.}})
April 25	48	Ohio primary 140,682	–	–	1,932 (1.4%)	469 (0.3%)	48; 122,165 (86.8%)	–	–	14,433 (11.5%) (Note: Includes 14,217 votes for William Grant Webster, 1,683 write-in votes for Henry Ford and 211 write-in votes for Warren G. Harding.)
April 27	15	Arkansas convention	15	–	–	–	–	–	–	–
April 27	6	New Mexico convention	6	–	–	–	–	–	–	–
May 1	12	Mississippi convention	12	–	–	–	–	–	–	–
May 2	26	California primary 229,349	26; 229,349 (100.0%) (Note: Two uncommitted slates ran in the California primary: "Regulars" opposed any alliance with the Progressive Party and "United-Republicans" supporting such an alliance and actively supported by Hiram Johnson. The Regulars won 132,836 votes and the United-Republican slate won 96,513 votes.)	–	–	–	–	–	–	–
May 2	8	Utah convention	8	–	–	–	–	–	–	–
May 3	12	Colorado convention	12	–	–	–	–	–	–	–
May 4	21	Tennessee convention	21	–	–	–	–	–	–	–
May 5	16	West Virginia convention	16	–	–	–	–	–	–	–
May 6	6	Arizona convention	6	–	–	–	–	–	–	–
May 6	14	Washington convention	14	–	–	–	–	–	–	–
May 8	6	Wyoming convention	6	–	–	–	–	–	–	–
May 9	16	Maryland convention	16	–	–	–	–	–	–	–
May 16	72	Pennsylvania primaries 270,195	55	–	12,359 (4.6%)	1,804 (0.67%)	–	–	–	17 (Note: Under Pennsylvania law, seventeen of the elected delegates were pledged to support the primary winner.); 254,506 (95.4%) (Note: Includes 233,095 votes for Martin Brumbaugh, 20,255 write-in votes for Henry Ford, 774 write-in votes for Joseph R. Grundy and 382 write-in votes for Philander Knox.)
May 16	0 (of 8)	Vermont primary 7,834	–	–	1,931 (24.6%)	5,480 (70.0%)	–	–	–	423 (5.4%) (Note: Includes 181 write-in votes for Samuel W. McCall, 180 write-in votes for Elihu Root, 34 write-in votes for Henry Ford and 28 write-in votes for John W. Weeks.)
May 19	10	Oregon primary 94,915	–	27,558 (29.0%)	–	10; 56,764 (59.8%)	10,593 (11.2%)	–	–	–
May 20	16	Alabama convention	16	–	–	–	–	–	–	–
May 23	10	South Dakota primary 29,656	–	10; 29,656 (100.0%)	–	–	–	–	–	–
May 24	26	Texas convention	26	–	–	–	–	–	–	–
May 26	8	Vermont convention	–	–	–	8	–	–	–	–
June 6	0 (of 16)	West Virginia primary 18,685 (Note: Partial Returns from 1,081 out of 1,730 precincts.)	2,862 (15.3%) (Note: All votes for William Grant Webster.)	–	–	–	15,823 (84.7%)	–	–	–
June 7	Pledged Delegates		629	82	4	18	48	56	25	126
June 7	Delegate Estimates		144	89	60	224	70	65	36	239 (Note: Includes 82 delegates supporting Elihu Root, 56 delegates supporting Lawrence Y. Sherman, 54 delegates supporting John W. Weeks, 40 delegates supporting Philander S. Knox, 38 delegates supporting Henry Ford, 19 delegates supporting Martin Brumbaugh, and 6 delegates supporting Pierre S. du Pont.)

== Campaign ==
Delegate selections began as early as March.

Early in the campaign, Theodore Roosevelt attempted to dampen widespread hopes that he would accept a joint Republican and Progressive nomination. On March 9, he issued a statement to the press insisting that his name "not be brought into the Massachusetts primaries" and "emphatically" declining to be a candidate. However, he declined to issue a Shermanesque statement and declared that his nomination would be a mistake "unless the country had in its mood something of the heroic." The New York Times reported the statement under the headline "ROOSEVELT'S HAT AGAIN IN THE RING."

While Roosevelt's support came largely from outside the Republican Party establishment, party loyalists attempted to recruit a candidate who would be acceptable to Progressives, or at least pacify Roosevelt. Their first choice was Charles Evans Hughes. Hughes, as Associate Justice of the Supreme Court, had the virtue of making few statements on political issues; even as an active politician, he had a character for reticence. He also had a reputation for progressivism as Governor of New York. When Roosevelt returned from the Caribbean in late March, he found two presidential booms underway: one for himself and one for Hughes. Roosevelt privately feared Hughes would merely be "Wilson with whiskers." However, Hughes was adamant that he was not a candidate; he had refused consideration in 1912 and had even stopped voting since joining the Court. "It seems to me very clear that, as a member of the Supreme Court, I have no right to be a candidate, either actively or passively," he wrote to New Jersey governor Edward C. Stokes.

"I am torn between two profound desires: one to keep the judicial ermine unsullied and the other not to fail in meeting what might be a duty to the country."

— Charles Evans Hughes

On March 31, Roosevelt made his first overt move toward a return to the Republican Party by lunching with Elihu Root, who as president of the 1912 Republican National Convention had been the focus of Roosevelt's tirades for four years. With Wilson apparently vulnerable once more following Pancho Villa's attack on United States soil, Roosevelt appeared to be holding himself out for the nomination. However, Root himself had presidential ambitions as well.

Despite his denials, supporters entered Hughes's name in the April Nebraska primary. Hughes responded by threatening legal action to keep his name off the state ballot; nevertheless, the media and party supporters continued to trumpet Hughes as a candidate. He was finally persuaded by a letter from former President Taft, who argued that Hughes was the only man who could united the Progressives and Republicans and defeat Wilson. Taft wrote, "Your opportunity as President to guide the country through the trial bound to come after the war will be as great as Washington's or Lincoln's. You are equal to it. Strong men will respond to your call because you are yourself so satisfying in strength and in your political courage and patriotism." Sufficiently flattered, Hughes consulted with his colleagues Willis Van Devanter and Edward Douglass White; both urged him to accept if nominated.

Meanwhile, Roosevelt campaign committees and headquarters were soon established across the country. Roosevelt himself confided to Hiram Johnson that his true ambition was to "get the Republicans and Progressive together for someone whom we can elect and whom it will be worth electing." Privately, he believed that was Hughes, but held on to the ambition that he would be drafted by the delegates. Roosevelt's support faded after President Wilson took a stronger rhetorical stance against Germany.

=== May: Hughes in front ===
As the convention approached, Hughes began to receive intimations from Chief Justice White and Interior Secretary Franklin Lane that Wilson planned to appoint him as Chief Justice on White's retirement. Hughes responded that he would not allow the offer to affect his decision; he may have resolved to accept the nomination rather than be implicated in an apparent quid pro quo with Wilson. As the campaign came to a close, Hughes polled as the first choice of many Republican voters. He won the May primaries in Vermont (over Roosevelt) and Oregon (over Cummins) by wide margins. Frank Harris Hitchcock and Eugene Meyer, who managed the Hughes boom, found little trouble winning commitments from independent delegates to vote for Hughes.

=== Pre-convention maneuvering ===
On June 8, as the Republican and Progressive parties each convened in Chicago, leaders of the two met privately to discuss a compromise candidate. The Progressives made clear that the only acceptable name was Roosevelt; Republicans balked and resolved to risk a split by nominating Hughes or a more conservative man.

== See also ==
- 1916 Democratic Party presidential primaries
