= 1916 Democratic Party presidential primaries =

← 1912	March 7 to June 6, 1916	1920 →
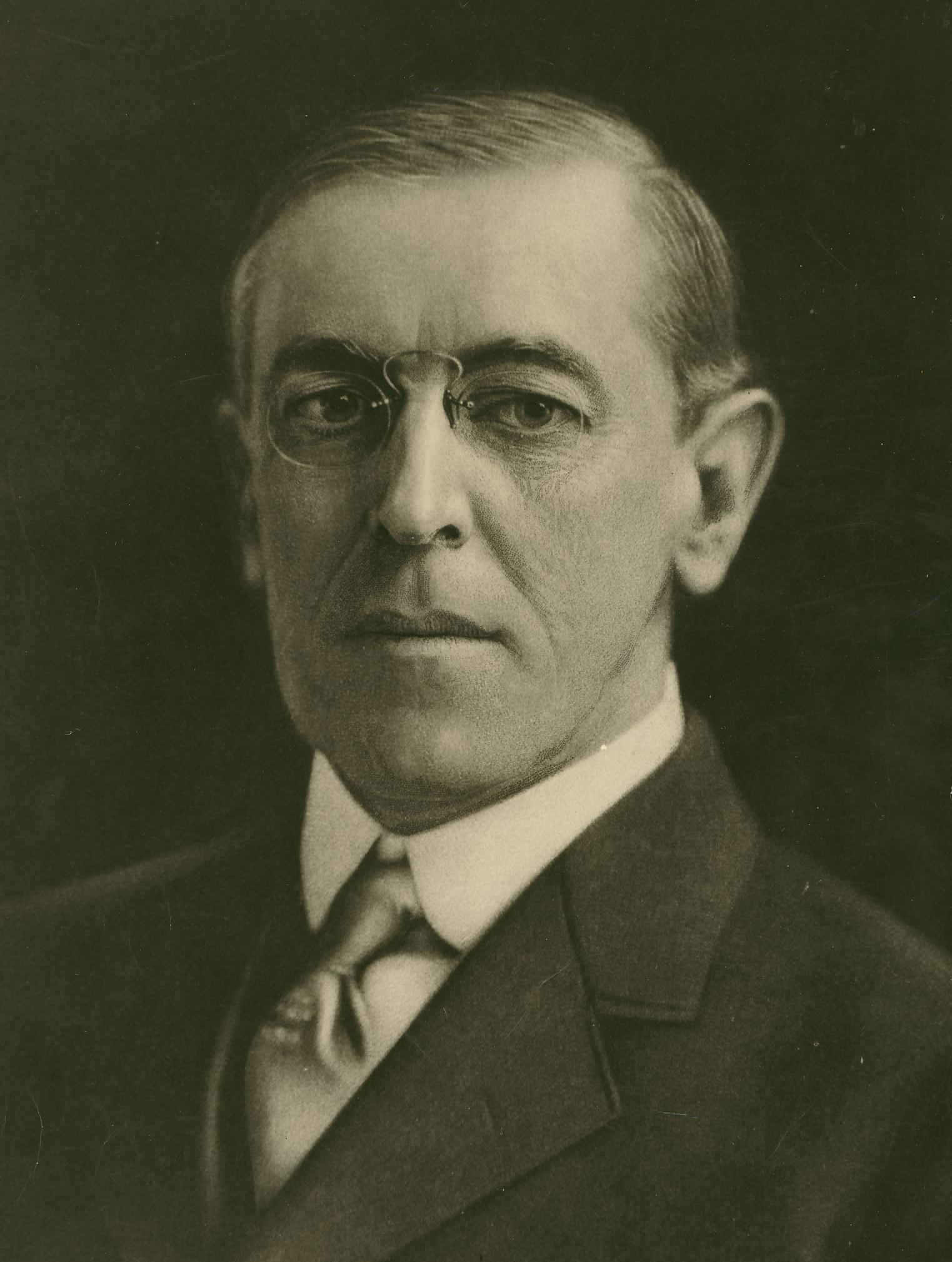
Nominee	Woodrow Wilson
Home state	New Jersey
Contests won	21
Popular vote	1,202,492
Percentage	98.66%
- Wilson; First place by popular vote
Previous Democratic nominee
Woodrow Wilson
Democratic nominee
Woodrow Wilson

From March 7 to June 6, 1916, voters of the Democratic Party chose its nominee for president in the 1916 United States presidential election. Incumbent President Woodrow Wilson was selected as the nominee through a series of primary elections and caucuses culminating in the 1916 Democratic National Convention held from June 14 to June 16, 1916, in St. Louis, Missouri.

== Results ==
1916 Democratic primary results by county popular vote (Note: Those states with no recorded county results are shaded by their total popular vote percentage.) Wilson: Wilson—50–60%; Wilson—60–70%; Wilson—70–80%; Wilson—90–90%; Wilson—90–100%

State	Date	Woodrow Wilson	Robert G. Ross	Scattering
Indiana	March 7	160,423 (100.0%)
Minnesota	March 14	45,136 (100.0%)
New Hampshire	March 14	5,684 (100.0%)
North Dakota	March 21	45,136 (100%)
Michigan	April 3	84,972 (99.77%)		199 (0.23%) (Note: 124 ballots were cast for William Jennings Bryan, 55 for Henry Ford, and 20 for Theodore Roosevelt)
New York	April 4	112,538 (100.0%)
Wisconsin	April 4	109,462 (99.79%)		231 (0.21%) (Note: The people these votes are for is unknown.)
Illinois	April 11	136,839 (99.84%)		219 (0.16%) (Note: 173 ballots were cast for Champ Clark, 33 for William Jennings Bryan, and 13 for others.)
Nebraska	April 18	69,506 (87.71%)	9,417 (11.88%)	327 (0.16%) (Note: It is unknown who 290 ballots were cast for, but 37 were for William Jennings Bryan.)
Montana	April 21	17,960 (99.29%)		129 (0.71%) (Note: 88 ballots were cast for William Jennings Bryan, 41 for Champ Clark.)
Iowa	April 25	31,447 (97.83%)		698 (2.17%) (Note: 363 ballots were for Champ Clark, 149 for William Jennings Bryan, and 186 unknown votes.)
Massachusetts	April 25	20,209 (100.0%)
New Jersey	April 25	82,668 (97.16%)		63 (2.84%) (Note: 27 ballots were cast for Henry Ford, 10 for William Jennings Bryan, and the rest are unclear.)
Ohio	April 25	25,407 (99.75%)		2,416 (0.25%) (Note: 1,621 ballots were cast for Henry Ford, 621 for Champ Clark, 115 for William Jennings Bryan, 31 for Judson Harmon, 27 for James E. Campbell and 1 unknown vote.)
California	May 2	75,788 (100.0%)
Vermont	May 16	3,711 (99.38%)		23 (0.62%) (Note: All were cast for Champ Clark)
Pennsylvania	May 16	142,022 (98.72%)		1,840 (0.62%) (Note: 1,581 ballots were cast for Henry Ford, 49 for Theodore Roosevelt, 12 for William Jennings Bryan, and 198 for unknown candidates.)
Oregon	May 23	27,898 (100.0%)
South Dakota	May 19	10,341 (100.0%)
North Carolina	June 3	33,532 (99.94%)		19 (0.62%) (Note: 5 ballots were for William Jennings Bryan, 4 were for Champ Clark, 1 for Robert B. Glenn, and 9 unknown votes.)
West Virginia	June 6	30,000~ (95.24%)		1,500~ (4.76%) (Note: The total vote count for West Virginia is not fully known and had to be estimated from what is known.)

Legend:	1st place (popular vote)	2nd place (popular vote)	3rd place (popular vote)

== See also ==
- 1916 Republican Party presidential primaries
- White primary
