= 1916 Democratic National Convention =

U.S. political event held in St. Louis, Missouri

- 1916 presidential election
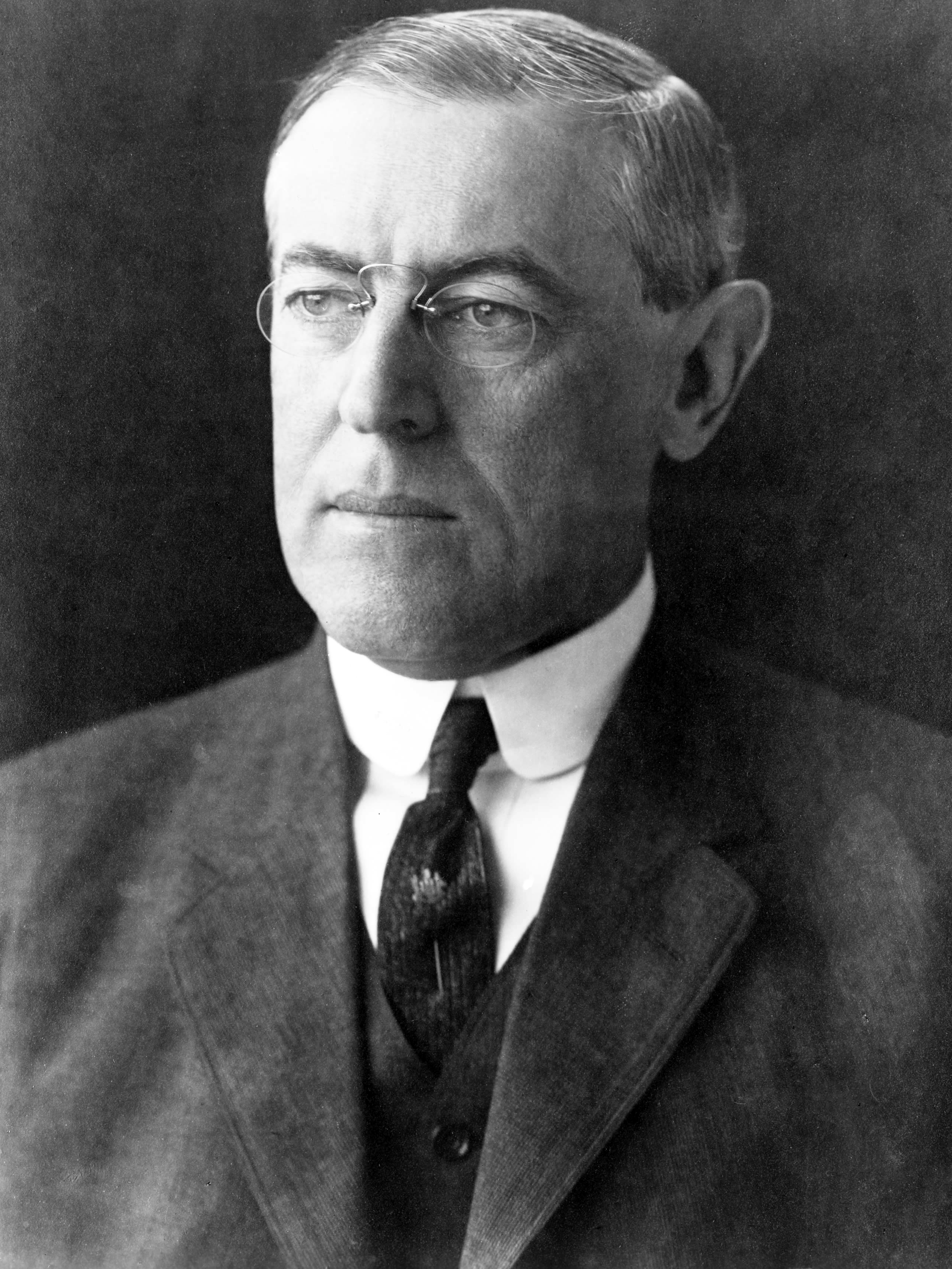
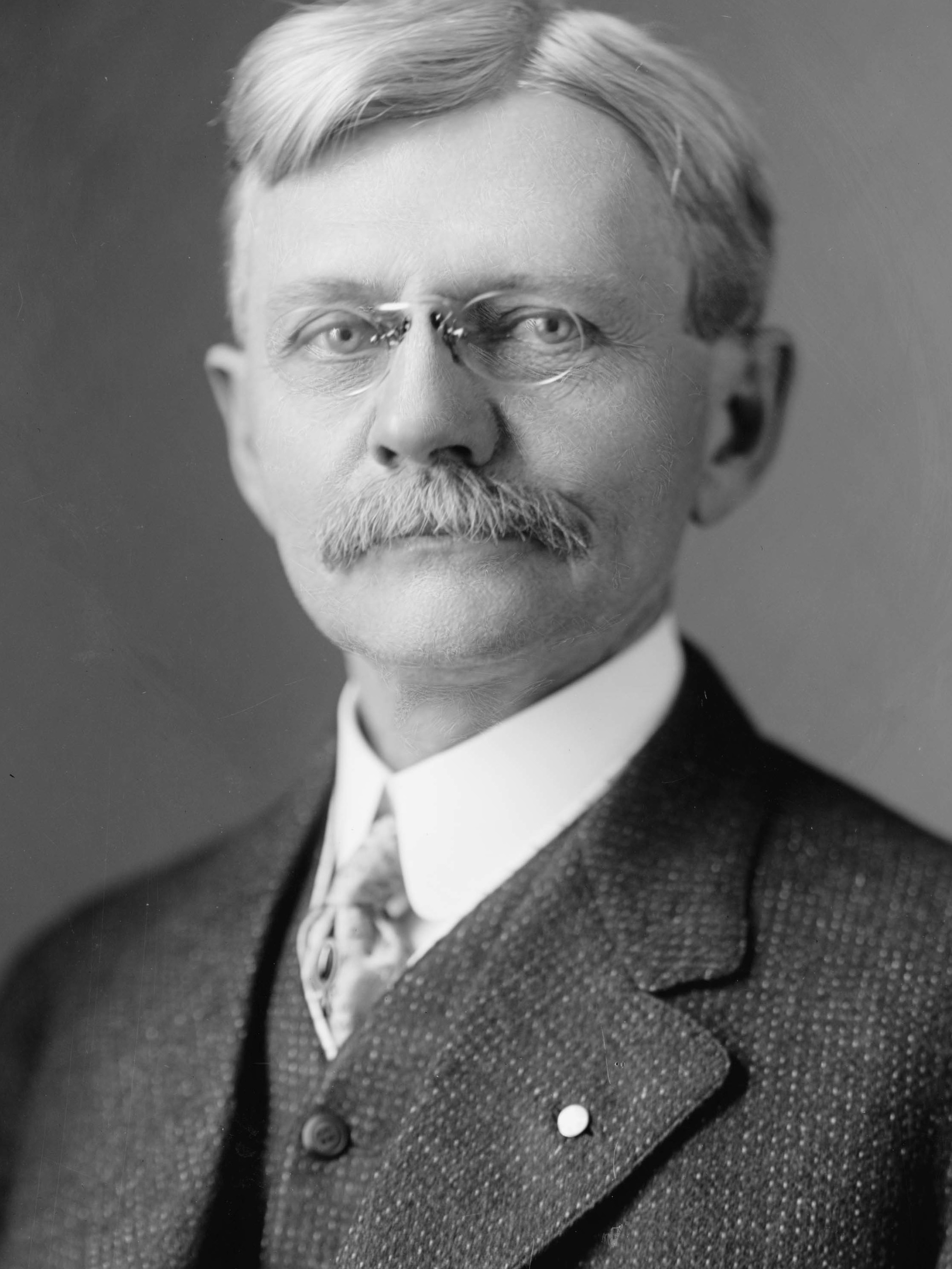
- Nominees; Wilson and Marshall

Convention
- Date(s): June 14–16, 1916
- City: St. Louis, Missouri, U.S.
- Venue: St. Louis Coliseum

Candidates
- Presidential nominee: Woodrow Wilson of New Jersey
- Vice-presidential nominee: Thomas R. Marshall of Indiana

The 1916 Democratic National Convention was held at the St. Louis Coliseum in St. Louis, Missouri from June 14 to June 16, 1916. It resulted in the nomination of President Woodrow Wilson and Vice President Thomas R. Marshall for reelection.

== Presidential nomination ==
=== Presidential candidates ===
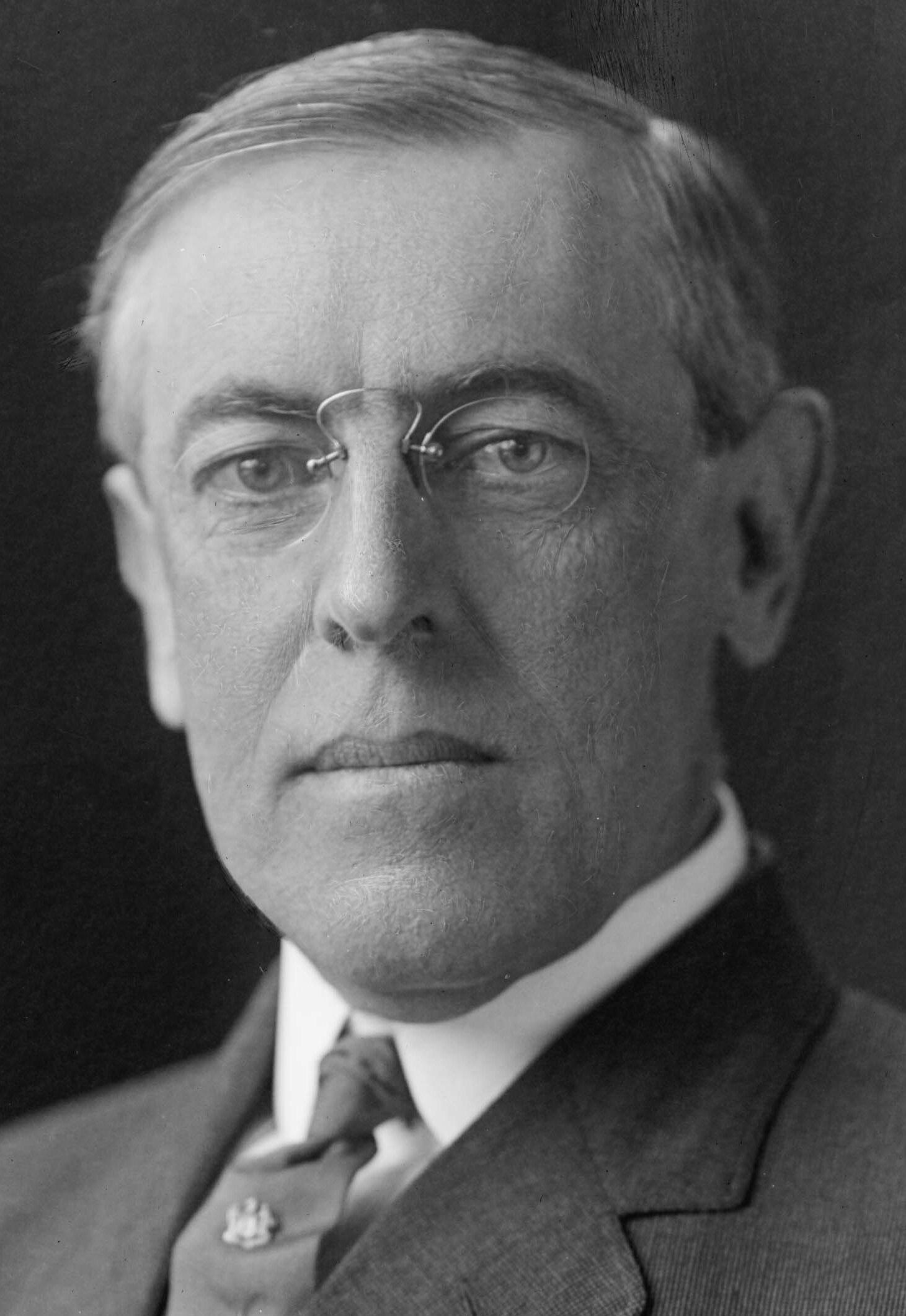
President
Woodrow Wilson
of New Jersey

Senator Hughes of New Jersey made the motion to suspend the rules and nominate Woodrow Wilson by acclamation. The motion was seconded in all parts of the house, but Robert Emmett Burke, the uninstructed delegate from Chicago, made a point of order and demanded a roll call. The point of order was not taken into account by Chairman James, who put the motion before the convention. He called for the "ayes" and there was a great shout. "Contraries," demanded Burke. Chairman James called for the "nays" and Burke voted "nay" in a loud voice. There was some hissing, but it was drowned by cheers when, at 11:54pm, Chairman James declared Woodrow Wilson nominated for president by the convention.

Presidential Nomination
Candidate	Voice Vote
Pro-Wilson	1,091
Anti-Wilson	1

Presidential Nomination / 2nd Day of Convention (June 15, 1916)

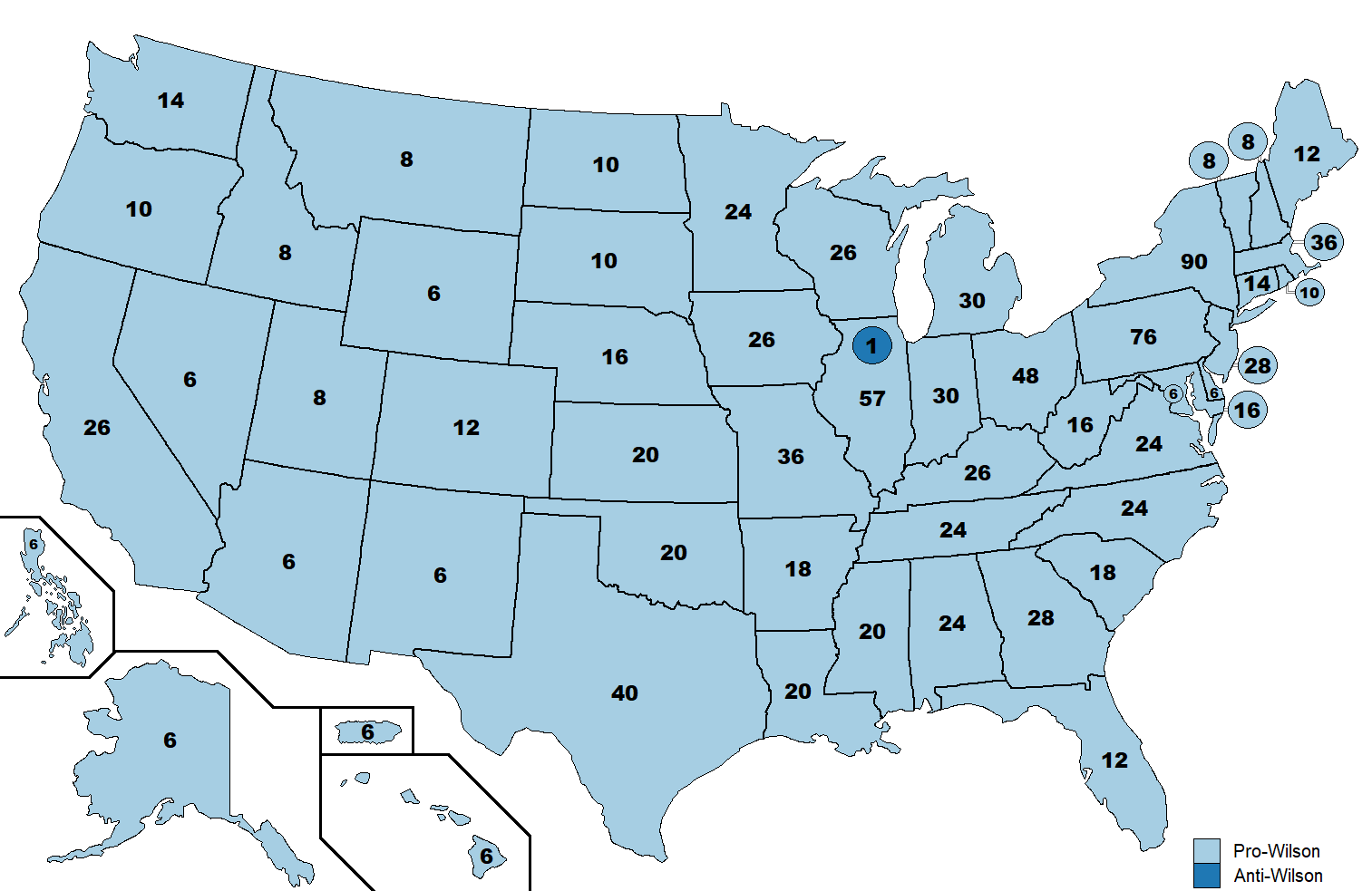
Presidential Nomination
(Voice Vote)

== Demonstrations ==
Women's suffrage activists in Missouri staged a demonstration for the convention. Suffragists Emily Newell Blair and Edna Gellhorn came up with the idea and organized a "walkless, talkless parade," also called the "Golden Lane." Around 3,000 suffragists lined twelve blocks of Locust Street in St. Louis, wearing white dresses, "votes for women" sashes and holding yellow umbrellas. Democratic delegates had to walk past the suffragists to reach the convention hall. The demonstration was meant to represent how women were silenced by not being allowed to vote and received national attention in the press. The Democratic delegates did decide to support women's suffrage on a state by state basis.

== Images ==
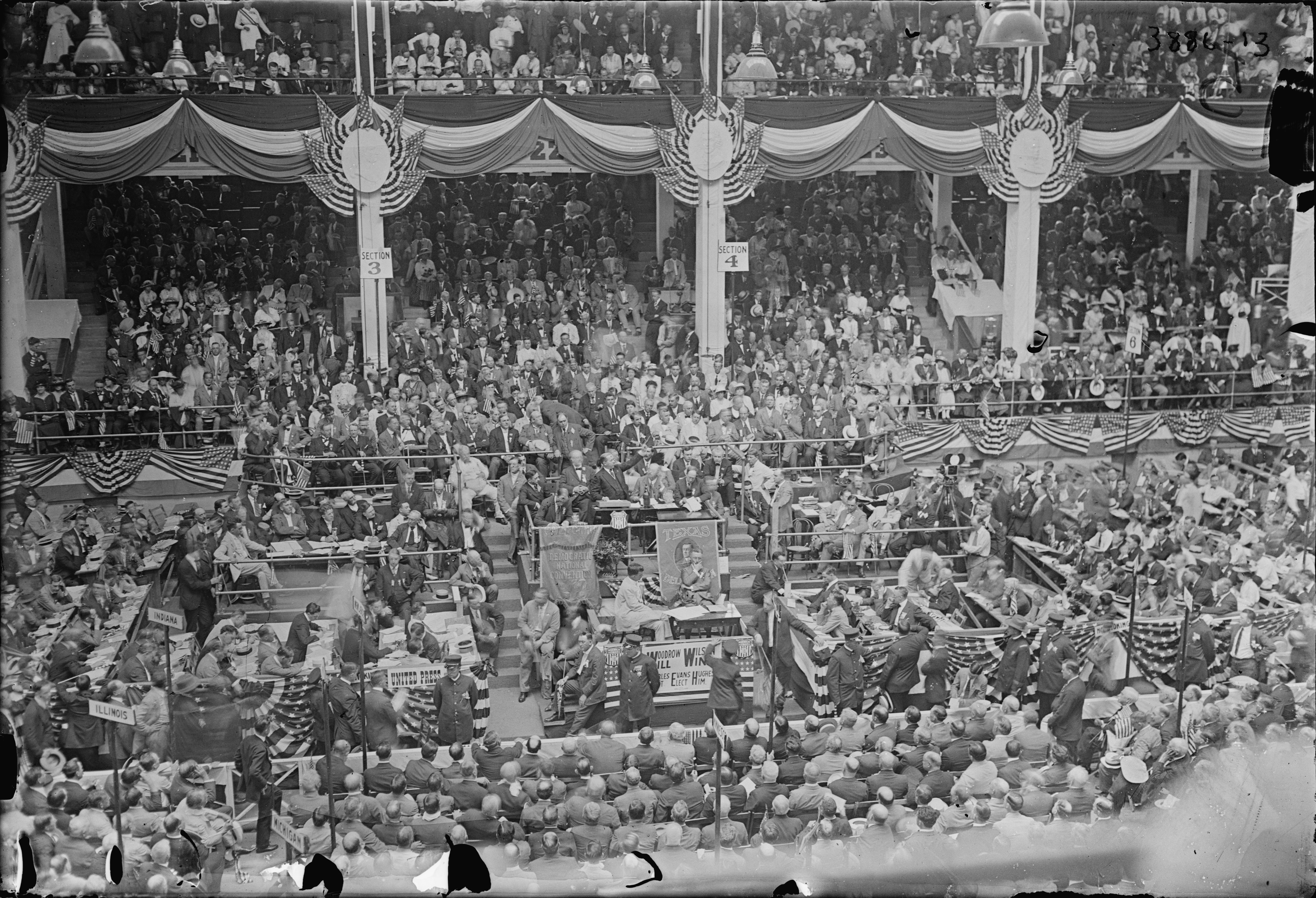

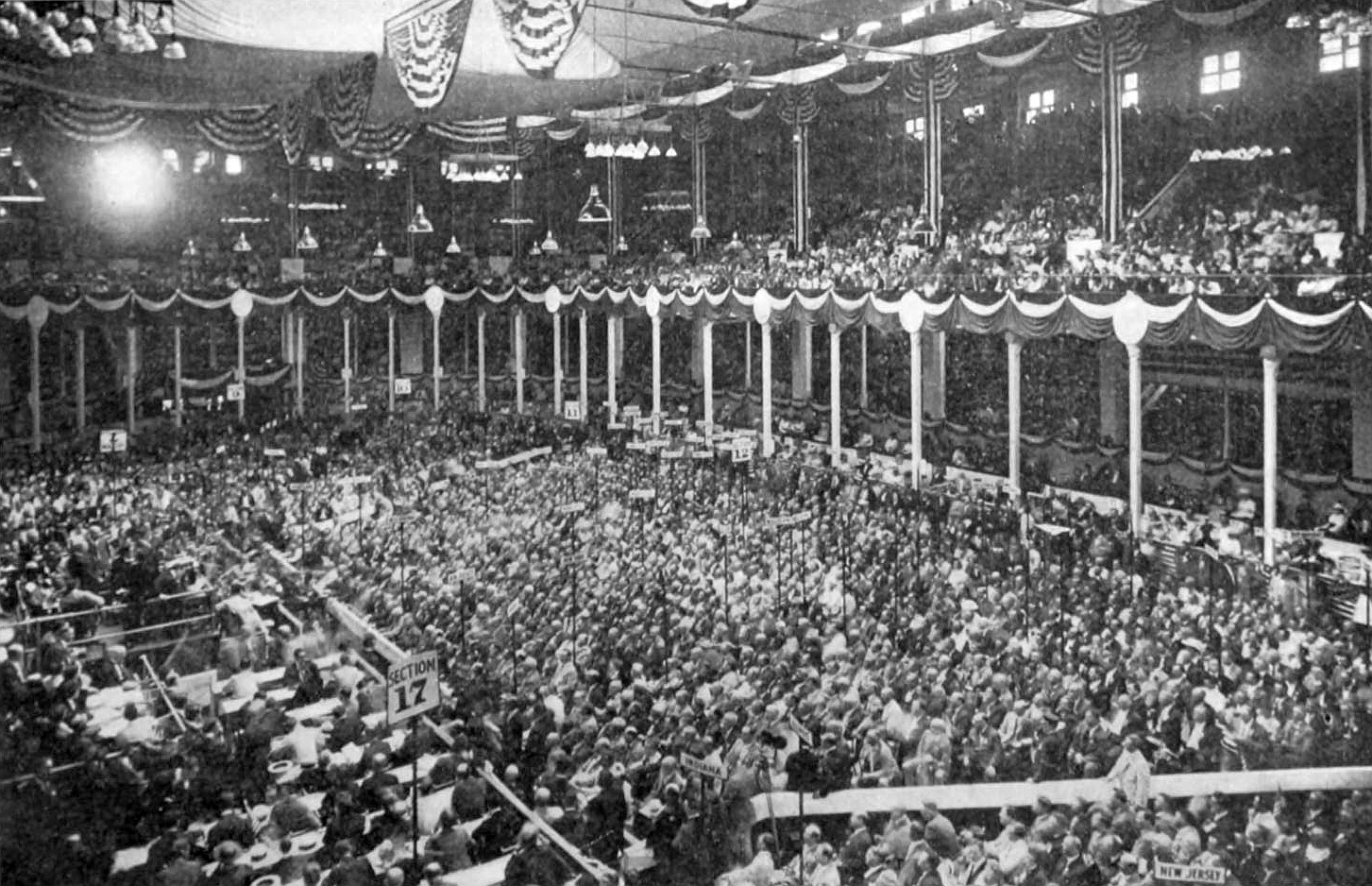

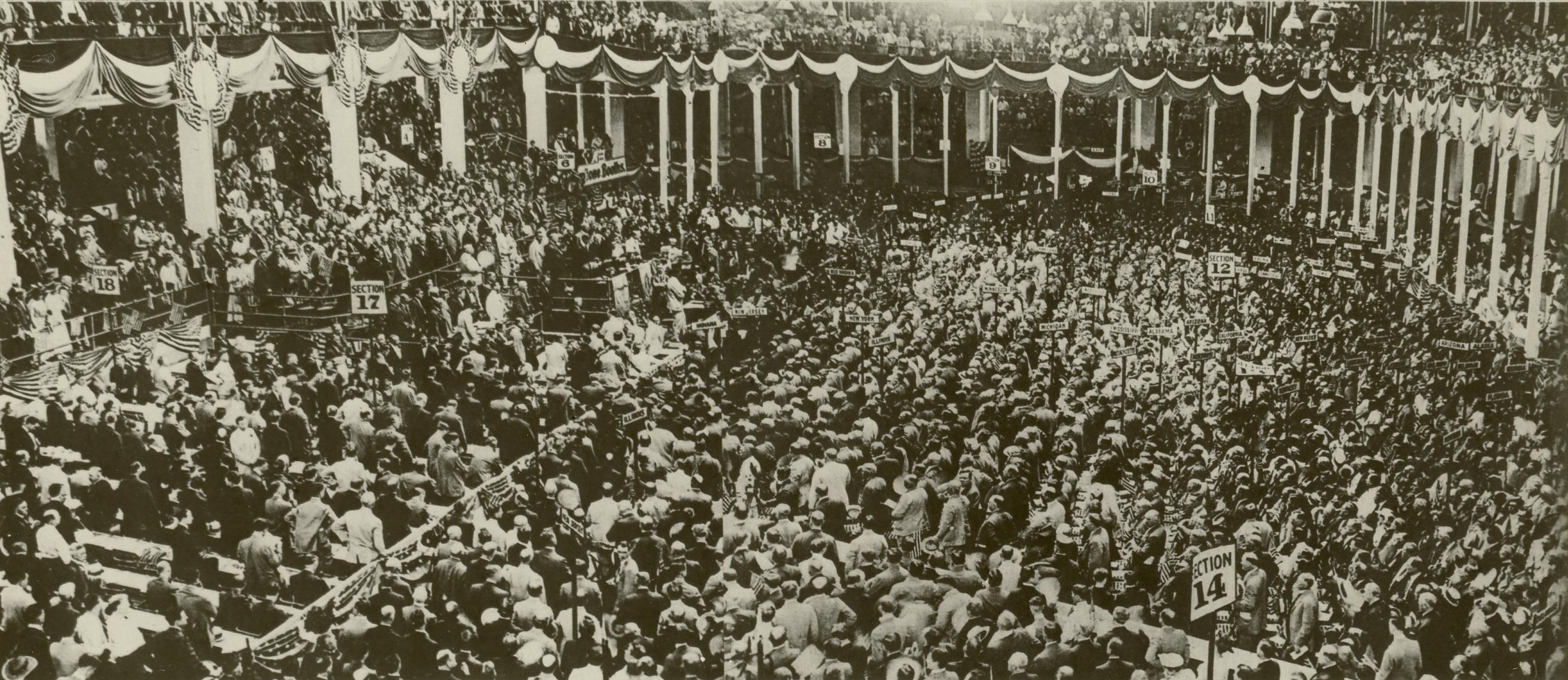

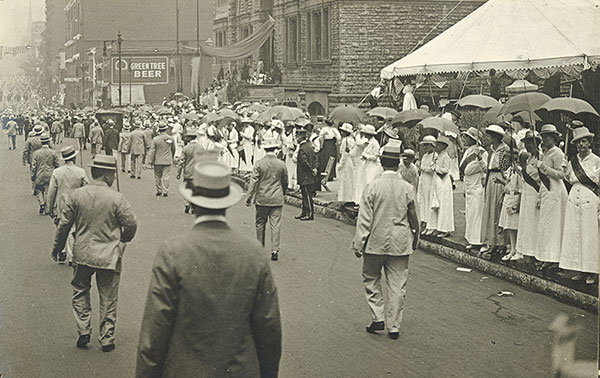

== See also ==
- 1916 Democratic Party presidential primaries
- List of Democratic National Conventions
- U.S. presidential nomination convention
- History of the United States Democratic Party
- 1916 Republican National Convention
- 1916 United States presidential election

Preceded by 1912; Baltimore, Maryland	Democratic National Conventions	Succeeded by 1920; San Francisco, California
