= Northeast Dubois County School Corporation =

School district in Indiana

Northeast Dubois County School Corporation is a school district in the northeast corner of Dubois County in southwestern Indiana.

The school corporation includes the townships of Columbia, Harbison, Hall, and Marion. There is one census-designated place in the district, Dubois. Additionally, the school district includes the unincorporated communities of Celestine, Crystal, Cuzco, Haysville, and Hillham.

It consists of one high school, Northeast Dubois High School, one middle school, Dubois Middle School and two elementary schools with a total enrollment of 1,012 students. Its certified staff count is 58. The current superintendent is Bill Hochgesang.

The corporation's vision is "Northeast Dubois - A Community Inspiring Tomorrow's Minds Today."
