= Indiana State Road 545 =

State highway in Indiana, United States

State Road 545

Route information
- Maintained by INDOT
- Length: 24.975 mi (40.193 km)

Southern segment
- Length: 13.916 mi (22.396 km)
- South end: SR 66 in Troy
- North end: SR 62 in St. Meinrad

Northern segment
- Length: 11.059 mi (17.798 km)
- South end: SR 164 in Celestine
- North end: SR 56 in Columbia Township

Location
- Country: United States
- State: Indiana

Highway system
- Indiana State Highway System; Interstate; US; State; Scenic
← SR 524	→ SR 550

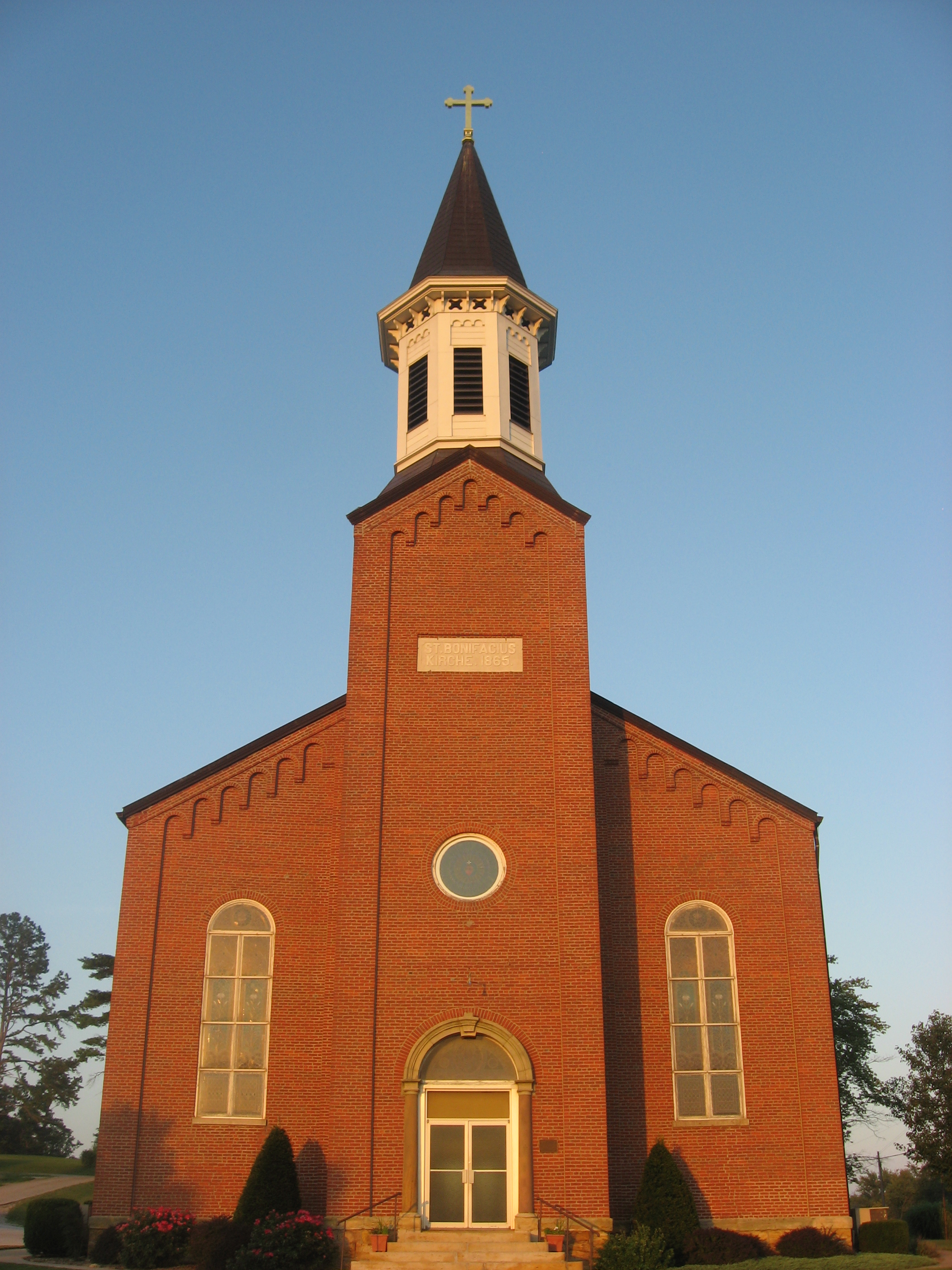
St. Boniface's Catholic Church, located along State Road 545 at Fulda

State Road 545 is a discontinuous route consisting of a northern section and a southern section.

The southern section connects State Road 66 (SR 66) at the town of Troy to State Road 62 in Saint Meinrad. This section is very scenic, winding and narrow.

The northern section connects State Road 164 (SR 164) with State Road 56 (SR 56) in eastern Dubois County, passing the town of Dubois.

== Route description ==
=== Southern section ===
From the southern terminus SR 545 heads north. Then SR 545 turns northeast towards Fulda. After Fulda, SR 545 heads northeast towards St. Meinrad.

=== Northern section ===
From the southern terminus of the northern section SR 545 heads northeast, then back northwest towards Dubois. From Dubois SR 545 heads due north towards SR 56. This section of the highway is named for Indiana State Representative Dennis Heeke, who lobbied for the extension of the route from the town of Dubois south to SR 164.

== Major intersections ==
County	Location	mi	km	Destinations	Notes
Perry	Troy	0.000	0.000	SR 66	Southern terminus of SR 545
Spencer	Huff Township	13.916	22.396	SR 62	Northern terminus of the southern terminus of SR 545
Gap in route
Dubois	Celestine	13.917	22.397	SR 164 – Wickliffe, Jasper	Southern terminus of the northern section of SR 545
Dubois	Columbia Township	24.975	40.193	SR 56 – French Lick, Haysville	Northern terminus of SR 545
1.000 mi = 1.609 km; 1.000 km = 0.621 mi
