= List of public art in Dubois County, Indiana =

This is a list of public art in Dubois County, Indiana.

This list applies only to works of public art accessible in an outdoor public space. For example, this does not include artwork visible inside a museum.

Most of the works mentioned are sculptures. When this is not the case (e.g., sound installation,) it is stated next to the title.

== Ferdinand ==
Title	Artist	Year	Location/GPS Coordinates	Material	Dimensions	Owner	Image
Christ the Victor	Herbert Jogerst	ca. 1950	St. Ferdinand Church 38°13′24.34″N 86°51′39.96″W	Concrete	Figure: approx. 9 ft. x 33 in. x 22 in.	St. Ferdinand Church	
Crucifix	C. Zuckriegel	1880	St. Ferdinand Church	Limestone	Approx. 8 ft. x 4 ft. x 16 in.	St. Ferdinand Church	
Crucifix	C. Zuckriegel	1892	Monastery of the Immaculate Conception	Limestone	Sculpture: approx. 6 1/2 ft. x 39 in. x 11 in.	Sisters of St. Benedict	
Our Lady of Fatima	Unknown	1952	St. Ferdinand Church	Marble	4 figures. Mary: approx. 9 x 33 x 21 in.; Each child figure: approx. 37 x 15 x 16 in.	St. Ferdinand Church	
St. Henry	Unknown		St. Henry Church	Limestone	Approx. 7 x 3 x 2 1/2 ft.	St. Henry Church	

== Celestine ==
Title	Artist	Year	Location/GPS Coordinates	Material	Dimensions	Owner	Image
Crucifixion	Unknown	1928	St. Peter and Paul Cemetery	Concrete	Sculpture: approx. 11 ft. x 86 in. x 2 ft.	St. Celestine Church	

== Huntingburg ==
Title	Artist	Year	Location/GPS Coordinates	Material	Dimensions	Owner	Image
Mary Queen of Heaven	Unknown		St. Mary's School		Approx. 5 x 2 1/2 x 2 ft.	St. Mary's School	
St. Jude	Unknown	1980	St. Mary's School	Marble	Figure: approx. 5 ft. x 20 in. x 14 in.	St. Mary's School	

== Ireland ==
Title	Artist	Year	Location/GPS Coordinates	Material	Dimensions	Owner	Image
Crucifixion	Unknown	ca. 1920	St. Mary Church	Fiberglass & Limestone	Sculpture: approx. 12 ft. x 6 1/2 ft. x 26 in.	St. Mary Church	
Mary	Unknown		St. Mary's Church	Marble	Approx. 6 ft. x 2 ft. x 20 in.	St. Mary's Church	

== Schnellville ==
Title	Artist	Year	Location/GPS Coordinates	Material	Dimensions	Owner	Image
Sacred Heart of Jesus	Unknown	1914	Sacred Heart Church 38°20′30.24″N 86°45′15.58″W	Limestone	Approx. 6 x 2 1/2 x 2 ft.	Sacred Heart Church	
