= Hall Township, Dubois County, Indiana =

Hall Township
- Township
- Location of Hall Township in Dubois County
- Coordinates: 38°23′49″N 86°44′15″W
- Country: United States
- State: Indiana
- County: Dubois

Government
  - Type: Indiana township

Area
  - Total: 36.65 sq mi (94.9 km^{2})
  - Land: 33.36 sq mi (86.4 km^{2})
  - Water: 3.28 sq mi (8.5 km^{2})
- Elevation: 617 ft (188 m)

Population (2020)
  - Total: 1,312
  - Density: 38.4/sq mi (14.8/km^{2})
- FIPS code: 18-30456
- GNIS feature ID: 453362

Hall Township is one of twelve townships in Dubois County, Indiana. As of the 2010 census, its population was 1,281 and it contained 489 housing units.

== Geography ==
According to the 2010 census, the township has a total area of 36.65 square miles (94.9 km^{2}), of which 33.36 square miles (86.4 km^{2}) (or 91.02%) is land and 3.28 square miles (8.5 km^{2}) (or 8.95%) is water.

=== Unincorporated towns ===
- Celestine
- Ellsworth

(This list is based on USGS data and may include former settlements.)

=== Adjacent townships ===
- Columbia Township (north)
- Jackson Township, Orange County (northeast)
- Patoka Township, Crawford County (east)
- Jefferson Township (south)
- Jackson Township (southwest)
- Marion Township (west)

=== Major highways ===
- Indiana State Road 164

=== Cemeteries ===
The township contains two cemeteries: Adkins and Bailey.

== Education ==
Hall Township is in Northeast Dubois County School Corporation. The comprehensive high school of that school district is Northeast Dubois High School.
