= Marion Township, Dubois County, Indiana =

Marion Township
- Township
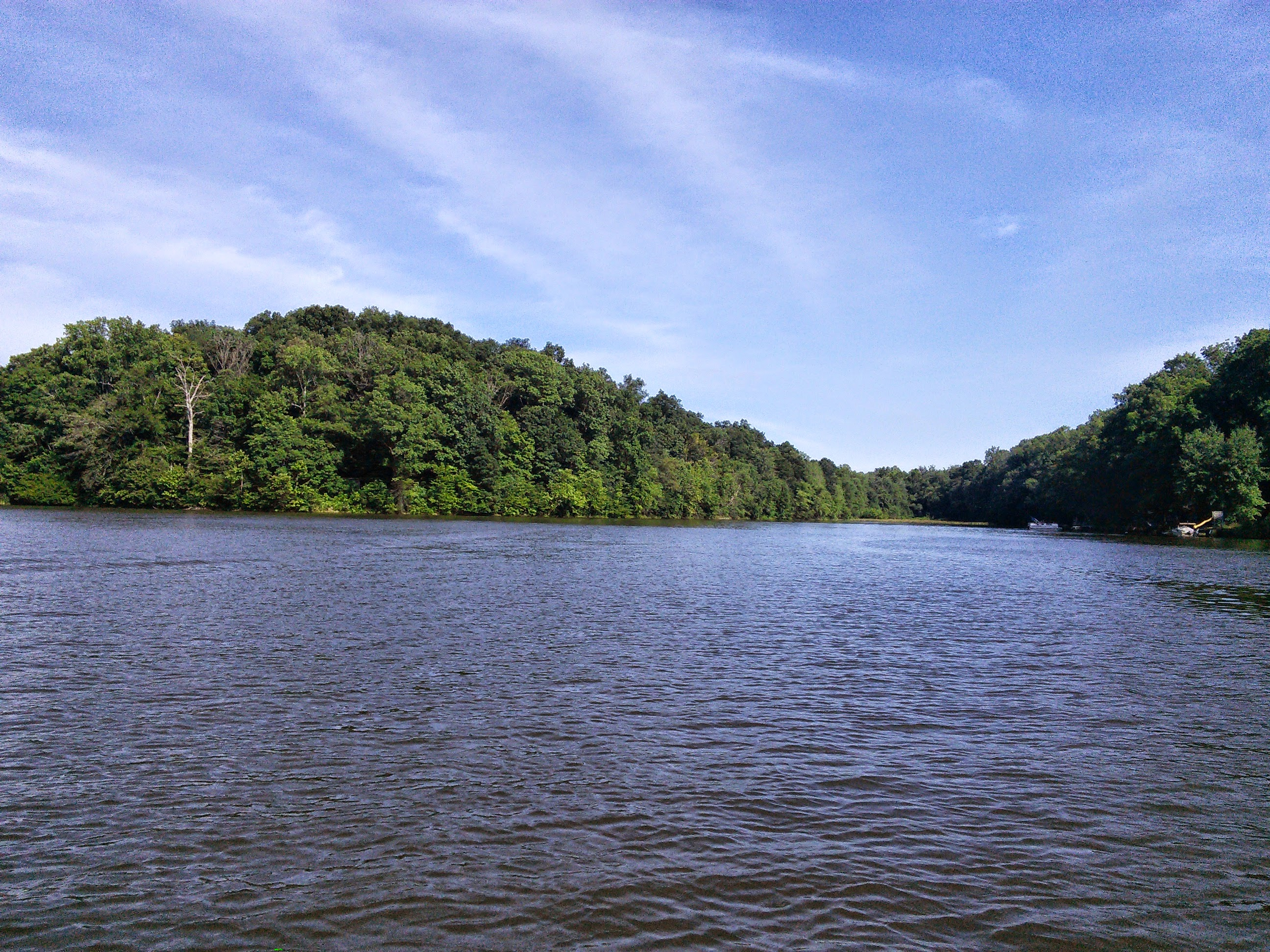
- Beaver Lake, located in Marion Township

- Location of Marion Township in Dubois County
- Coordinates: 38°24′02″N 86°50′15″W
- Country: United States
- State: Indiana
- County: Dubois

Government
  - Type: Indiana township

Area
  - Total: 32.66 sq mi (84.6 km^{2})
  - Land: 31.71 sq mi (82.1 km^{2})
  - Water: 0.95 sq mi (2.5 km^{2})
- Elevation: 499 ft (152 m)

Population (2020)
  - Total: 1,432
  - Density: 47.3/sq mi (18.3/km^{2})
- FIPS code: 18-46890
- GNIS feature ID: 453605

Marion Township is one of twelve townships in Dubois County, Indiana. As of the 2010 census, its population was 1,501 and it contained 767 housing units.

== History ==
Marion Township was created from land given by Bainbridge, Hall, Columbia, Harbison, and Patoka townships.

== Geography ==
According to the 2010 census, the township has a total area of 32.66 square miles (84.6 km^{2}), of which 31.71 square miles (82.1 km^{2}) (or 97.09%) is land and 0.95 square miles (2.5 km^{2}) (or 2.91%) is water.

=== Unincorporated towns ===
- Dubois (part)

=== Adjacent townships ===
- Harbison Township (north)
- Columbia Township (northeast)
- Hall Township (east)
- Jackson Township (south)
- Bainbridge Township (west)

=== Major highways ===
- Indiana State Road 164

== Education ==
Marion Township is in Northeast Dubois County School Corporation. The comprehensive high school of that school district is Northeast Dubois High School.

In 1948 Harbison and Marion townships were planning a joint high school.
