= Bainbridge Township, Dubois County, Indiana =

Bainbridge Township
- Township
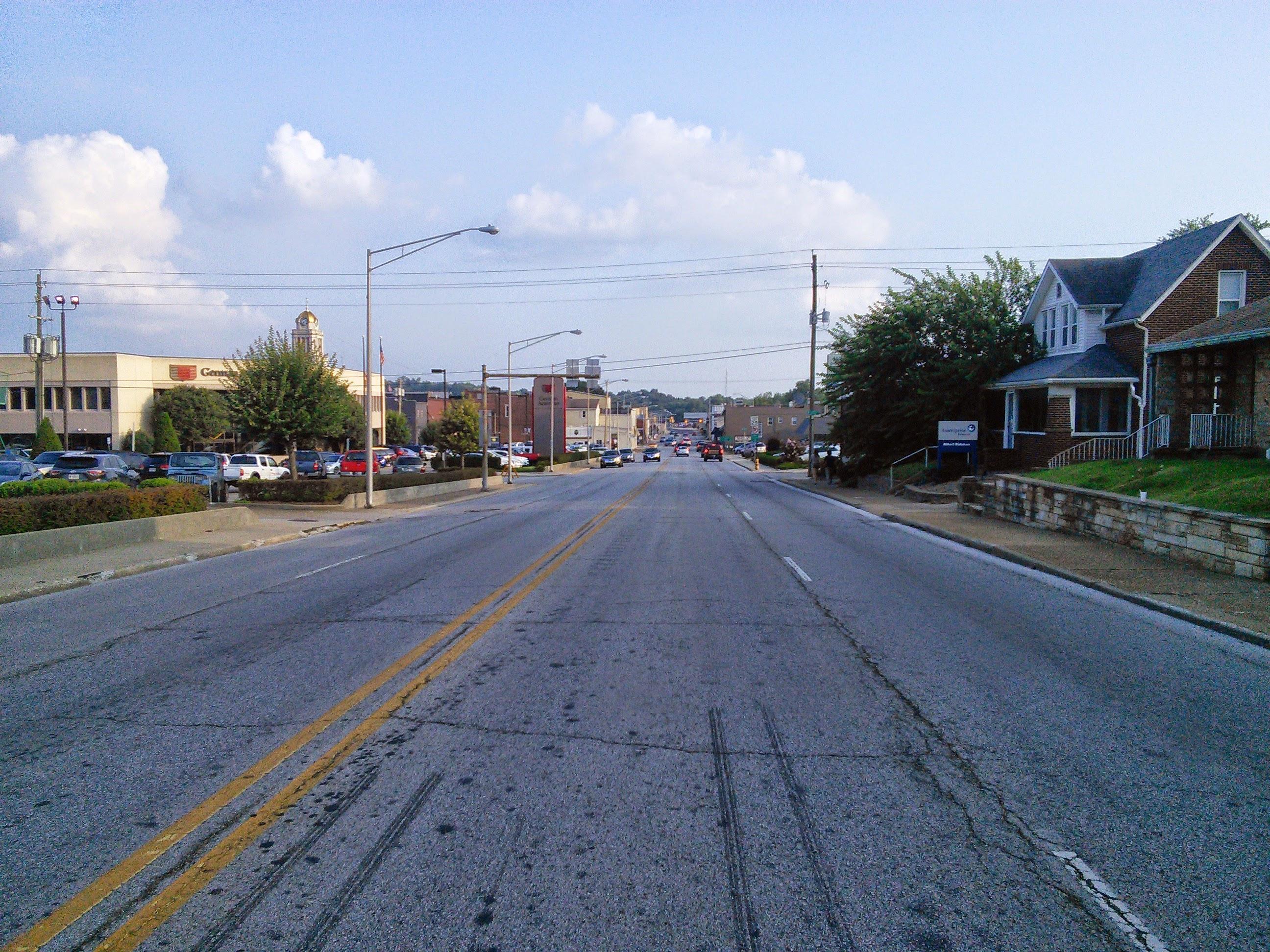
- Newton Street in Jasper, Indiana

- Location of Bainbridge Township in Dubois County
- Coordinates: 38°23′11″N 86°55′57″W
- Country: United States
- State: Indiana
- County: Dubois

Government
  - Type: Indiana township

Area
  - Total: 35.48 sq mi (91.9 km^{2})
  - Land: 35.08 sq mi (90.9 km^{2})
  - Water: 0.41 sq mi (1.1 km^{2})
- Elevation: 453 ft (138 m)

Population (2020)
  - Total: 17,184
  - Density: 456.7/sq mi (176.3/km^{2})
- FIPS code: 18-03124
- GNIS feature ID: 453093

Bainbridge Township is one of twelve townships in Dubois County, Indiana. As of the 2010 census, its population was 16,020 and it contained 6,870 housing units. The city of Jasper, Indiana is contained within the township.

== History ==
Bainbridge Township was originally settled chiefly by Germans.

== Geography ==
According to the 2010 census, the township has a total area of 35.48 square miles (91.9 km^{2}), of which 35.08 square miles (90.9 km^{2}) (or 98.87%) is land and 0.41 square miles (1.1 km^{2}) (or 1.16%) is water.

=== Cities and towns ===
- Jasper

=== Unincorporated towns ===
(This list is based on USGS data and may include former settlements.)

=== Adjacent townships ===
- Harbison Township (northeast)
- Marion Township (east)
- Jackson Township (southeast)
- Patoka Township (southwest)
- Madison Township (west)
- Boone Township (northwest)

=== Major highways ===
- U.S. Route 231
- Indiana State Road 56
- Indiana State Road 162
- Indiana State Road 164

=== Cemeteries ===
The township contains three cemeteries: Evans, McKee Ditch and Wilhoit.
