= Dubois County, Indiana =

County in Indiana, United States

- County
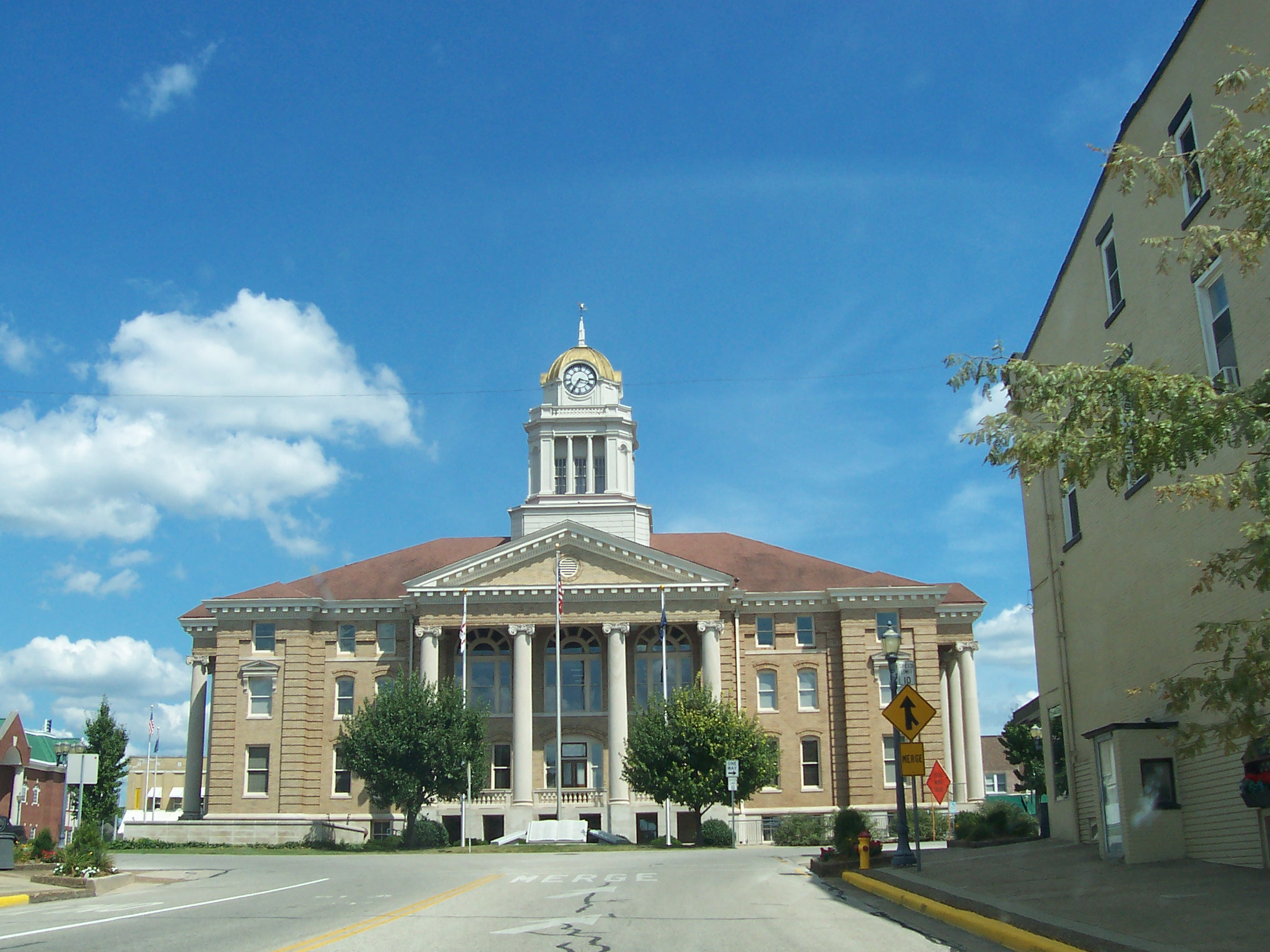
- The Dubois County Courthouse in Jasper, Indiana

- Location within the U.S. state of Indiana
- Coordinates: 38°22′N 86°53′W
- Country: United States
- State: Indiana
- Founded: December 20, 1818
- Named for: Toussaint Dubois
- Seat: Jasper
- Largest city: Jasper

Area
  - Total: 435.33 sq mi (1,127.5 km^{2})
  - Land: 427.27 sq mi (1,106.6 km^{2})
  - Water: 8.06 sq mi (20.9 km^{2}) 1.85%

Population (2020)
  - Total: 43,637
  - Estimate (2025): 44,016 ▲
  - Density: 97.4/sq mi (37.6/km^{2})
- Time zone: UTC−5 (Eastern)
  - Summer (DST): UTC−4 (EDT)
- Congressional district: 8th
- Website: https://www.duboiscountyin.org/
- Indiana county number 19

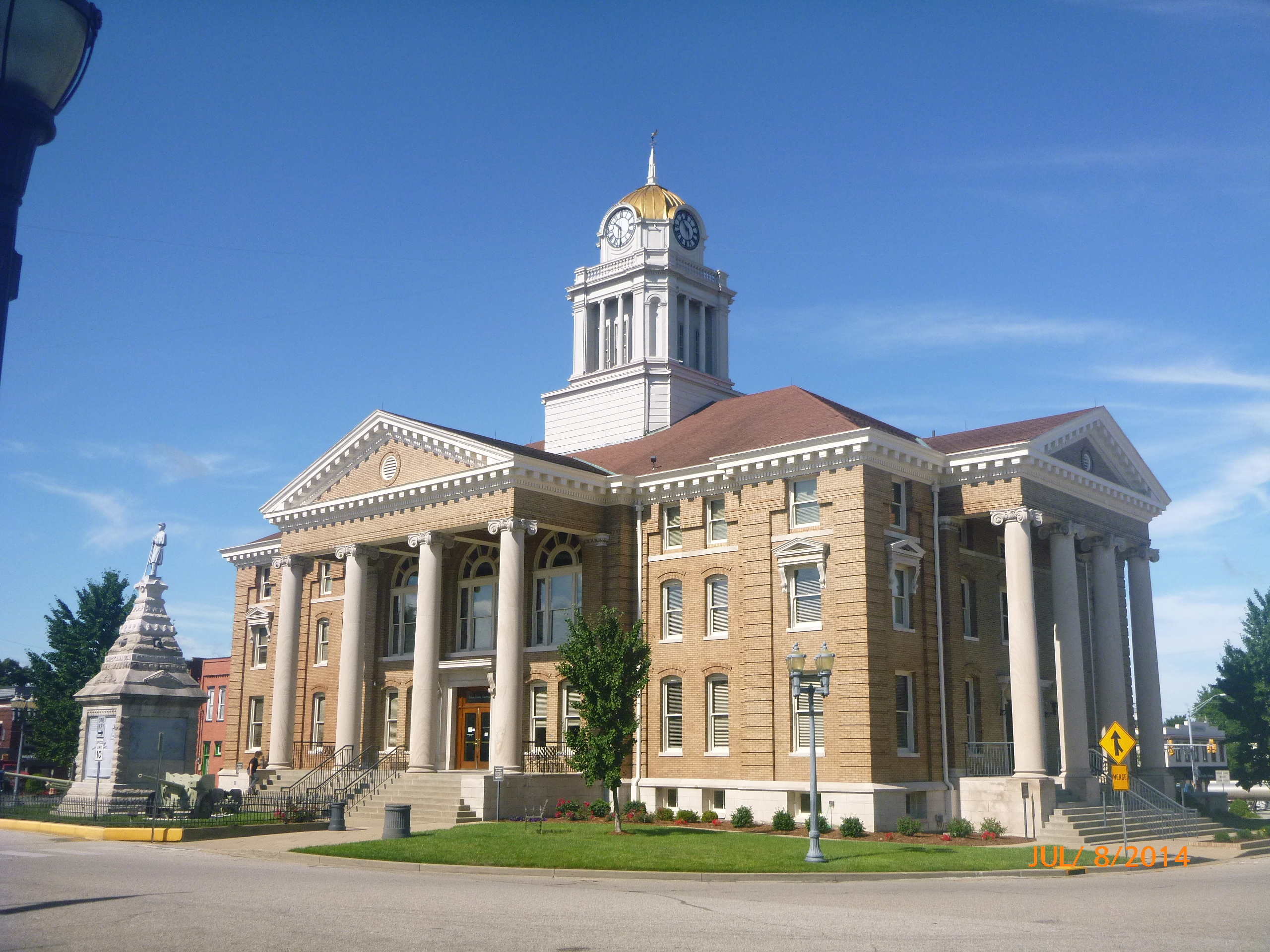
Dubois County Courthouse in Jasper

Dubois County (pronounced Dew Boyz) is a county located in the U.S. state of Indiana. As of 2020, the population was 43,637. The county seat is Jasper. Dubois County is now the sole county of the Jasper Micropolitan Statistical Area, anchored by the city of Jasper. In previous statistical definition updates, the area also included Pike County, which was removed in the 2023 updates.

== History ==
Dubois County was formed on December 20, 1818, from portions of Orange, Pike and Perry counties. It is named for Toussaint Dubois, a Frenchman who fought in the American Revolutionary War, the Battle of Tippecanoe and the War of 1812. Dubois was a merchant who lived mainly in Vincennes. He drowned in 1816 while crossing the Little Wabash River near Lawrenceville, Illinois.

In 1818, as many as half of the residents of the county died of milk sickness. The plant contains the potent toxin temetrol, which is passed through the milk. The migrants from the East were unfamiliar with the Midwestern plant and its effects.

Dubois County switched to the Central Time Zone on April 2, 2006, and returned to the Eastern Time Zone on November 4, 2007; both changes were controversial as Huntingburg wished to remain on Central Time while Jasper never wanted to leave Eastern Time.

The original county seat was Portersville. In 1830, the county seat was moved south to Jasper.

== Geography ==
According to the 2010 census, the county has a total area of 435.33 square miles (1,127.5 km^{2}), of which 427.27 square miles (1,106.6 km^{2}) (or 98.15%) is land and 8.06 square miles (20.9 km^{2}) (or 1.85%) is water.

=== Cities ===
- Jasper
- Huntingburg

=== Towns ===
- Birdseye
- Ferdinand
- Holland

=== Census-designated places ===
- Dubois

=== Other unincorporated places ===
- Bretzville
- Celestine
- Crystal
- Cuzco
- Duff
- Ellsworth
- Haysville
- Hillham
- Ireland
- Johnsburg
- Kellerville
- Kyana
- Mentor
- Millersport
- Portersville
- Schnellville
- Saint Anthony
- Saint Henry
- Saint Marks
- Zoar

=== Townships ===
- Bainbridge
- Boone
- Cass
- Columbia
- Ferdinand
- Hall
- Harbison
- Jackson
- Jefferson
- Madison
- Marion
- Patoka

=== Adjacent counties ===
- Martin County (north)
- Orange County (northeast)
- Crawford County (east)
- Perry County (southeast/CT Border)
- Spencer County (south/CT Border)
- Warrick County (southwest/CT Border)
- Pike County (west)
- Daviess County (northwest)

=== Climate and weather ===
Jasper, Indiana

Climate chart (precipitation, max. and min. temperature)
| J | F | M | A | M | J | J | A | S | O | N | D |
| 3 38 20 | 2.8 44 24 | 4.1 54 33 | 4.7 65 43 | 5.3 74 52 | 4.7 82 61 | 4.4 86 66 | 4.1 85 63 | 3.6 79 56 | 3.2 67 44 | 4.3 55 35 | 3.5 43 25 |
- █ Average max. and min. temperatures in °F
- █ Precipitation totals in inches
- Source: The Weather Channel
Metric conversion
| J | F | M | A | M | J | J | A | S | O | N | D |
| 77 3 −7 | 71 7 −4 | 104 12 1 | 118 18 6 | 134 23 11 | 119 28 16 | 111 30 19 | 105 29 17 | 90 26 13 | 80 19 7 | 109 13 2 | 89 6 −4 |
- █ Average max. and min. temperatures in °C
- █ Precipitation totals in mm

In recent years, average temperatures in Jasper have ranged from a low of 20 °F (−7 °C) in January to a high of 86 °F (30 °C) in July, although a record low of −25 °F (−32 °C) was recorded in January 1994 and a record high of 104 °F (40 °C) was recorded in July 1966. Average monthly precipitation ranged from 2.81 inches (71 mm) in February to 5.29 inches (134 mm) in May.

== Politics ==
United States presidential election results for Dubois County, Indiana
| Year | Republican | | Democratic | | Third party(ies) | |
| Year | No. | % | No. | % | No. | % |
|---|---|---|---|---|---|---|
| 1888 | 1,220 | 28.88% | 2,986 | 70.67% | 19 | 0.45% |
| 1892 | 1,081 | 26.12% | 2,847 | 68.80% | 210 | 5.07% |
| 1896 | 1,215 | 28.64% | 3,005 | 70.82% | 23 | 0.54% |
| 1900 | 1,362 | 29.65% | 3,192 | 69.48% | 40 | 0.87% |
| 1904 | 1,413 | 30.77% | 3,119 | 67.92% | 60 | 1.31% |
| 1908 | 1,397 | 28.88% | 3,344 | 69.12% | 97 | 2.00% |
| 1912 | 666 | 14.81% | 3,059 | 68.01% | 773 | 17.19% |
| 1916 | 1,492 | 32.07% | 3,072 | 66.02% | 89 | 1.91% |
| 1920 | 3,738 | 46.18% | 4,238 | 52.35% | 119 | 1.47% |
| 1924 | 2,708 | 30.53% | 5,651 | 63.71% | 511 | 5.76% |
| 1928 | 3,301 | 35.18% | 6,044 | 64.41% | 39 | 0.42% |
| 1932 | 2,357 | 23.58% | 7,547 | 75.50% | 92 | 0.92% |
| 1936 | 3,011 | 29.07% | 6,927 | 66.87% | 421 | 4.06% |
| 1940 | 4,729 | 44.01% | 5,992 | 55.77% | 24 | 0.22% |
| 1944 | 4,855 | 47.78% | 5,273 | 51.89% | 34 | 0.33% |
| 1948 | 4,295 | 39.30% | 6,564 | 60.07% | 69 | 0.63% |
| 1952 | 6,538 | 53.47% | 5,658 | 46.27% | 31 | 0.25% |
| 1956 | 6,942 | 57.19% | 5,177 | 42.65% | 20 | 0.16% |
| 1960 | 5,117 | 38.32% | 8,214 | 61.51% | 22 | 0.16% |
| 1964 | 3,800 | 27.26% | 10,114 | 72.56% | 25 | 0.18% |
| 1968 | 5,865 | 43.24% | 6,725 | 49.58% | 973 | 7.17% |
| 1972 | 6,637 | 50.36% | 6,365 | 48.30% | 177 | 1.34% |
| 1976 | 6,383 | 45.97% | 7,385 | 53.19% | 116 | 0.84% |
| 1980 | 6,775 | 47.46% | 6,700 | 46.93% | 801 | 5.61% |
| 1984 | 9,391 | 62.77% | 5,423 | 36.25% | 148 | 0.99% |
| 1988 | 9,995 | 62.28% | 5,954 | 37.10% | 99 | 0.62% |
| 1992 | 6,785 | 42.44% | 5,878 | 36.76% | 3,326 | 20.80% |
| 1996 | 6,840 | 44.85% | 6,499 | 42.62% | 1,911 | 12.53% |
| 2000 | 10,134 | 65.36% | 5,090 | 32.83% | 280 | 1.81% |
| 2004 | 11,726 | 68.71% | 5,210 | 30.53% | 130 | 0.76% |
| 2008 | 9,526 | 51.23% | 8,748 | 47.05% | 319 | 1.72% |
| 2012 | 11,654 | 62.75% | 6,522 | 35.12% | 395 | 2.13% |
| 2016 | 13,365 | 66.51% | 5,389 | 26.82% | 1,341 | 6.67% |
| 2020 | 15,033 | 68.94% | 6,292 | 28.85% | 481 | 2.21% |
| 2024 | 14,983 | 69.81% | 5,944 | 27.69% | 537 | 2.50% |

== Demographics ==
Historical population
| Census | Pop. | Note | %± |
|---|---|---|---|
| 1820 | 1,168 | | — |
| 1830 | 1,778 | | 52.2% |
| 1840 | 3,632 | | 104.3% |
| 1850 | 6,321 | | 74.0% |
| 1860 | 10,394 | | 64.4% |
| 1870 | 12,597 | | 21.2% |
| 1880 | 15,992 | | 27.0% |
| 1890 | 20,253 | | 26.6% |
| 1900 | 20,357 | | 0.5% |
| 1910 | 19,843 | | −2.5% |
| 1920 | 19,915 | | 0.4% |
| 1930 | 20,553 | | 3.2% |
| 1940 | 22,579 | | 9.9% |
| 1950 | 23,785 | | 5.3% |
| 1960 | 27,463 | | 15.5% |
| 1970 | 30,934 | | 12.6% |
| 1980 | 34,238 | | 10.7% |
| 1990 | 36,616 | | 6.9% |
| 2000 | 39,674 | | 8.4% |
| 2010 | 41,889 | | 5.6% |
| 2020 | 43,637 | | 4.2% |
| 2025 (est.) | 44,016 | ▲ | 0.9% |
U.S. Decennial Census; 1790-1960 1900-1990; 1990-2000 2010-2013

When Pike County was included, at the 2000 census, there were 52,511 people, 19,932 households and 14,419 families residing within the μSA. At the 2020 census, the Micropolitan area (μSA) had a population of 43,637 up from a population of 41,889 in the 2010 census.

=== Racial and ethnic composition ===
Dubois County, Indiana – Racial and ethnic composition Note: the US Census treats Hispanic/Latino as an ethnic category. This table excludes Latinos from the racial categories and assigns them to a separate category. Hispanics/Latinos may be of any race.
| Race / Ethnicity (NH = Non-Hispanic) | Pop 1980 | Pop 1990 | Pop 2000 | Pop 2010 | Pop 2020 | % 1980 | % 1990 | % 2000 | % 2010 | % 2020 |
|---|---|---|---|---|---|---|---|---|---|---|
| White alone (NH) | 34,021 | 36,258 | 38,266 | 38,791 | 38,137 | 99.37% | 99.02% | 96.45% | 92.60% | 87.40% |
| Black or African American alone (NH) | 8 | 33 | 53 | 109 | 190 | 0.02% | 0.09% | 0.13% | 0.26% | 0.44% |
| Native American or Alaska Native alone (NH) | 17 | 29 | 34 | 51 | 55 | 0.05% | 0.08% | 0.09% | 0.12% | 0.13% |
| Asian alone (NH) | 40 | 50 | 74 | 189 | 247 | 0.12% | 0.14% | 0.19% | 0.45% | 0.57% |
| Native Hawaiian or Pacific Islander alone (NH) | x | x | 11 | 5 | 5 | x | x | 0.03% | 0.01% | 0.01% |
| Other race alone (NH) | 14 | 2 | 5 | 19 | 89 | 0.04% | 0.01% | 0.01% | 0.05% | 0.20% |
| Mixed race or Multiracial (NH) | x | x | 128 | 204 | 768 | x | x | 0.32% | 0.49% | 1.76% |
| Hispanic or Latino (any race) | 138 | 244 | 1,103 | 2,521 | 4,146 | 0.40% | 0.67% | 2.78% | 6.02% | 9.50% |
| Total | 34,238 | 36,616 | 39,674 | 41,889 | 43,637 | 100.00% | 100.00% | 100.00% | 100.00% | 100.00% |

=== 2020 census ===
As of the 2020 census, the county had a population of 43,637. The median age was 41.2 years. 23.6% of residents were under the age of 18 and 18.4% of residents were 65 years of age or older. For every 100 females there were 99.2 males, and for every 100 females age 18 and over there were 97.3 males age 18 and over.

The racial makeup of the county was 89.1% White, 0.5% Black or African American, 0.3% American Indian and Alaska Native, 0.6% Asian, <0.1% Native Hawaiian and Pacific Islander, 5.6% from some other race, and 3.9% from two or more races. Hispanic or Latino residents of any race comprised 9.5% of the population.

52.4% of residents lived in urban areas, while 47.6% lived in rural areas.

There were 17,412 households in the county, of which 29.9% had children under the age of 18 living in them. Of all households, 55.4% were married-couple households, 17.2% were households with a male householder and no spouse or partner present, and 21.3% were households with a female householder and no spouse or partner present. About 27.1% of all households were made up of individuals and 11.8% had someone living alone who was 65 years of age or older.

There were 18,618 housing units, of which 6.5% were vacant. Among occupied housing units, 75.5% were owner-occupied and 24.5% were renter-occupied. The homeowner vacancy rate was 1.0% and the rental vacancy rate was 6.6%.

=== 2010 census ===
As of the 2010 United States census, there were 41,889 people, 16,133 households, and 11,459 families residing in the county. The population density was 98.0 inhabitants per square mile (37.8/km^{2}). There were 17,384 housing units at an average density of 40.7 per square mile (15.7/km^{2}). The racial makeup of the county was 95.1% white, 0.5% Asian, 0.3% black or African American, 0.2% American Indian, 3.1% from other races, and 0.9% from two or more races. Those of Hispanic or Latino origin made up 6.0% of the population. In terms of ancestry, 58.0% were German, 9.0% were American, 8.1% were Irish, and 6.7% were English.

Of the 16,133 households, 34.2% had children under the age of 18 living with them, 58.3% were married couples living together, 8.6% had a female householder with no husband present, 29.0% were non-families, and 24.7% of all households were made up of individuals. The average household size was 2.54 and the average family size was 3.03. The median age was 39.9 years.

The median income for a household in the county was $47,697 and the median income for a family was $64,286. Males had a median income of $42,078 versus $31,411 for females. The per capita income for the county was $24,801. About 6.9% of families and 9.6% of the population were below the poverty line, including 12.1% of those under age 18 and 10.4% of those age 65 or over.

== Economy ==
=== Personal income ===
The median income for a household in the county was $44,169, and the median income for a family was $50,342. Males had a median income of $32,484 versus $23,526 for females. The per capita income for the county was $20,225. About 2.90% of families and 6.20% of the population were below the poverty line, including 5.30% of those under age 18 and 7.30% of those age 65 or over.

=== Tourism ===
Patoka Lake is located along the county's eastern borders with both Crawford and Orange Counties. Several annual national bass fishing tournaments are held there.

The Hoosier National Forest is located in the county. Part of it is protected.

== Education ==
Public education in Dubois County is administered through four school corporations:

- Greater Jasper Consolidated Schools
- Southeast Dubois School Corporation
- Southwest Dubois School Corporation
- Northeast Dubois County School Corporation

High Schools

- Jasper High School (Greater Jasper Schools, Jasper)
- Forest Park High School (Southeast Dubois Schools, Ferdinand)
- Southridge High School (Southwest Dubois Schools, Huntingburg)
- Northeast Dubois High School (Northeast Dubois Schools, Dubois)

== Infrastructure ==
=== Major highways ===
- Interstate 64
- U.S. Route 231
- Indiana State Road 56
- Indiana State Road 64
- Indiana State Road 145
- Indiana State Road 161
- Indiana State Road 162
- Indiana State Road 164
- Indiana State Road 264
- Indiana State Road 545

== See also ==
- List of public art in Dubois County, Indiana
- National Register of Historic Places listings in Dubois County, Indiana
