= Cuzco, Indiana =

- Unincorporated community
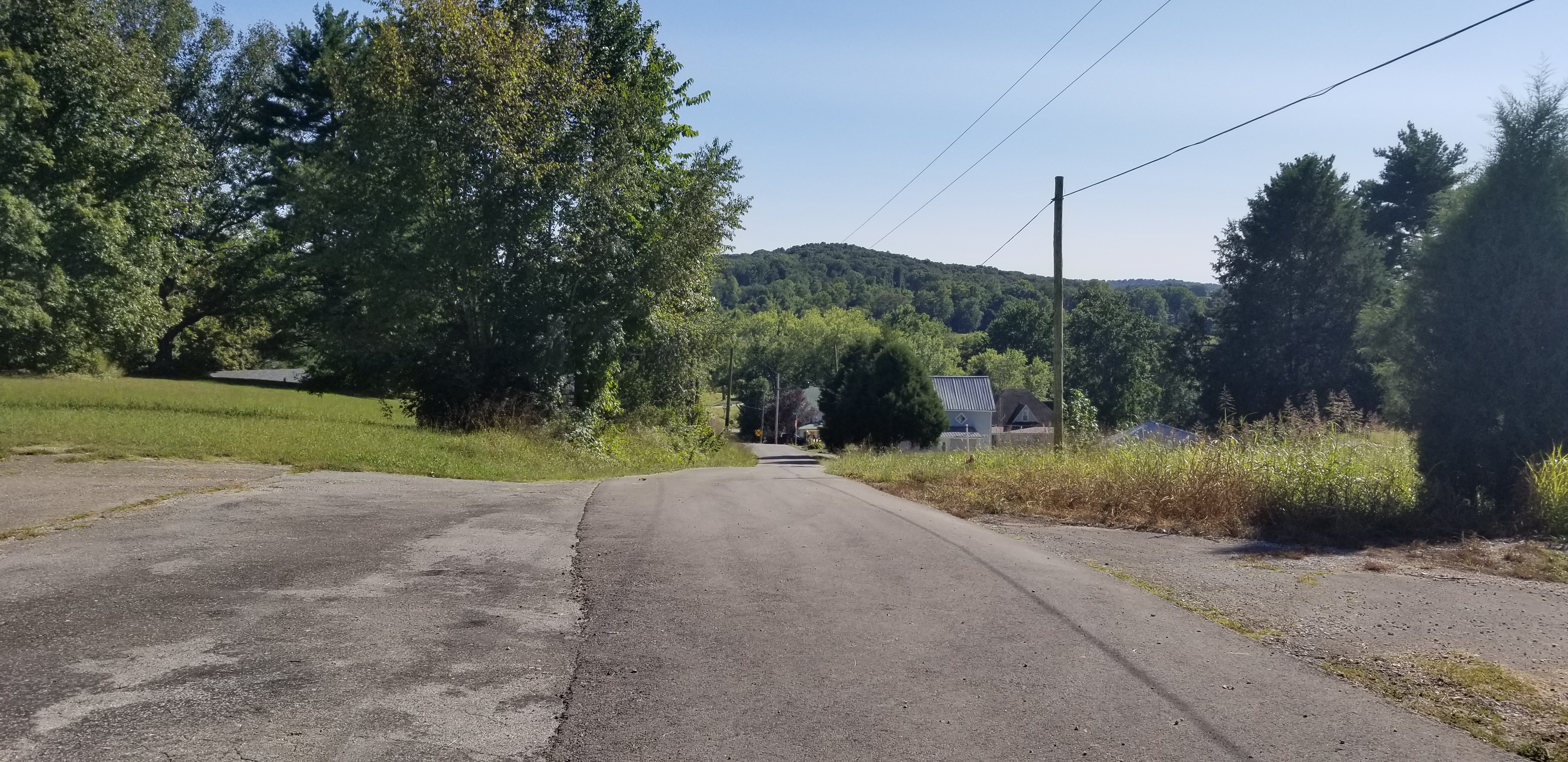

- Location within Indiana Location within the United States
- Coordinates: 38°28′30″N 86°43′22″W
- Country: United States
- State: Indiana
- County: Dubois
- Township: Columbia
- Elevation: 525 ft (160 m)
- Time zone: UTC-5 (Eastern (EST))
  - Summer (DST): UTC-4 (EDT)
- ZIP code: 47432
- Area codes: 812, 930
- FIPS code: 18-16498
- GNIS feature ID: 450826

Cuzco (pronounced: KUZ-co) is an unincorporated community in Columbia Township, Dubois County, in the U.S. state of Indiana.

== History ==
Cuzco was platted in 1905 by William H. Nicholson. It was named after Cusco, in Peru. A post office was established at Cuzco in 1902, and remained in operation until it was discontinued in 1955.

Civil War historian Gilbert R. Tredway was reared in Cuzco during the 1920s and 1930s.

== Education ==
Columbia Township is in the Northeast Dubois County School Corporation.

Prior to 1948, the community had its own high school. The school colors were black and white, and the mascot was the bear cubs. In 1948 the school merged into Dubois High School. The high school later became named Northeast Dubois High School.
