= Columbia Township, Dubois County, Indiana =

Columbia Township
- Township
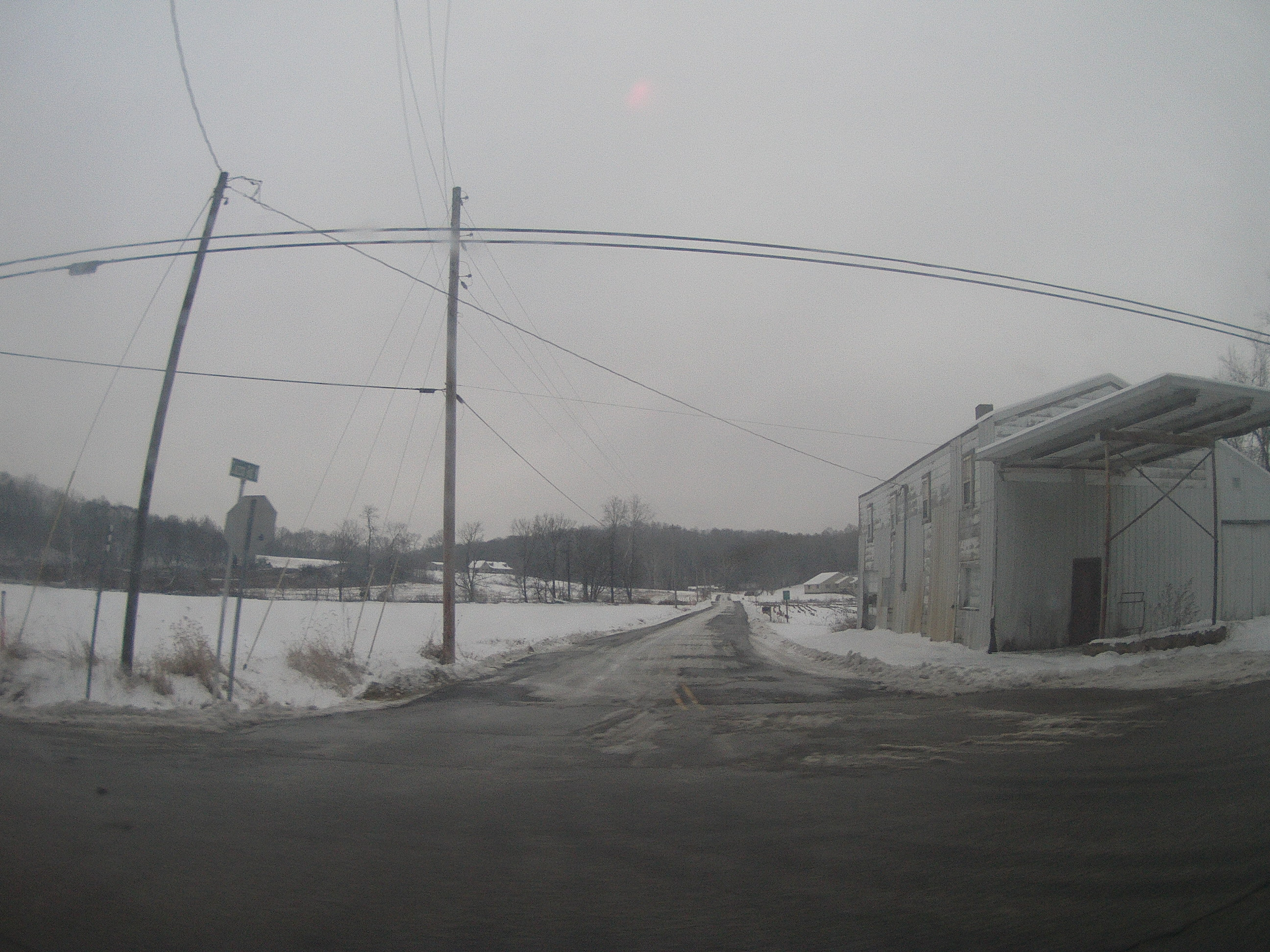
- Looking south on Cuzco Road from Highway 56, in Columbia Township

- Location of Columbia Township in Dubois County
- Coordinates: 38°28′53″N 86°44′01″W
- Country: United States
- State: Indiana
- County: Dubois

Government
  - Type: Indiana township

Area
  - Total: 36.43 sq mi (94.4 km^{2})
  - Land: 36.18 sq mi (93.7 km^{2})
  - Water: 0.25 sq mi (0.65 km^{2})
- Elevation: 564 ft (172 m)

Population (2020)
  - Total: 999
  - Density: 29.4/sq mi (11.4/km^{2})
- FIPS code: 18-14608
- GNIS feature ID: 453238

Columbia Township is one of twelve townships in Dubois County, Indiana. As of the 2010 census, its population was 1,065 and it contained 467 housing units.

== Geography ==
According to the 2010 census, the township has a total area of 36.43 square miles (94.4 km^{2}), of which 36.18 square miles (93.7 km^{2}) (or 99.31%) is land and 0.25 square miles (0.65 km^{2}) (or 0.69%) is water.

=== Unincorporated towns ===
- Crystal
- Cuzco
- Dubois (part)
- Hillham

(This list is based on USGS data and may include former settlements.)

=== Adjacent townships ===
- Lost River Township, Martin County (north)
- French Lick Township, Orange County (northeast)
- Jackson Township, Orange County (east)
- Hall Township (south)
- Marion Township (southwest)
- Harbison Township (west)

=== Major highways ===
- Indiana State Road 56

=== Cemeteries ===
The township contains three cemeteries: Burton, Robinson and Wininger.

== Education ==
Columbia Township is in Northeast Dubois County School Corporation. The comprehensive high school of that school district is Northeast Dubois High School.
