= Patoka Township, Indiana =

Patoka Township is the name of four townships in Indiana:

- Patoka Township, Crawford County, Indiana
- Patoka Township, Dubois County, Indiana
- Patoka Township, Gibson County, Indiana
- Patoka Township, Pike County, Indiana
