= Ellsworth, Indiana =

- Ghost town
- Location within Indiana Location within the United States
- Coordinates: 38°25′40″N 86°43′06″W
- Country: United States
- State: Indiana
- County: Dubois
- Township: Hall
- Elevation: 535 ft (163 m)
- Time zone: UTC-5 (Eastern (EST))
  - Summer (DST): UTC-4 (EDT)
- ZIP code: 47527
- Area codes: 812, 930
- GNIS feature ID: 450890

Ellsworth was a town in Hall Township, Dubois County, in the U.S. state of Indiana. It was abandoned in 1978 when the Patoka Reservoir was built, and it now lies at the bottom of the lake.

== History ==
Ellsworth was platted in 1885. It is named for James M. Ellis, a landowner.

A post office was established at Ellsworth in 1878, and remained in operation until 1916.

== Geography ==
Ellsworth was located at 38°25′40″N 86°43′06″W.

Even though Ellsworth no longer exists, it is still cited by the USGS.
