= Indiana State Road 164 =

Highway in Indiana

State Road 164
- SR 164 highlighted in red

Route information
- Maintained by INDOT
- Length: 19.096 mi (30.732 km)
- Existed: 1931–present

Major junctions
- West end: US 231 at Jasper
- East end: SR 145 near Wickliffe

Location
- Country: United States
- State: Indiana
- Counties: Crawford, Dubois

Highway system
- Indiana State Highway System; Interstate; US; State; Scenic
← SR 163	→ SR 165

State Road 164 in the U.S. state of Indiana is a short east–west two-lane highway in the southwest portion of the state.

== Route description ==
State Road 164 begins in downtown Jasper at the U.S. Route 231 and Courthouse Square intersection. Passing east out of town, the road winds through the country, passing to the south of Jasper Lake and through the small town of Celestine. Just before leaving Dubois County for Crawford County, it crosses an arm of Patoka Lake; it then passes through the small town of Wickliffe on the edge of the Hoosier National Forest before terminating at State Road 145 on the shores of another arm of the lake.

== Major intersections ==
County	Location	mi	km	Destinations	Notes
Dubois	Jasper	0.000	0.000	US 231	Western terminus of SR 164
Dubois	Hall Township	11.881	19.121	SR 545 north – Dubois	Southern terminus of SR 545
Crawford	Patoka Township	19.096	30.732	SR 145	Eastern terminus of SR 164
1.000 mi = 1.609 km; 1.000 km = 0.621 mi
