= Jefferson Township, Dubois County, Indiana =

Jefferson Township
- Township
- Location of Jefferson Township in Dubois County
- Coordinates: 38°18′07″N 86°43′18″W
- Country: United States
- State: Indiana
- County: Dubois

Government
  - Type: Indiana township

Area
  - Total: 35.85 sq mi (92.9 km^{2})
  - Land: 35.7 sq mi (92 km^{2})
  - Water: 0.15 sq mi (0.39 km^{2})
- Elevation: 636 ft (194 m)

Population (2020)
  - Total: 1,604
  - Density: 43.2/sq mi (16.7/km^{2})
- FIPS code: 18-37926
- GNIS feature ID: 453482

Jefferson Township is one of twelve townships in Dubois County, Indiana. As of the 2010 census, its population was 1,543 and it contained 683 housing units.

== History ==
Jefferson Township was created from land given by Hall Township.

== Geography ==
According to the 2010 census, the township has a total area of 35.85 square miles (92.9 km^{2}), of which 35.7 square miles (92 km^{2}) (or 99.58%) is land and 0.15 square miles (0.39 km^{2}) (or 0.42%) is water.

=== Cities and towns ===
- Birdseye

=== Unincorporated towns ===
- Mentor
- Schnellville

=== Adjacent townships ===
- Hall Township (north)
- Patoka Township, Crawford County (northeast)
- Johnson Township, Crawford County (east)
- Clark Township, Perry County (south)
- Ferdinand Township (southwest)
- Jackson Township (west)

=== Major highways ===
- Indiana State Road 64
- Indiana State Road 145

=== Cemeteries ===
The township contains five cemeteries: Cox, Garland, Spencer, Taylor and Waddle.
