= Toussaint Dubois =

Toussaint Dubois (October 8, 1762 – May 10, 1816) was a Montreal born person and American soldier who joined with Lafayette to fight for American independence in the American Revolutionary War.

== Biography ==
Toussaint DuBois was born Oct. 8 1762 to Charles Quintin dit Dubois and Cecile (Couvret) in St-Laurent, near Montreal (Quebec), his parents having married there on Oct. 26 1753 (Charles' second marriage). Early reports stated that DuBois fought alongside Lafayette in 1777 but more recent research seems to indicate that he only arrived in Vincennes after the war of Independence. Settling near Vincennes, Indiana, he became a fur trader. He married twice: first to Jeanne Bonneau, by whom he had four sons and a daughter. Jeanne Bonneau was born in 1770 in Vincennes, Indiana, and died in 1800. Their four children were: Suzanne (born 1789), Charles (born 1795), Francois (b. 1794) and Henry (b. 1792). They were married on October 6, 1788, in Indiana. After the early death of Jeannette, Toussaint DuBois married Jane Baird in 1805. Jane Baird was born in 1781 in Pennsylvania. The three sons born to Jane Baird Dubois and Toussaint Dubois were: Thomas Baird (b. 1806 in Illinois), Jesse Kilgore (b. 1811 in Illinois) and James (born circa 1810 in Illinois).

As a captain, DuBois commanded the Company of Spies and Guides of the Indiana militia at the 1811 Battle of Tippecanoe. He also served as a Major in the War of 1812, commanding the Kentucky Mounted Spies.

DuBois drowned in 1816 while crossing the Little Wabash River in Illinois, when he was returning from business in St. Louis, Missouri. He was buried in Vincennes.

Toussaint Dubois's residence in Lawrenceville, Illinois, served as the seat of government after the formation of Lawrence County, Illinois in 1821.

== Legacy ==
Toussaint Dubois is the namesake of Dubois County, Indiana.

His grandson Fred Dubois, would serve as Senator for Idaho.
