= Saint Marks, Indiana =

Saint Marks
- Unincorporated community
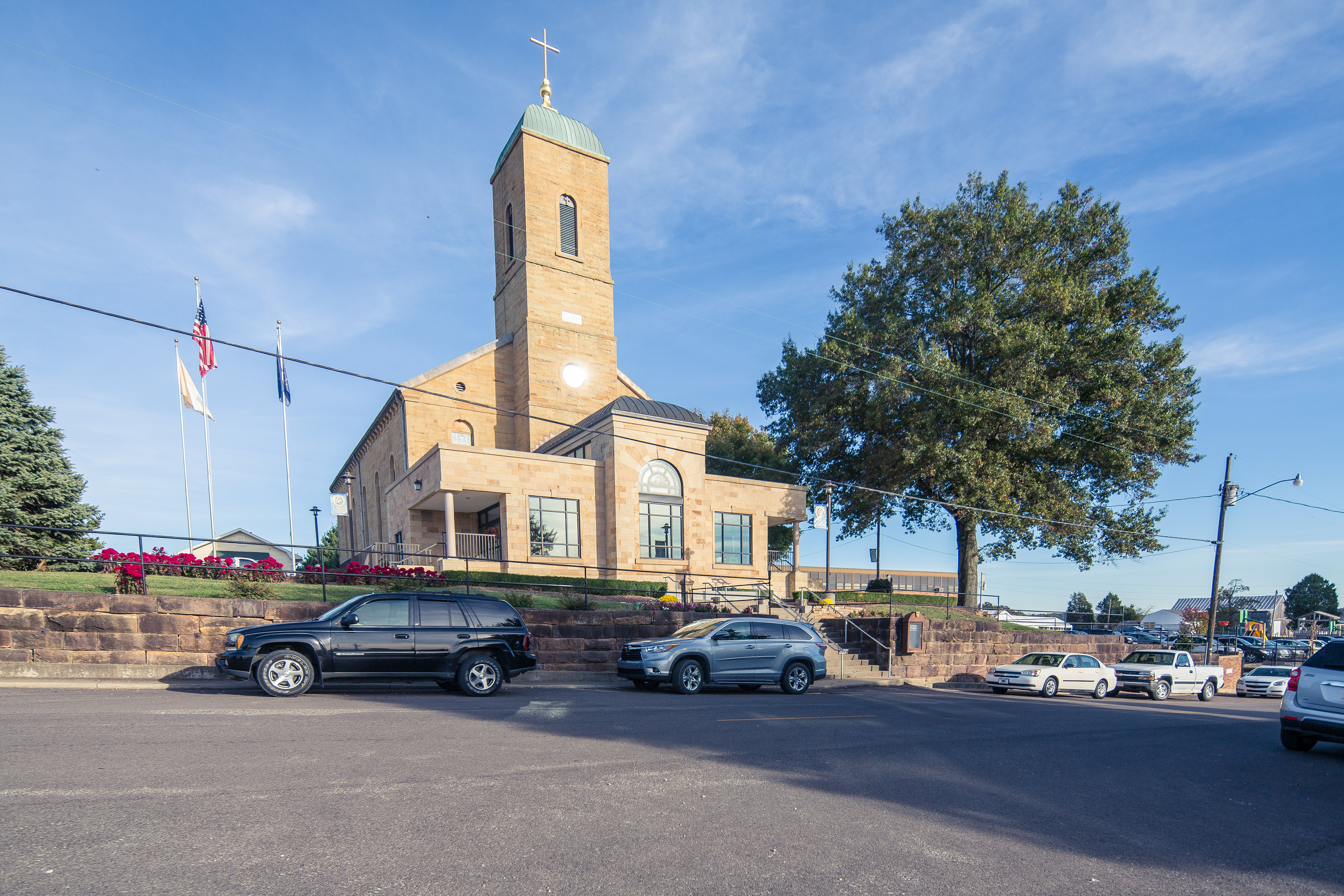

- Location within Indiana Location within the United States
- Coordinates: 38°18′20″N 86°49′05″W
- Country: United States
- State: Indiana
- County: Dubois
- Township: Jackson
- Elevation: 525 ft (160 m)
- Time zone: UTC-5 (EST)
  - Summer (DST): UTC-4 (EDT)
- ZIP code: 47575
- Area code: 812
- FIPS code: 18-67014
- GNIS feature ID: 442675

Saint Marks is an unincorporated community in Jackson Township, Dubois County, in the U.S. state of Indiana.

== History ==
Saint Marks was laid out in 1872 by M. B. Cox.
