= Floyd Newkirk =

American baseball player (1908-1976)

- Pitcher
- Born: July 16, 1908; Norris City, Illinois
- Died: April 15, 1976 (aged 67); Clayton, Missouri
- Batted: Right Threw: Right

MLB debut
- August 21, 1934, for the New York Yankees

Last MLB appearance
- August 21, 1934, for the New York Yankees

MLB statistics
- Games: 1
- Earned run average: 0.00
- Strikeouts: 0
- Stats at Baseball Reference

Teams
- New York Yankees (1934)

Floyd Elmo Newkirk (July 16, 1908 – April 15, 1976) was a Major League Baseball pitcher. The younger brother of former Chicago Cubs pitcher Joel Newkirk, Newkirk played for the New York Yankees in 1934. In one career game, he had a 0–0 record, with a 0.00 ERA, pitching in only 1 inning. He batted and threw right-handed. His nickname was "Three-Fingered" as he had suffered an injury at a Gary, Indiana steel mill in 1927 that resulted in the loss of two fingers on his pitching hand.

Newkirk had offers from six different major league teams and ended up signing a contract with the Yankees in June 1930. His decision to pick the Yankees was tied that his coach at Illinois College was former pitcher Lew Brockett. Considered the best pitching prospect of the Illinois Conference in 1930, the Yankees sent Newkirk to the Chambersburg Maroons of the Blue Ridge League, a team they owned. After getting six wins with the Maroons, the Yankees promoted him to the Albany Senators of the Eastern League.

Newkirk threw a no-hitter on May 22, 1933 while a member of the St. Paul Saints of the American Association. Newkirk faced 29 batters of the Kansas City Blues, only giving up three baserunners on three errors. Newkirk pitched for the Newark Bears of the International League in 1934. Newkirk made his MLB debut on August 21, 1934 against the St. Louis Browns, coming in relief of Danny MacFayden in an 8–6 loss. On August 18, 1935, the Yankees made a deal to send Newkirk, minor league pitcher Jim Densmore, outfielder Ted Norbert and first baseman Les Powers on option to the San Francisco Seals of the Pacific Coast League that would bring future National Baseball Hall of Fame member Joe DiMaggio to The Bronx.

Newkirk joined the United States Army's efforts during World War II in 1942, serving with the 78th Training Division (known as "Lightning"). His background as a pitcher had the Army put him on the recreation program. He attempted to join the military in December 1941, but rejected. He re-applied and was accepted into the military on September 15, where he was sent to Fort McClellan in Alabama before being moved to the 78th Training Division. After serving in the Army, Newkirk became a real estate agent in Jacksonville, Illinois in August 1944.
