= Duff, Indiana =

- Unincorporated community
- Location within Indiana Location within the United States
- Coordinates: 38°19′38″N 87°01′35″W
- Country: United States
- State: Indiana
- County: Dubois
- Township: Patoka
- Elevation: 466 ft (142 m)
- Time zone: UTC-5 (Eastern (EST))
  - Summer (DST): UTC-4 (EDT)
- ZIP code: 47542
- Area codes: 812, 930
- FIPS code: 18-18874
- GNIS feature ID: 433754

Duff is an unincorporated community in Patoka Township, Dubois County, in the U.S. state of Indiana.

== History ==
Duff was platted in 1883 by Robert Small. It was likely named for Col. B. B. Edmonston, who had the nickname "Colonel Duff".

A post office was established at Duff in 1868, and remained in operation until it was discontinued in 1955.
