= Bretzville, Indiana =

- Unincorporated community and Census designated place
- Location within Indiana Location within the United States
- Coordinates: 38°17′56″N 86°52′10″W
- Country: United States
- State: Indiana
- County: Dubois
- Township: Jackson
- Founder: William Bretz Jr.
- Named for: William Bretz Jr.
- Elevation: 509 ft (155 m)
- Time zone: UTC-5 (Eastern (EST))
  - Summer (DST): UTC-4 (EDT)
- ZIP code: 47542
- Area codes: 812, 930
- FIPS code: 18-07426
- GNIS feature ID: 2830361

Bretzville is an unincorporated community in Jackson Township, Dubois County, in the U.S. state of Indiana.

== History ==
Around the year 1850, William Bretz Sr. settled on the land. In 1866, his son, William Bretz Jr. mapped the land. The town was originally called New Town. When the townspeople wanted a post office, the government suggested the name be changed because it sounded like Newton, Indiana. The town was renamed Bretzville after its founder in June 1873. The post office was built in 1866, and was discontinued in 1915. In 1880, Bretzville's first school was started.

=== Bretzville Cemetery ===
The Bretzville Cemetery is located southeast of Bretzville at 38°17′36″N 86°51′27″W

== Demographics ==
The United States Census Bureau delineated Bretzville as a census designated place in the 2022 American Community Survey.

== Schools ==
- Cedar Crest Intermediate

== Highways ==
- State Road 64
- State Road 162 "William A. Koch Memorial Highway"
