= Ferdinand Township, Dubois County, Indiana =

Ferdinand Township
- Township
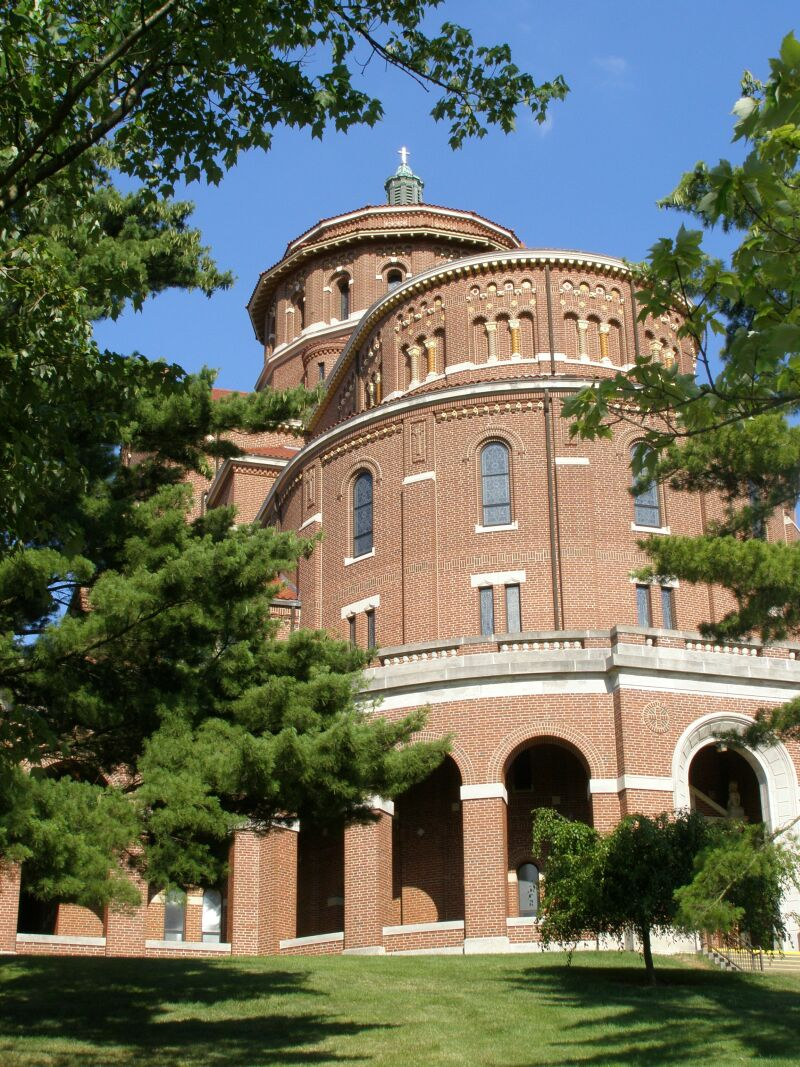
- The Monastery of Immaculate Conception in Ferdinand

- Location of Ferdinand Township in Dubois County
- Coordinates: 38°14′33″N 86°51′08″W
- Country: United States
- State: Indiana
- County: Dubois

Government
  - Type: Indiana township

Area
  - Total: 37.34 sq mi (96.7 km^{2})
  - Land: 37.04 sq mi (95.9 km^{2})
  - Water: 0.3 sq mi (0.78 km^{2})
- Elevation: 490 ft (150 m)

Population (2020)
  - Total: 3,604
  - Density: 98/sq mi (38/km^{2})
- FIPS code: 18-23008
- GNIS feature ID: 453294

Ferdinand Township is one of twelve townships in Dubois County, Indiana. As of the 2010 census, its population was 3,629 and it contained 1,389 housing units.

== Geography ==
According to the 2010 census, the township has a total area of 37.34 square miles (96.7 km^{2}), of which 37.04 square miles (95.9 km^{2}) (or 99.20%) is land and 0.3 square miles (0.78 km^{2}) (or 0.80%) is water. Camp Ground Lake is in this township.

The Ferdinand State Forest and lake is also located in Ferdinand Township.

=== Cities and towns ===
- Ferdinand

=== Adjacent townships ===
- Jackson Township (north)
- Jefferson Township (northeast)
- Clark Township, Perry County (southeast)
- Harrison Township, Spencer County (south)
- Carter Township, Spencer County (southwest)
- Cass Township (west)
- Patoka Township (northwest)

=== Major highways ===
- Interstate 64
- Indiana State Road 162

=== Cemeteries ===
The township contains two cemeteries, Pinkston-Hagan Cemetery and St. Ferdinand Catholic Church Cemetery.
