= Jackson Township, Dubois County, Indiana =

Jackson Township
- Township
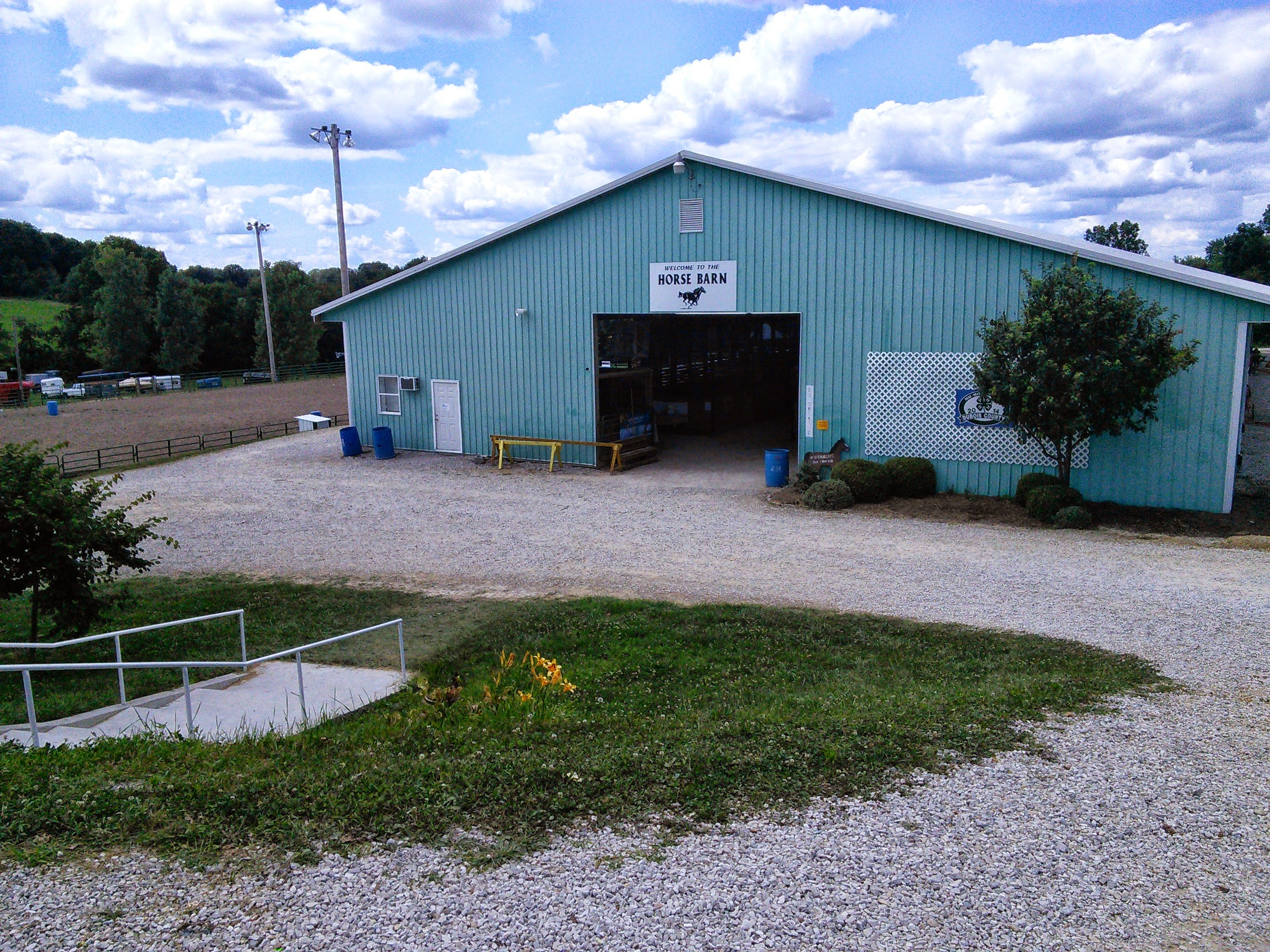
- Dubois County 4-H Fairgrounds, located in Jackson Township

- Location of Jackson Township in Dubois County
- Coordinates: 38°18′49″N 86°50′02″W
- Country: United States
- State: Indiana
- County: Dubois

Government
  - Type: Indiana township

Area
  - Total: 34.88 sq mi (90.3 km^{2})
  - Land: 34.63 sq mi (89.7 km^{2})
  - Water: 0.26 sq mi (0.67 km^{2})
- Elevation: 486 ft (148 m)

Population (2020)
  - Total: 2,162
  - Density: 61.4/sq mi (23.7/km^{2})
- FIPS code: 18-36954
- GNIS feature ID: 453441

Jackson Township is one of twelve townships in Dubois County, Indiana. As of the 2010 census, its population was 2,125 and it contained 844 housing units.

== History ==
Jackson Township was originally built up chiefly by Germans.

== Geography ==
According to the 2010 census, the township has a total area of 34.88 square miles (90.3 km^{2}), of which 34.63 square miles (89.7 km^{2}) (or 99.28%) is land and 0.26 square miles (0.67 km^{2}) (or 0.75%) is water.

=== Unincorporated towns ===
- Bretzville
- Kyana
- Saint Anthony
- Saint Marks

(This list is based on USGS data and may include former settlements.)

=== Adjacent townships ===
- Marion Township (north)
- Hall Township (northeast)
- Jefferson Township (east)
- Ferdinand Township (south)
- Patoka Township (west)
- Bainbridge Township (northwest)

=== Major highways ===
- Indiana State Road 64
- Indiana State Road 162

=== Cemeteries ===
The township contains three cemeteries: Bretzville, Dungan and Main.
