= Joel Newkirk =

American baseball player (1896–1966)

- Pitcher
- Born: June 1, 1896; Kyana, Indiana, US
- Died: January 22, 1966 (aged 69); Eldorado, Illinois, US
- Batted: Right Threw: Right

MLB debut
- August 20, 1919, for the Chicago Cubs

Last MLB appearance
- April 23, 1920, for the Chicago Cubs

MLB statistics
- Win–loss record: 0-1
- Earned run average: 7.27
- Strikeouts: 3
- Stats at Baseball Reference

Teams
- Chicago Cubs (1919–1920)

Joel Inez "Sailor" Newkirk (June 1, 1896 – January 22, 1966) was a pitcher in Major League Baseball. He played for the Chicago Cubs.

== Life ==
Newkirk was born in Kyana, Indiana, the son of Caleb Wilson Newkirk and his wife, Sarah Florence (née Ray) Newkirk. His younger brother is former Major League Baseball pitcher Floyd Newkirk. Joel served as a Boatswain Mate 1st Class in the United States Naval Reserve during World War I. This is likely what gave him the nickname "Sailor."

He married Vivian Capitola Stiles and they had one daughter.

Newkirk is a descendant of Sergeant Elias Newkirk, who served in the American Revolutionary War, and whose family was among the earliest settlers to Ulster County, New York. Elias's brother, Abraham, was a direct ancestor of Steve Comer, another Major League pitcher, and actor Dash Mihok; this makes both Comer and Mihok 5th cousins, twice removed of Joel.
