= Dennis H. Heeke =

American politician (1927–2009)

Dennis Henry Heeke (September 9, 1927 – August 14, 2009) was an American farmer and politician.

Heeke was born in Dubois, Indiana. He was a farmer and helped organized the Dubois Volunteer Fire Department. Heeke also was involved with the Patoka Lake Regional Water and Sewer District. Heeke served in the Indiana House of Representatives from 1964 to 1998 and was a Democrat. Heeke died at the Memorial Hospital and Health Care Center in Jasper, Indiana.
