= Kyana, Indiana =

kyana., Indiana
- Unincorporated community
- Location within Indiana Location within the United States
- Coordinates: 38°18′18″N 86°46′56″W
- Country: United States
- State: Indiana
- County: Dubois
- Township: Jackson
- Elevation: 502 ft (153 m)
- Time zone: UTC-5 (Eastern (EST))
  - Summer (DST): UTC-4 (EDT)
- ZIP code: 47513
- Area codes: 812, 930
- GNIS feature ID: 437481

Kyana is an unincorporated community located on Indiana State Road 64 in Jackson Township, Dubois County, in the U.S. state of Indiana.

== History ==
Kyana was platted in 1883. The town had its own zip code until 1980. The town was an outgrowth of the construction of the Louisville, Evansville & St. Louis Railroad (now Norfolk Southern). Founded by the Louisville Mining & Manufacturing Company, it bears the abbreviation of its home state (Kentucky), and the termination of the state in which it is located.

A post office was established at Kyana in 1882, and remained in operation until it was discontinued in 1982.

Kyana was the site of a plane crash on August 28, 1948. A two-seat Aeronca training plane piloted by William Mullen Jr. was flying at a low altitude when it suddenly dived into the ground in a field near Kyana. The passenger in the plane, Emil Prechtel of nearby Schnellville, died as a result of injuries from the crash. The pilot survived.

== Notable people ==
Joel Newkirk, Major League pitcher (Chicago Cubs)
