= Saint Anthony, Indiana =

Saint Anthony
- Census Designated Place
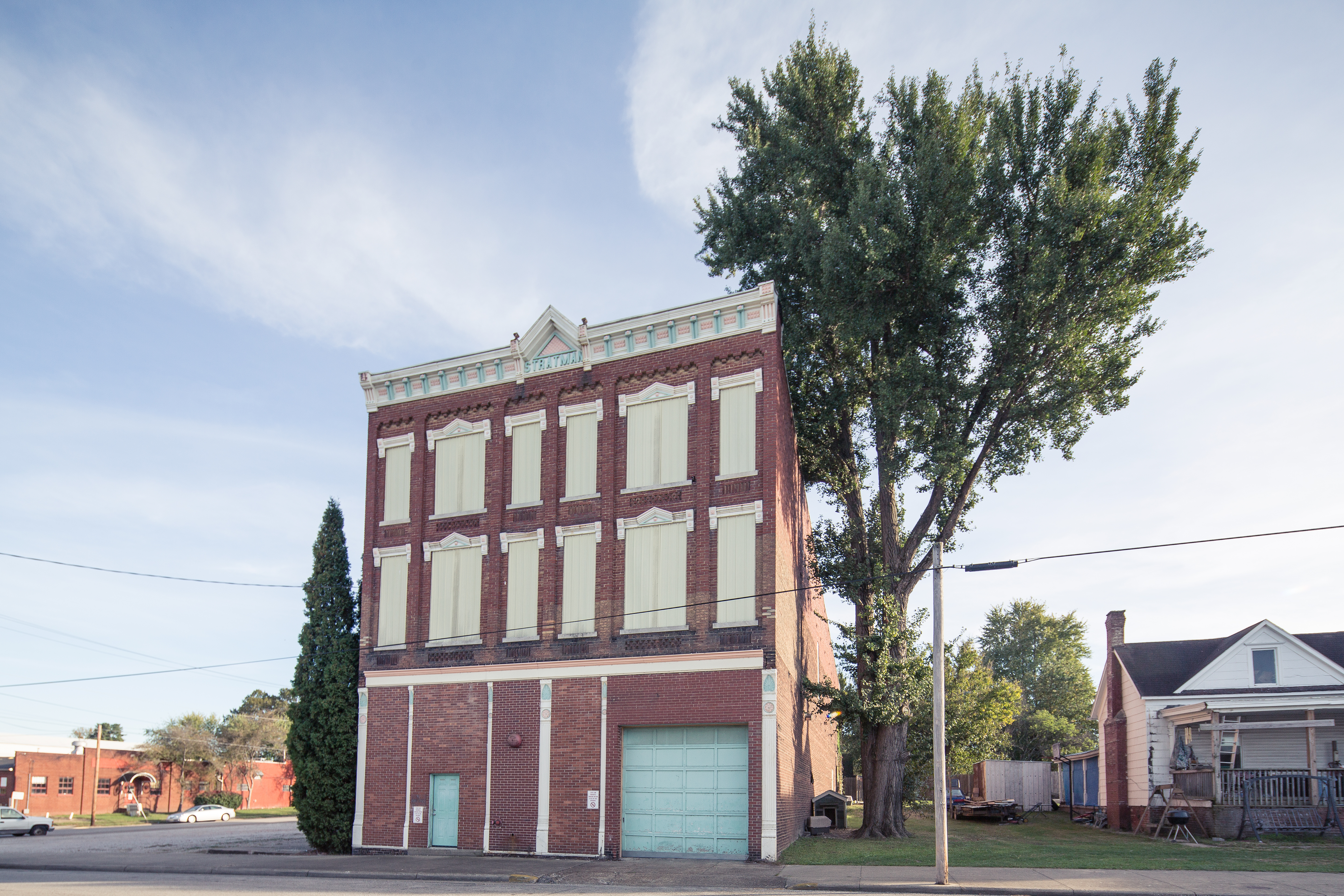

- Location within Indiana Location within the United States
- Coordinates: 38°18′58″N 86°49′35″W
- Country: United States
- State: Indiana
- County: Dubois
- Township: Jackson
- Elevation: 574 ft (175 m)
- Time zone: UTC-5 (EST)
  - Summer (DST): UTC-4 (EDT)
- ZIP code: 47575
- Area code: 812
- FIPS code: 18-66744
- GNIS feature ID: 2830365

Saint Anthony is an unincorporated community in Jackson Township, Dubois County, in the U.S. state of Indiana.

== History ==
St. Anthony, originally known as St. Joseph, was platted in 1860. Its name was changed to its current form in order to secure a post office. The Saint Anthony post office was established in 1874.

== Geography ==
Saint Anthony is part of the Jasper Micropolitan Statistical Area.

== Demographics ==
Historical population
Census	Pop.	Note	%±
2023 (est.)	204

The United States Census Bureau defined Saint Anthony as a census designated place in the 2022 American Community Survey.
