= Birdseye, Indiana =

- Town
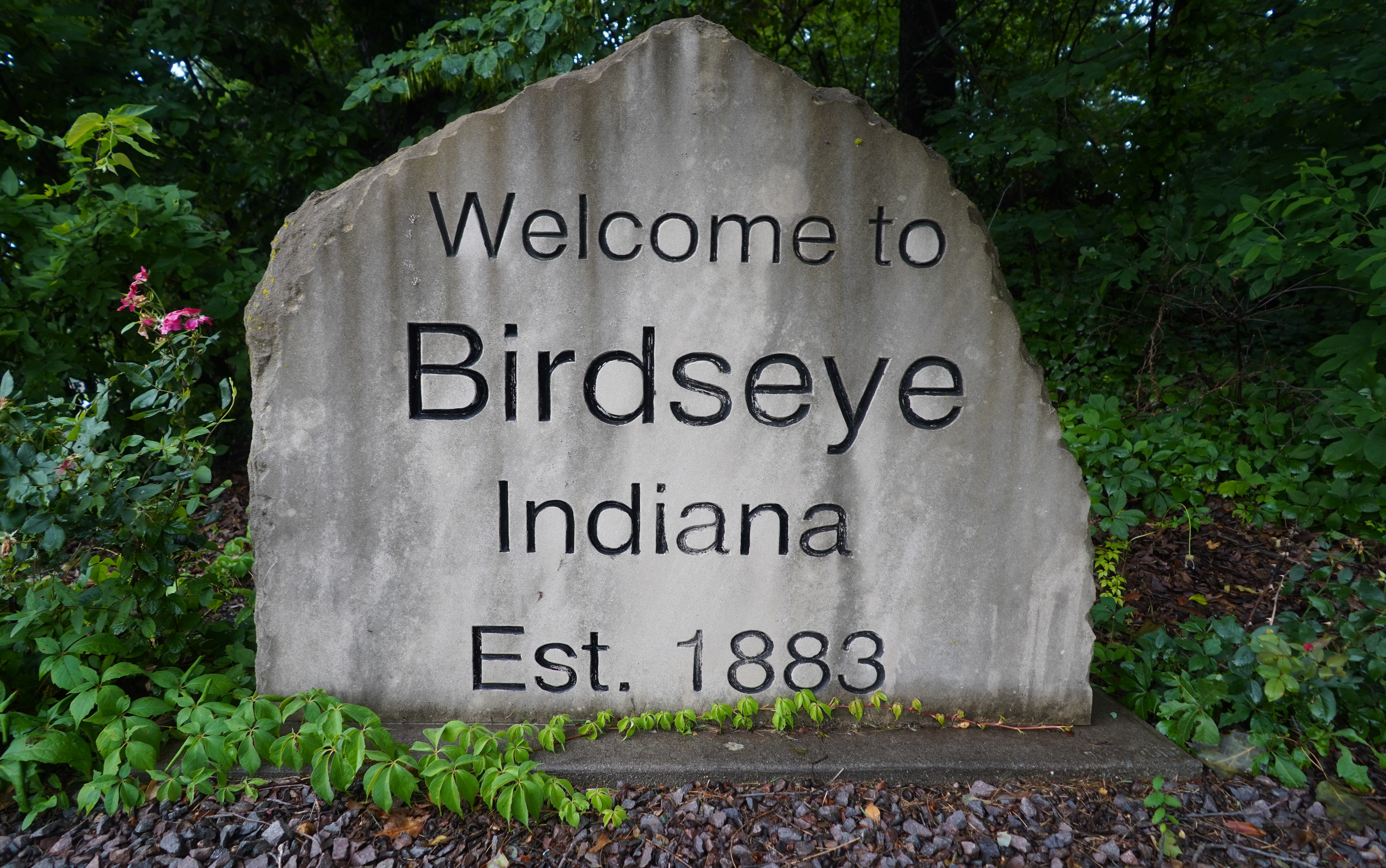
- Birdseye, Indiana

- Location in the state of Indiana
- Coordinates: 38°18′54″N 86°41′46″W
- Country: United States
- State: Indiana
- County: Dubois
- Township: Jefferson
- Established: 1880

Area
  - Total: 0.64 sq mi (1.65 km^{2})
  - Land: 0.64 sq mi (1.65 km^{2})
  - Water: 0 sq mi (0.00 km^{2})
- Elevation: 709 ft (216 m)

Population (2020)
  - Total: 417
  - Density: 655.6/sq mi (253.14/km^{2})
- Time zone: UTC-5 (Eastern (EST))
  - Summer (DST): UTC-5 (EST)
- ZIP code: 47513
- Area code: 812
- FIPS code: 18-05374
- GNIS feature ID: 2396591

Birdseye is a town in Jefferson Township, Dubois County, in the U.S. state of Indiana. At the 2020 census, the town population was 417.

Birdseye is part of the Jasper Micropolitan Statistical Area.

== History ==
Birdseye was platted in 1880. Popular tradition says the town was first known as Bird, after Rev. "Bird" Johnson, who was helping to select a location for the first post office when he said "this spot suits Bird's eye". The Birdseye post office has been in operation since 1856.

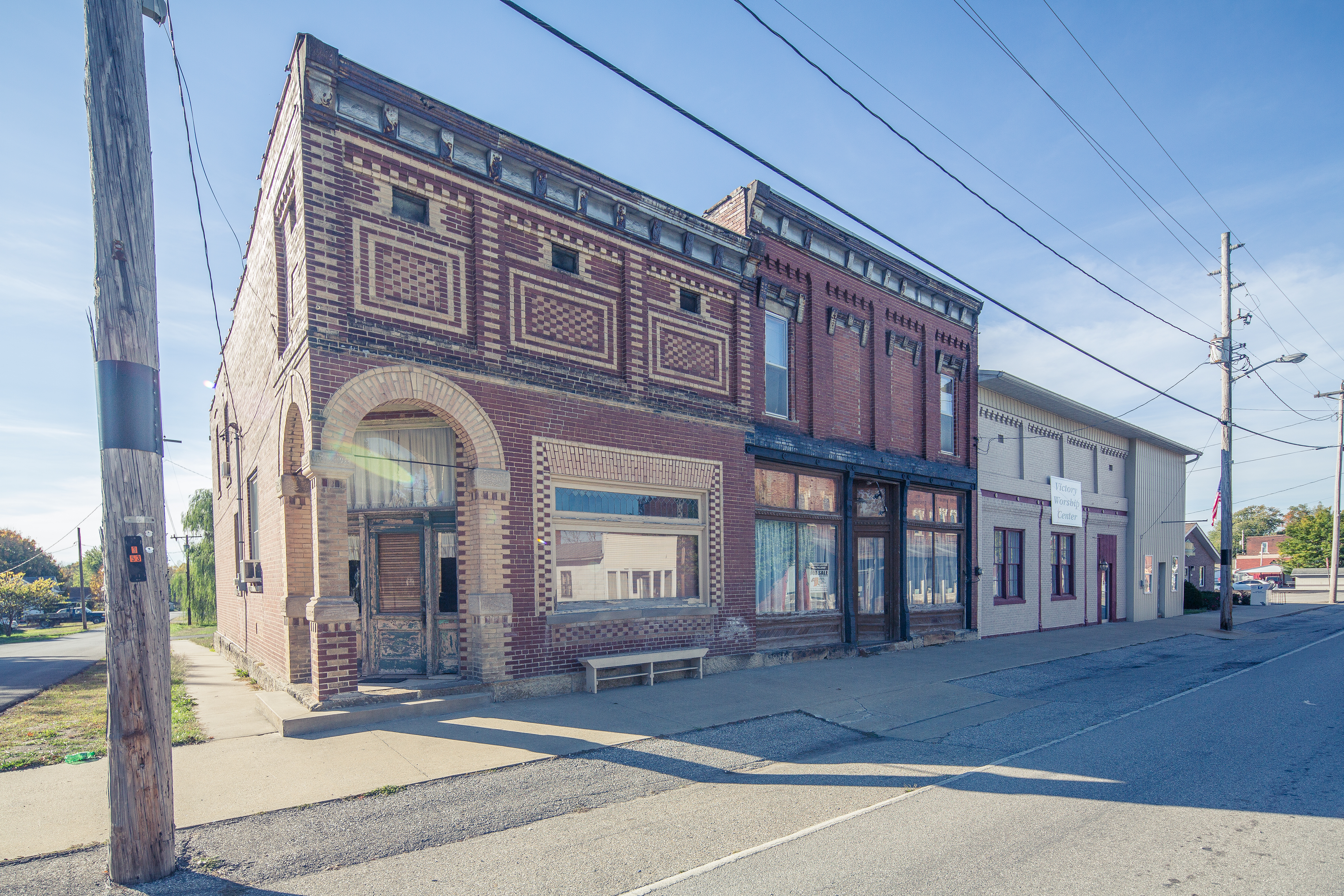
Photo from Small Town Indiana photo survey.

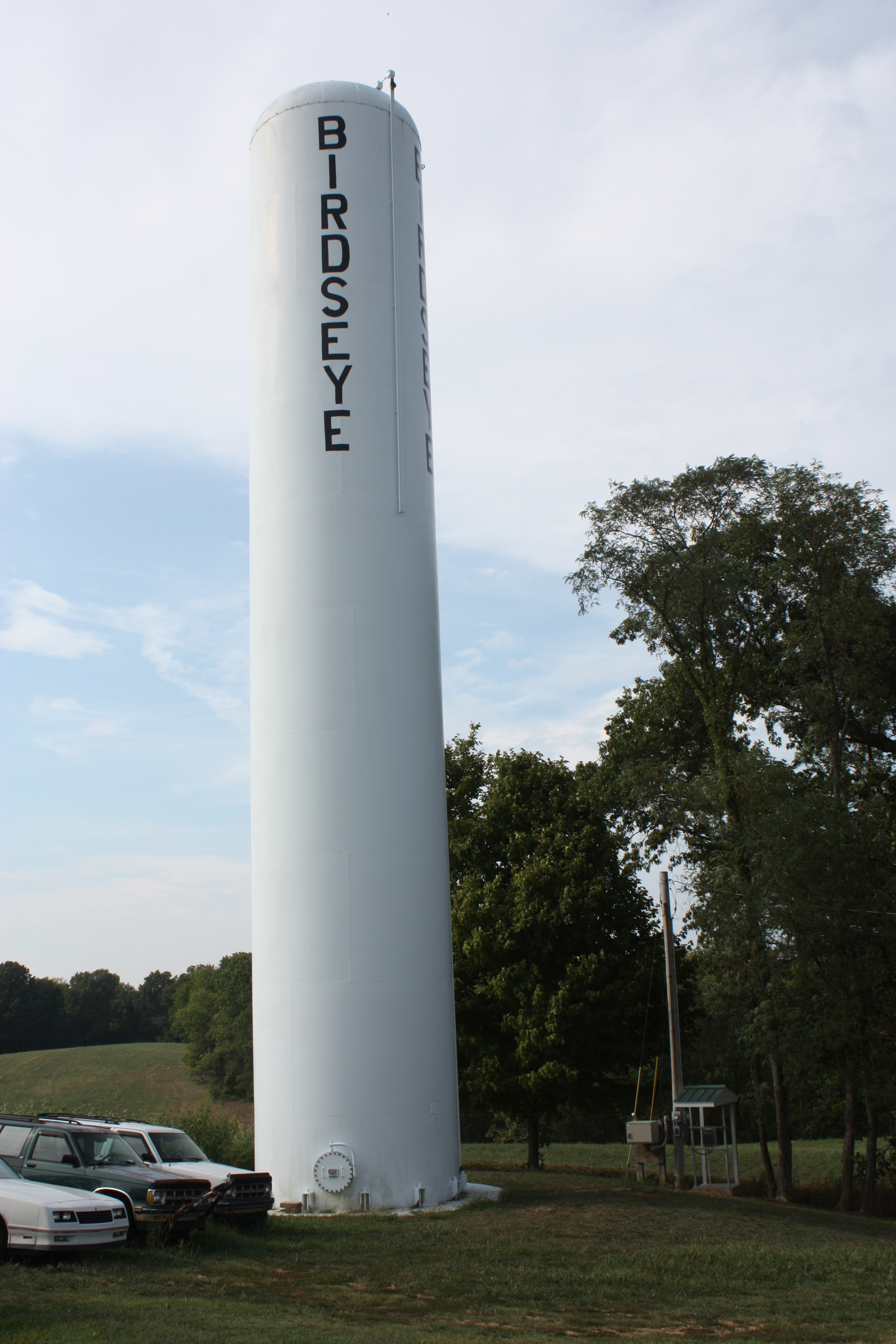
Town water tower

== Geography ==
According to the 2010 US census, Birdseye has a total area of 0.64 square miles (1.66 km^{2}), all land.

== Demographics ==
Historical population
Census	Pop.	Note	%±
1890	419		—
1900	476		13.6%
1910	439		−7.8%
1920	527		20.0%
1930	366		−30.6%
1940	370		1.1%
1950	354		−4.3%
1960	366		3.4%
1970	404		10.4%
1980	533		31.9%
1990	472		−11.4%
2000	465		−1.5%
2010	416		−10.5%
2020	417		0.2%
U.S. Decennial Census

=== 2010 census ===
At the 2010 census, there were 416 people, 173 households and 110 families living in the town. The population density was 650.0 per square mile (251.0/km^{2}). There were 199 housing units at an average density of 310.9 per square mile (120.0/km^{2}). The racial makeup of the town was 98.8% White, 0.5% African American, and 0.7% from two or more races. Hispanic or Latino of any race were 0.5% of the population.

There were 173 households, of which 33.5% had children under the age of 18 living with them, 48.0% were married couples living together, 10.4% had a female householder with no husband present, 5.2% had a male householder with no wife present, and 36.4% were non-families. 34.1% of all households were made up of individuals, and 16.2% had someone living alone who was 65 years of age or older. The average household size was 2.40 and the average family size was 3.09.

The median age was 38 years. 26.9% of residents were under the age of 18; 8.5% were between the ages of 18 and 24; 23.1% were from 25 to 44; 26.7% were from 45 to 64; and 14.9% were 65 years of age or older. The gender makeup was 46.9% male and 53.1% female.

=== 2000 census ===
At the 2000 census, there were 465 people, 204 households and 125 families living in the town. The population density was 724.8 inhabitants per square mile (279.8/km^{2}). There were 213 housing units at an average density of 332.0 per square mile (128.2/km^{2}). The racial makeup was 97.63% White, 0.22% Native American, 0.22% Asian, 0.22% from other races, and 1.72% from two or more races. Hispanic or Latino of any race were 1.51% of the population.

There were 204 households, of which 33.8% had children under the age of 18 living with them, 48.5% were married couples living together, 9.3% had a female householder with no husband present, and 38.7% were non-families. 36.3% of all households were made up of individuals, and 18.1% had someone living alone who was 65 years of age or older. The average household size was 2.28 and the average family size was 2.98.

26.7% of the population were under the age of 18, 8.0% from 18 to 24, 31.0% from 25 to 44, 19.4% from 45 to 64, and 15.1% who were 65 years of age or older. The median age was 37 years. For every 100 females, there were 103.1 males. For every 100 females age 18 and over, there were 92.7 males.

The median household income was $30,156 and the median family income was $45,125. Males had a median income of $29,250 and females $21,953. The per capita income was $13,690. About 8.8% of families and 14.0% of the population were below the poverty line, including 14.7% of those under age 18 and 18.0% of those age 65 or over.

== Education ==
The community is in the Southeast Dubois County School Corporation. It operates Forest Park High School.

Prior to 1971, the community had its own high school. The mascot was the yellowjackets, and the school colors were black and gold. In 1971 the school merged into Forest Park High.

The town has a public library, a branch of the Jasper-Dubois County Public Library.

== Notable people ==
- Frank Nash, renowned bank robber of the 1920s; killed in the Kansas City Massacre
