= Patoka Township, Dubois County, Indiana =

Patoka Township Dubois County
- Township
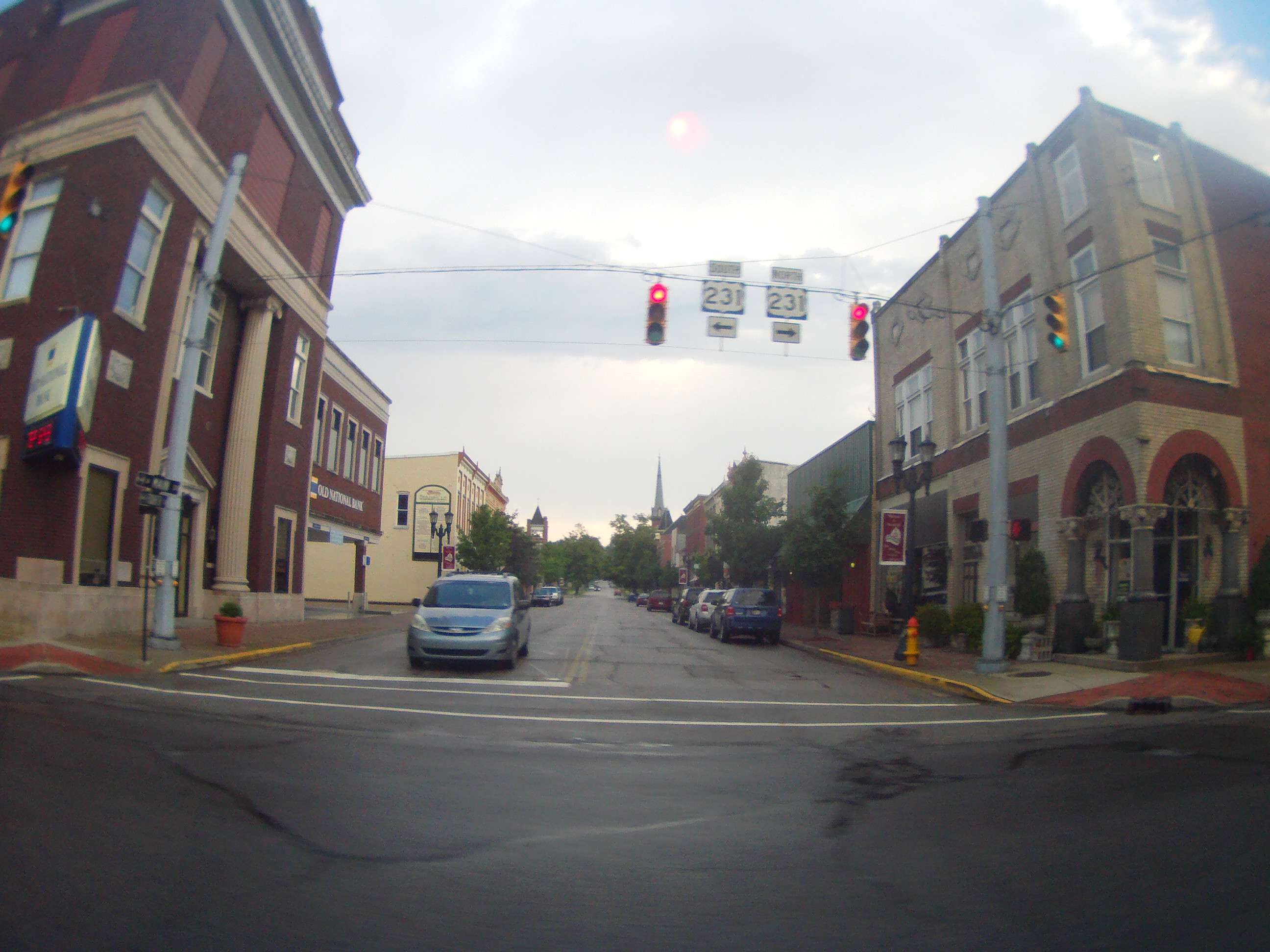
- Downtown Huntingburg, in Patoka Township

- Location of Patoka Township in Dubois County
- Coordinates: 38°18′08″N 86°58′51″W
- Country: United States
- State: Indiana
- County: Dubois

Government
  - Type: Indiana township

Area
  - Total: 39.83 sq mi (103.2 km^{2})
  - Land: 39.26 sq mi (101.7 km^{2})
  - Water: 0.57 sq mi (1.5 km^{2})
- Elevation: 466 ft (142 m)

Population (2020)
  - Total: 7,798
  - Density: 191.7/sq mi (74.0/km^{2})
- FIPS code: 18-58302
- GNIS feature ID: 453708

Patoka Township is one of twelve townships in Dubois County, Indiana. As of the 2010 census its population was 7,527 and it contained 3,056 housing units.

== Geography ==
According to the 2010 census the township has a total area of 39.83 square miles (103.2 km^{2}), of which 39.26 square miles (101.7 km^{2}) (or 98.57%) is land and 0.57 square miles (1.5 km^{2}) (or 1.43%) is water. Knebel Lake is in this township.

=== Cities and towns ===
- Huntingburg

=== Unincorporated towns ===
- Duff

=== Adjacent townships ===
- Bainbridge Township (northeast)
- Jackson Township (east)
- Ferdinand Township (southeast)
- Cass Township (south)
- Lockhart Township, Pike County (west)
- Madison Township (northwest)
- Marion Township, Pike County (northwest)

=== Major highways ===
- U.S. Route 231
- Indiana State Road 64
- Indiana State Road 161

=== Cemeteries ===
The township contains three cemeteries: Central, Fairmount and Mayo.
