= Hillham, Indiana =

- Unincorporated community
- Location within Indiana Location within the United States
- Coordinates: 38°30′50″N 86°42′02″W
- Country: United States
- State: Indiana
- County: Dubois
- Township: Columbia
- Elevation: 558 ft (170 m)
- Time zone: UTC-5 (Eastern (EST))
  - Summer (DST): UTC-4 (EDT)
- ZIP code: 47432
- Area codes: 812, 930
- FIPS code: 18-33808
- GNIS feature ID: 436212

Hillham is an unincorporated community in Columbia Township, Dubois County, in the U.S. state of Indiana.

== History ==
Hillham was not platted. A post office was established at Hillham in 1864, and remained in operation until it was discontinued in 1937.
