= Schnellville, Indiana =

- Census Designated Place
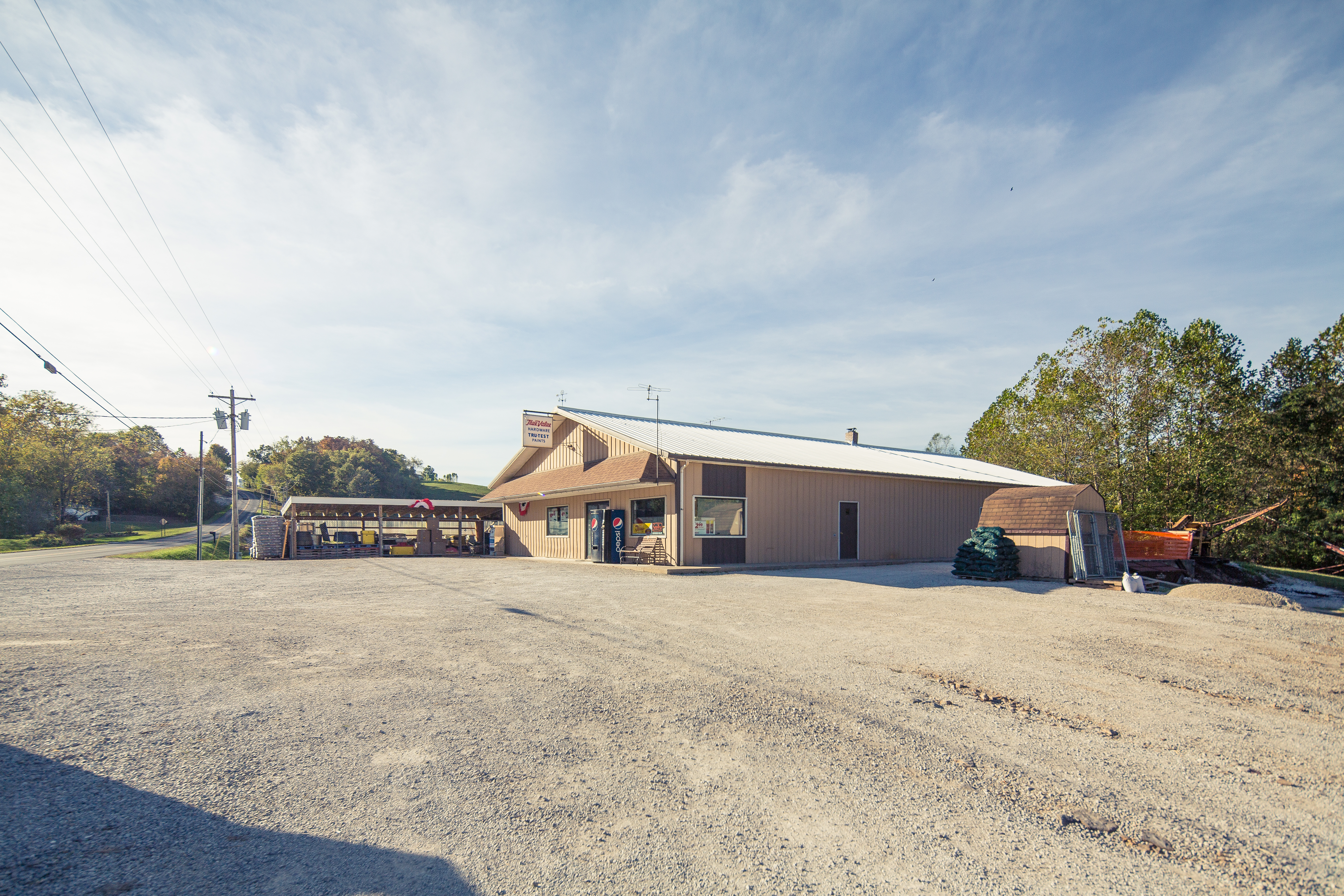

- Location within Indiana Location within the United States
- Coordinates: 38°20′32″N 86°45′31″W
- Country: United States
- State: Indiana
- County: Dubois
- Township: Jefferson
- Elevation: 640 ft (200 m)

Population (2000)
  - Total: 171
- Time zone: UTC-5 (Eastern (EST))
  - Summer (DST): UTC-4 (EDT)
- ZIP code: 47580
- Area codes: 812, 930
- FIPS code: 18-68256
- GNIS feature ID: 2830366

Schnellville is an unincorporated community in Jefferson Township, Dubois County, in the U.S. state of Indiana.

== History ==
Schnellville was founded by a German named Henry Schnell, born October 22, 1821, in Hesse, Germany to Henry and Marie Schnell. At the age of 25, he set off to find a new home. After reaching the United States, he found work on a steamboat, the railroad and the Erie Canal. He then returned to Germany to discover that his wife and son had died. After hearing this news, he returned to the United States and settled in Dubois County after purchasing 40 acres (160,000 m^{2}) of land. He then sold the land a few years later and moved to Louisville, Kentucky. After three years there, he returned to Dubois County, bought a farm and kept a country store. He then sold the farm one year later and bought another, two years after, to return to farming. Henry's dream came true after he found a plot of land that he could see would develop into a town. The first post office was established under the name Worth, which ran from 1848 to 1861. On November 27, 1865, the town of Schnellville was platted, and a new post office was established in 1869, which ran until it was discontinued in 1962.

Henry Schnell built a saw and flour mill in 1876 along with the purchase of 500-600 acres of farmland. On May 25, 1900, Henry was laid to rest in the Schnellville cemetery. In the year of 1873, a group of men went to visit Bishop St. Palais while he was confirming children in Dubois County, regarding a petition for starting a new parish in their own town of Schnellville. On November 10, 1873, Sacred Heart Parish was formed after the Bishop had granted permission. The church had a frame of 40-foot (12 m) by 60-foot (18 m) with a 20-foot (6.1 m) ceiling. The cupola in the front of the church was built to a height of 65 feet (20 m) above the ground. The total cost would be $1,600 and would be completed on November 1, 1874. On April 24, 1898, all the records and personal property were completely destroyed by fire. The current priest, Father John Schueth, visited all the families of the parish to get to know them and ask for donations to build a new church. He petitioned the request for a new church to the Bishop and received a quick reply granting permission. The members of the community volunteered in the construction of the new church. The church was completed on October 24, 1916. It took a total of 25 months to complete the project.

Schnellville also built a school in 1903 to replace the old two-room school building. Most of the teachers there were the Sisters of St. Benedict of Ferdinand, Indiana. In 1947, the school set up a cafeteria in the basement of the church to feed the 50-60 students for $.25 per meal.

== Demographics ==
Historical population
Census	Pop.	Note	%±
2023 (est.)	137

The United States Census Bureau defined Schnellville as a census designated place in the 2022 American Community Survey.
