= Crystal, Indiana =

- Unincorporated community
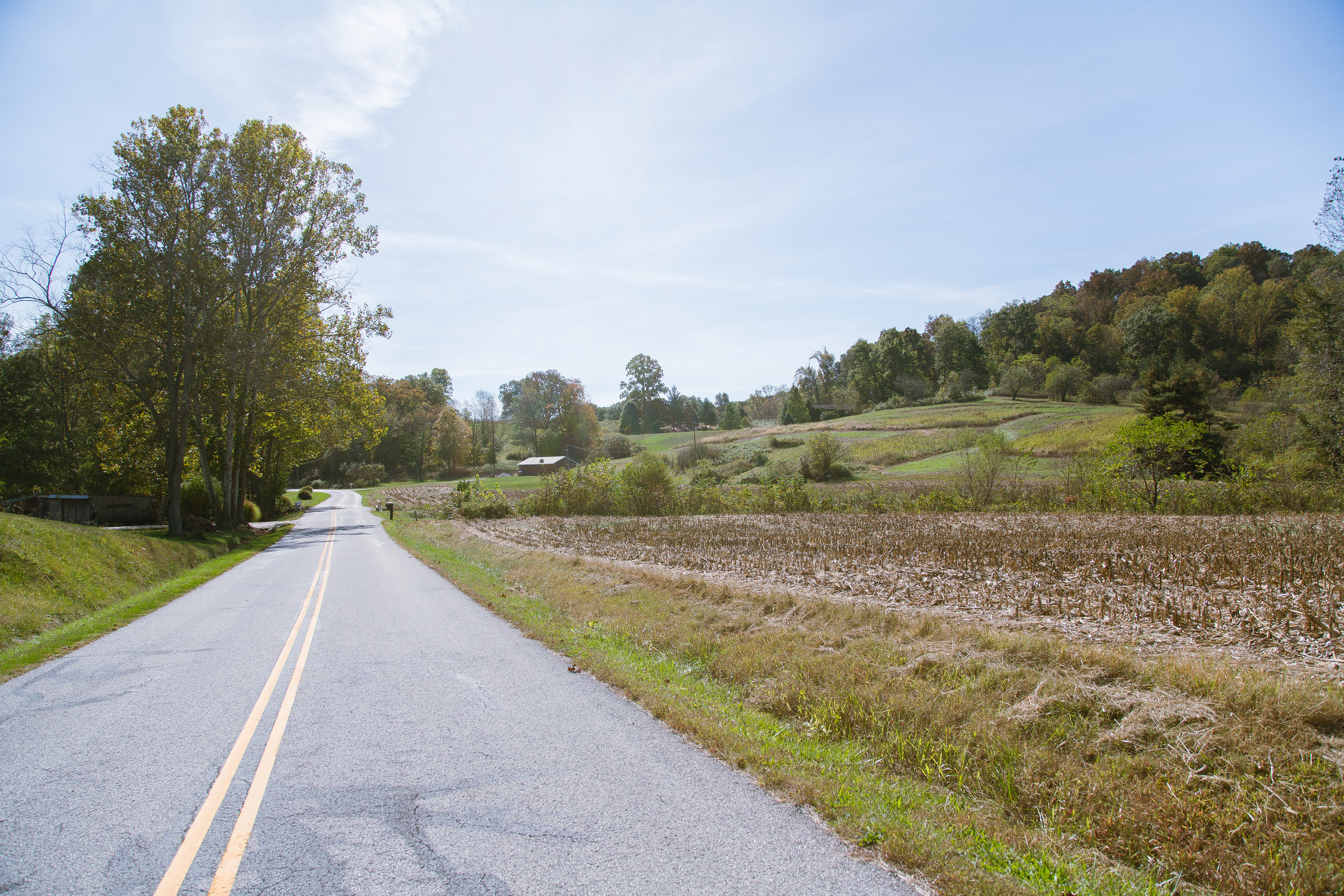

- Location within Indiana Location within the United States
- Coordinates: 38°29′31″N 86°45′14″W
- Country: United States
- State: Indiana
- County: Dubois
- Township: Columbia
- Elevation: 509 ft (155 m)
- Time zone: UTC-5 (Eastern (EST))
  - Summer (DST): UTC-4 (EDT)
- ZIP code: 47527
- Area codes: 812, 930
- FIPS code: 18-16228
- GNIS feature ID: 450824

Crystal is an unincorporated community in Columbia Township, Dubois County, in the U.S. state of Indiana.

== History ==
Crystal was not platted. A post office was established at Crystal in 1889, and remained in operation until it was discontinued in 1919.
