= Jackson Township, Orange County, Indiana =

Jackson Township
- Township
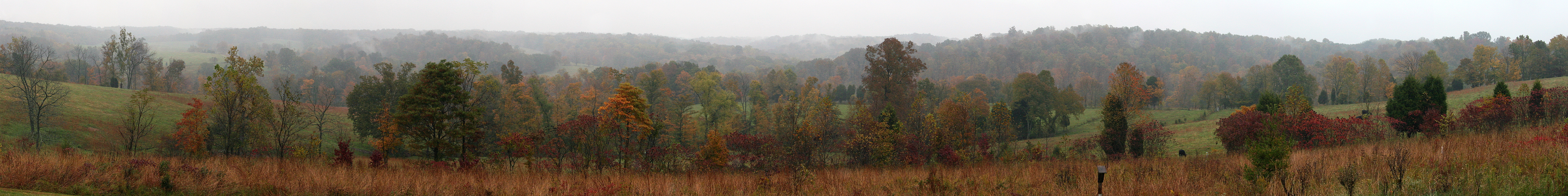
- The Hoosier National Forest in eastern Jackson.

- Location in Orange County
- Coordinates: 38°26′58″N 86°37′10″W
- Country: United States
- State: Indiana
- County: Orange

Government
  - Type: Indiana township

Area
  - Total: 42.57 sq mi (110.3 km^{2})
  - Land: 35.75 sq mi (92.6 km^{2})
  - Water: 6.82 sq mi (17.7 km^{2}) 16.02%
- Elevation: 574 ft (175 m)

Population (2020)
  - Total: 740
  - Density: 21/sq mi (8.0/km^{2})
- Time zone: UTC-5 (Eastern (EST))
  - Summer (DST): UTC-4 (EDT)
- ZIP codes: 47118, 47175, 47432, 47454
- Area codes: 812, 930
- GNIS feature ID: 453458

Jackson Township is one of ten townships in Orange County, Indiana, United States. As of the 2020 census, its population was 740 and it contained 399 housing units.

Historical population
Census	Pop.	Note	%±
1890	1,372		—
1900	1,415		3.1%
1910	1,331		−5.9%
1920	1,269		−4.7%
1930	924		−27.2%
1940	894		−3.2%
1950	746		−16.6%
1960	615		−17.6%
1970	474		−22.9%
1980	346		−27.0%
1990	416		20.2%
2000	543		30.5%
2010	686		26.3%
2020	740		7.9%
Source: US Decennial Census

== History ==
Jackson Township was founded in 1831. It was named for President Andrew Jackson.

== Geography ==
According to the 2010 census, the township has a total area of 42.57 square miles (110.3 km^{2}), of which 35.75 square miles (92.6 km^{2}) (or 83.98%) is land and 6.82 square miles (17.7 km^{2}) (or 16.02%) is water.

=== Cemeteries ===
The township contains these three cemeteries: Patoka Memorial, Cane Creek, Patoka Memorial and Swift.

=== Major highways ===
- Indiana State Road 145

=== Lakes ===
- Patoka Lake

== School districts ==
- Springs Valley Community School Corporation

== Political districts ==
- Indiana's 9th congressional district
- State House District 62
- State Senate District 48
