= Dubois, Indiana =

- Census-designated place
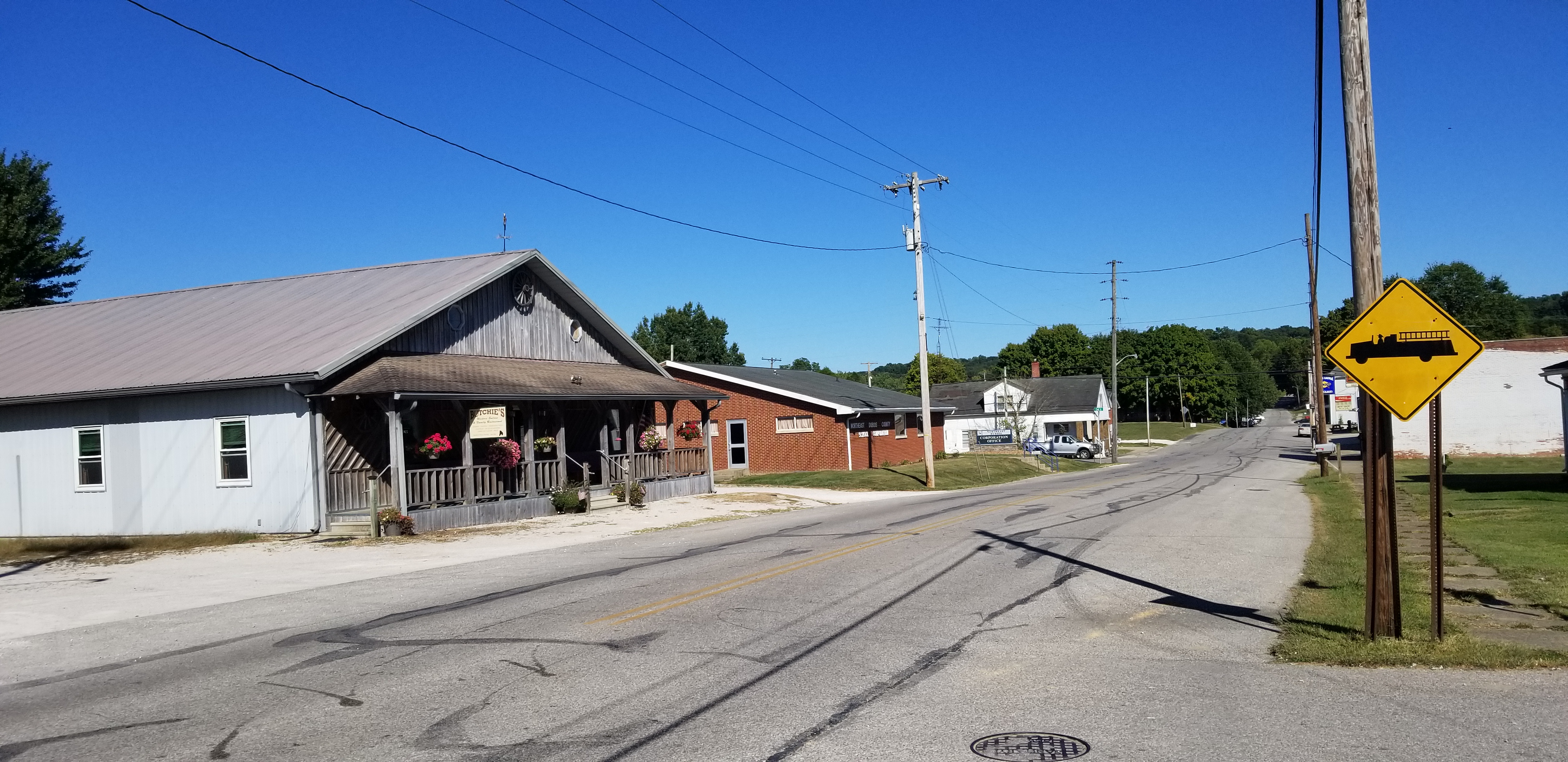

- Location of Dubois in Dubois County, Indiana.
- Coordinates: 38°26′45″N 86°47′52″W
- Country: United States
- State: Indiana
- County: Dubois
- Townships: Harbison, Marion, Columbia

Area
  - Total: 1.60 sq mi (4.14 km^{2})
  - Land: 1.57 sq mi (4.07 km^{2})
  - Water: 0.023 sq mi (0.06 km^{2})
- Elevation: 584 ft (178 m)

Population (2020)
  - Total: 478
  - Density: 304.0/sq mi (117.36/km^{2})
- Time zone: UTC-5 (Eastern (EST))
  - Summer (DST): UTC-4 (EDT)
- ZIP code: 47527
- Area codes: 812, 930
- FIPS code: 18-18784
- GNIS feature ID: 2629882

Dubois is an unincorporated town and census-designated place (CDP) in Dubois County, Indiana, United States. As of the 2020 census, Dubois had a population of 478.

== History ==
Dubois was platted in 1885. It took its name from Dubois County. The Dubois post office was established in 1880.

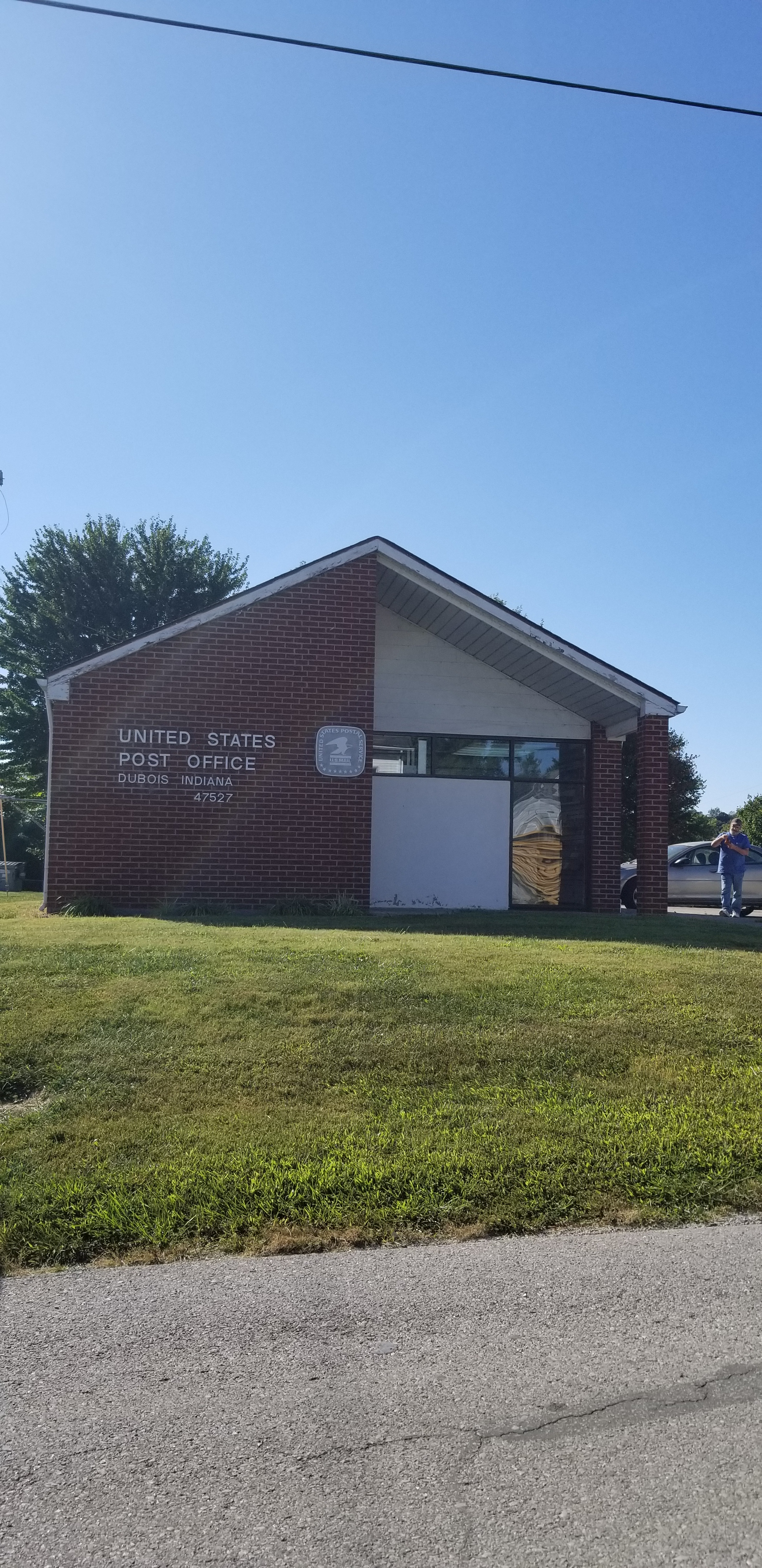
Dubois, Indiana post office

An old variant name of the community was called Knoxville.

Dennis H. Heeke (1927–2009), Indiana state representative and farmer, was born in Dubois.

== Geography ==
The center of the community is split between Marion and Harbison townships, and the CDP area extends eastward into Columbia Township as well. Jasper, the Dubois County seat, is 10 miles (16 km) to the southwest. Indiana State Road 545 passes through Dubois, leading north to State Road 56 and southeast towards Patoka Lake.

According to the U.S. Census Bureau, the Dubois CDP has a total area of 1.60 square miles (4.14 km^{2}), of which 1.57 square miles (4.07 km^{2}) is land and 0.02 square miles (0.06 km^{2}), or 1.55%, is water. The Patoka River, a tributary of the Wabash River, forms the northwestern edge of the community.

== Education ==
The community has a public library, a branch of the Jasper-Dubois County Public Library.

== Demographics ==
Historical population
Census	Pop.	Note	%±
2020	478		—
U.S. Decennial Census
