= Celestine, Indiana =

- Unincorporated community and Census designated place
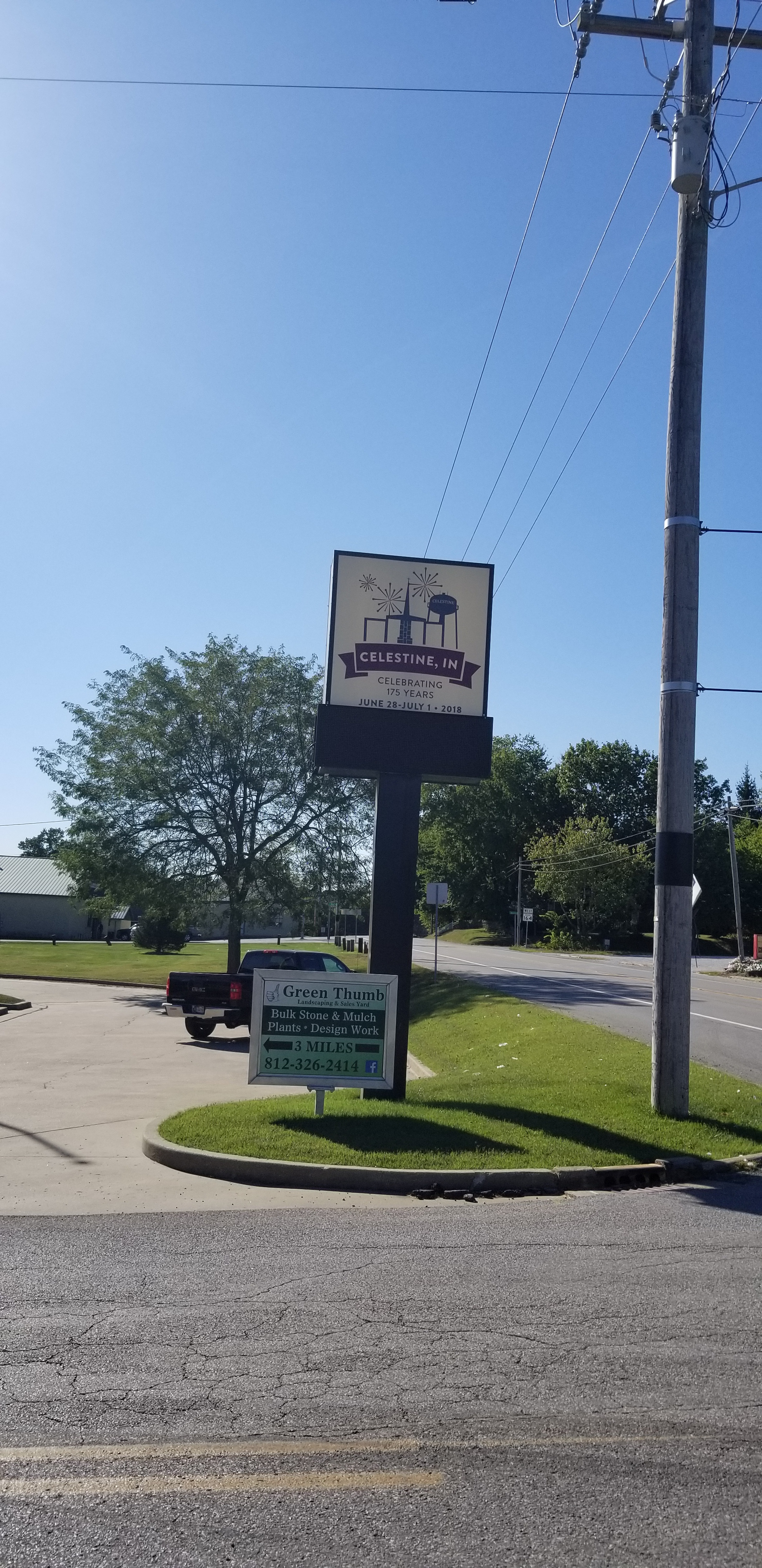

- Location within Indiana Location within the United States
- Coordinates: 38°23′05″N 86°46′45″W
- Country: United States
- State: Indiana
- County: Dubois
- Township: Hall
- "Where Faith & Community Unite": 1843
- Founder: Fr. Joseph Kundek
- Named for: Bishop Célestine René Laurent Guynemer de la Hailandière; Pope St. Celestine V
- Elevation: 646 ft (197 m)

Population (2008)
  - Total: 250
- estimation
- Time zone: UTC-5 (Eastern (EST))
  - Summer (DST): UTC-4 (EDT)
- ZIP code: 47521
- Area codes: 812, 930
- FIPS code: 18-11134
- GNIS feature ID: 2830362
- Website: http://www.celestineindiana.com/

Celestine is an unincorporated community in Hall Township, Dubois County, in the U.S. state of Indiana.

In 2008, the estimated population of Celestine was 250. The community is home to a Roman Catholic church.

== History ==
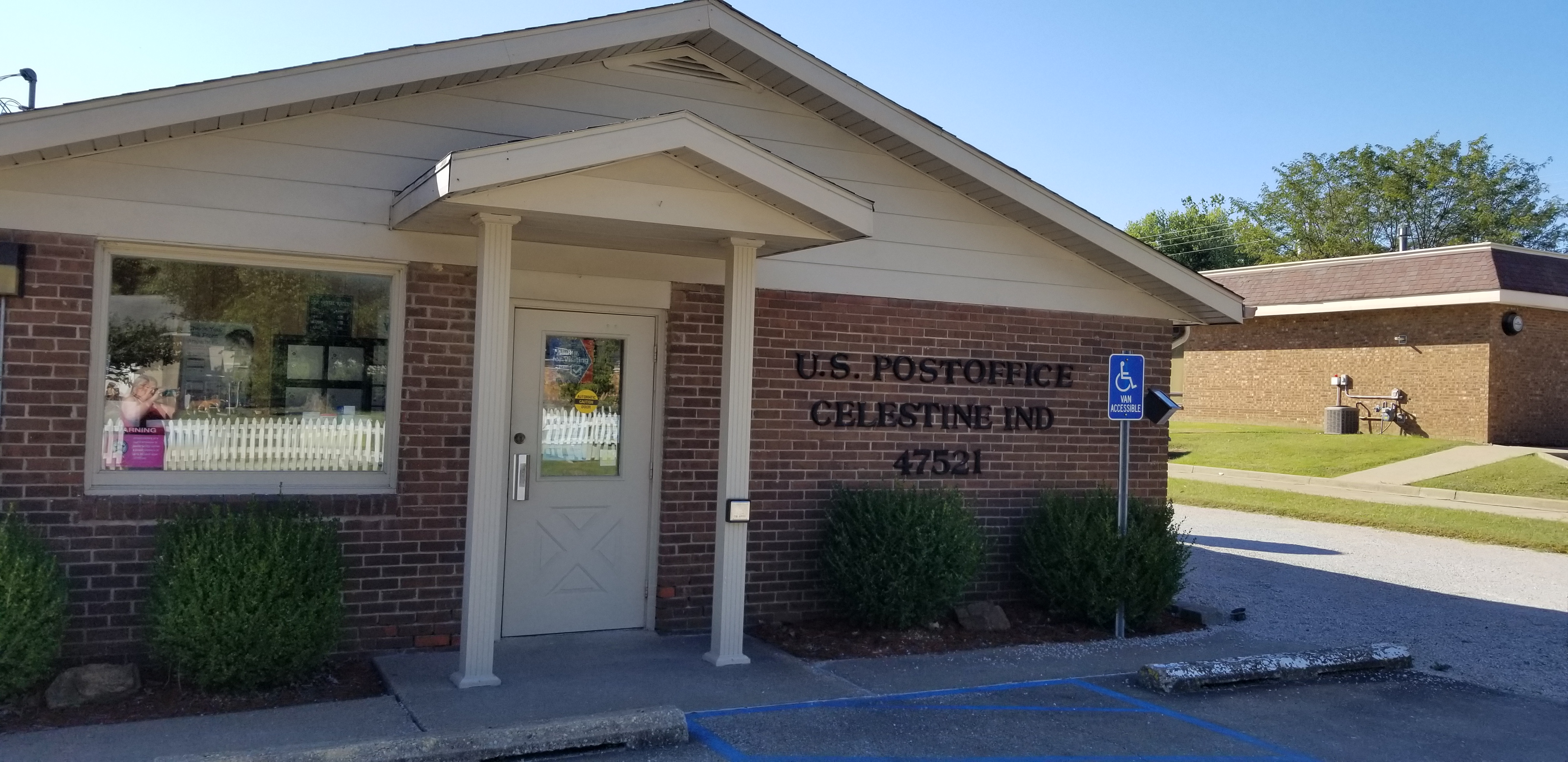
Celestine, Indiana post office

Celestine was platted in 1843. It was named for Rt. Rev. Celestine Rene Lawrence De La Hailandiere, second bishop of the Roman Catholic Diocese of Vincennes, Indiana. The Celestine post office was established in 1851.

On February 28, 2011, a tornado touched down and damaged two homes and a double-wide trailer, the National Weather Service stated.

== Demographics ==
The United States Census Bureau delineated Celestine as a census designated place in the 2022 American Community Survey.

== Schools ==
Celestine was home to Celestine Elementary School. After students completed elementary school, they would go on to attend the Northeast Dubois Middle School and then Highschool. Celestine Elementary was first built in 1922 and, after being closed and sold back to the Catholic Diocese of Evansville in 2020, was demolished on February 12, 2024.

== Climate ==
The climate in this area is characterized by hot, humid summers and generally mild to cool winters. According to the Köppen Climate Classification system, Celestine has a humid subtropical climate, abbreviated "Cfa" on climate maps.
