= Patoka Lake =

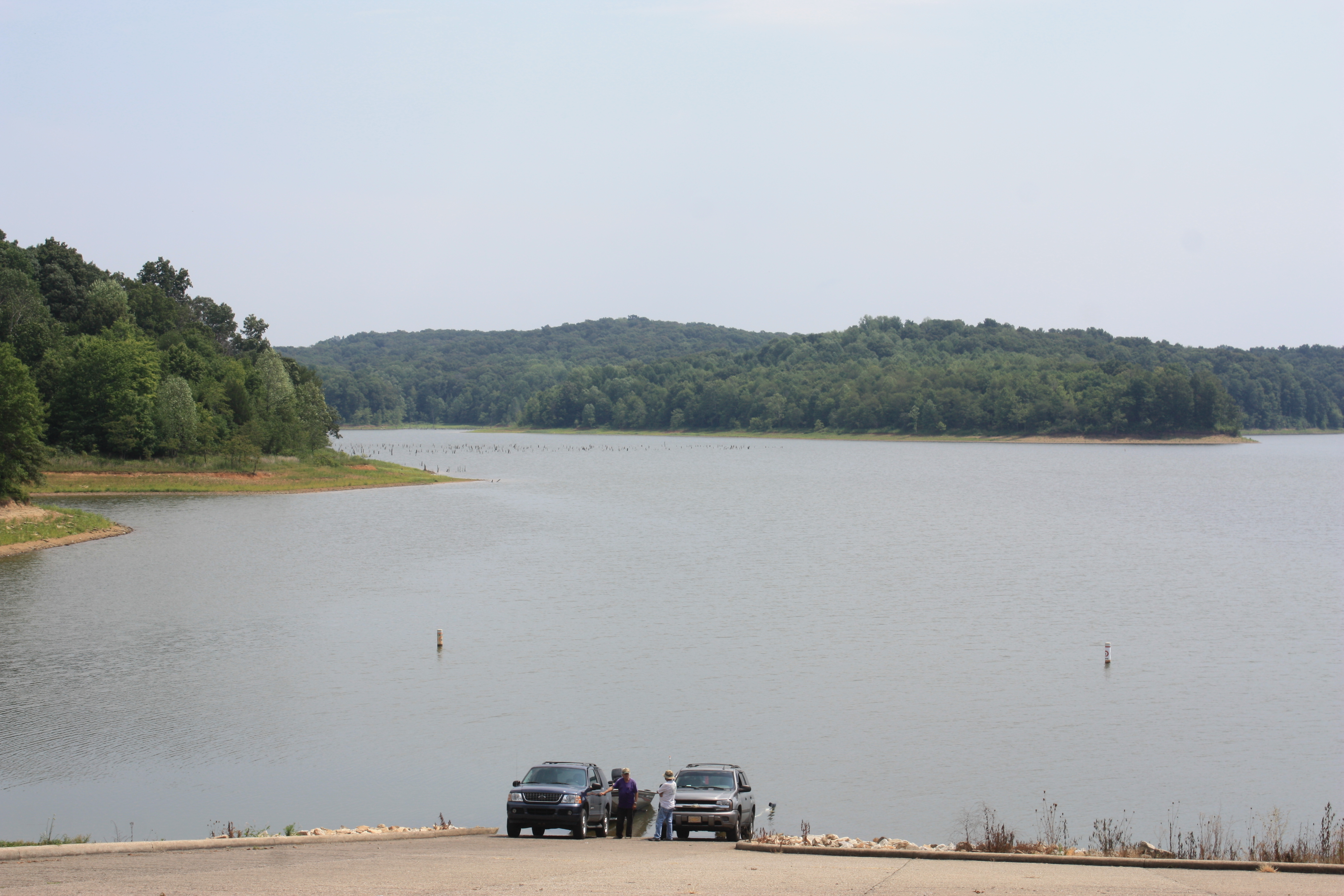

- Location within Indiana Location within the United States
- Location: Crawford / Dubois / Orange counties, Indiana, US
- Coordinates: 38°26′05″N 086°42′25″W
- Type: Reservoir
- Basin countries: United States
- Surface area: 8,800 acres (3,600 ha)
- Surface elevation: 535 ft (163 m)

Patoka Lake is the second largest reservoir in the U.S. state of Indiana (after Monroe Lake) and is spread across Dubois, Crawford, and Orange counties in Southern Indiana.

== Lake ==
Created as a joint effort between the US Army Corps of Engineers and the Indiana Department of Natural Resources, the lake is one of eight such reservoirs built in the state to provide a secure water supply and as a method of flood control. The lake covers 8,800 surface acres (36 km^{2}) of water in the summer.Maximum depth is 52 ft.

The lake was created by damming the Patoka River about 118.3 miles (190.4 km) above its mouth with the Patoka Lake Dam, a 145 feet (44 m) high rockfill earthen dam that was completed in 1978. The lake is fed by several smaller tributaries including Allen Creek, Painter Creek, and Ritter Creek. After the lake was created several parks and nature preserves were established around it totaling 16,920 acres (68.5 km^{2}). The lake and dam is still managed by a cooperative management team of the Army Corps of Engineers and the Indiana Department of Natural Resources.

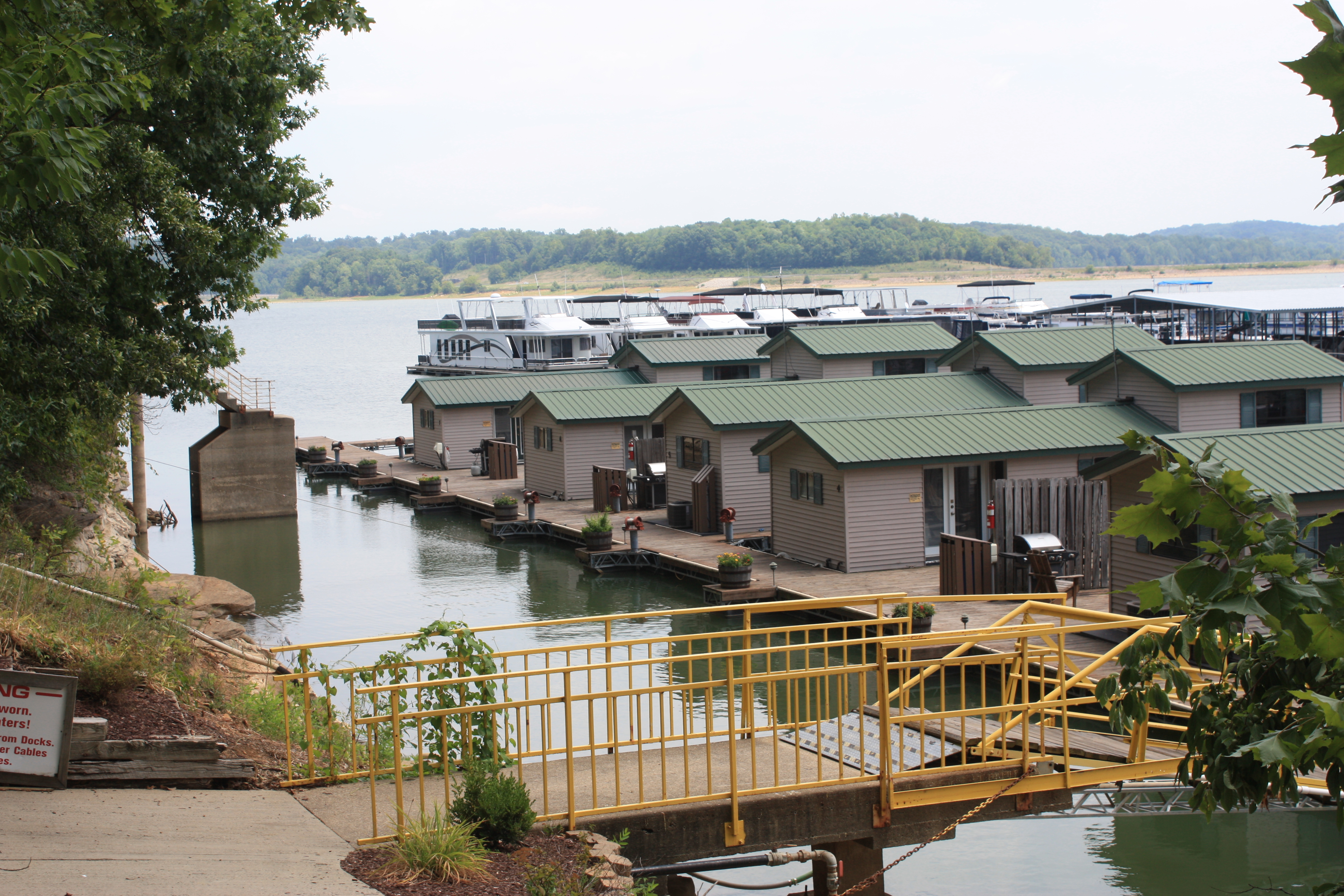
Patoka Lake Marina

Patoka Lake is a great place for photography, as it is inhabited by migrating birds, a large variety of fish and beautiful lake shores. The lake has been heavily stocked with bass, bluegill, catfish, redear, crappie, and walleye. Other facilities include an archery range, boat ramps, a cross-country skiing course, fishing areas (including ice fishing), a disc golf course, trails for hiking and bicycling, hunting areas, interpretive and recreational programs, star parties, picnic shelters, swimming areas, and waterskiing zones. The lake also hosts a large campground with over 500 camping sites.

Patoka Lake has been very beneficial to the surrounding community and the state of Indiana. The lake has generated over $19.4 million in revenue and visitor expenditures in 2005 and has so far prevented over $88 million in flood damage. In 2006 the lake saw 648,738 visitors who provide jobs for 197 local residents.
