= Northeast Dubois High School =

Northeast Dubois Jr/Sr High

Location
- 4711 N Dubois Rd NE; Dubois, Indiana 47527; United States; 38.4495586°N 86.7970575°W

Information
- Type: Public high school
- School district: Northeast Dubois County School Corporation
- NCES School ID: 180812001393
- Principal: Tara Rasche
- Faculty: 27.50 (FTE)
- Grades: 7–12
- Enrollment: 373 (2023–24)
- Student to teacher ratio: 13.56
- Color
- Athletics conference: Blue Chip Conference
- Mascot: Eugene the Jeep
- Website: high.nedubois.k12.in.us

Northeast Dubois Jr/Sr High School is a secondary school in Dubois, Indiana, United States.

== Athletics ==
Northeast Dubois Jr/Sr High School's athletic nickname is the "Jeeps" after Eugene the Jeep, a character in the Popeye comic strip. The school participates in the Blue Chip Conference and is known for their athletics programs, which include at least 13 sectionals, five regionals, one semi-state, and one state appearance.

== See also ==
- List of high schools in Indiana
