= Merry Moor Winnett =

American photographer

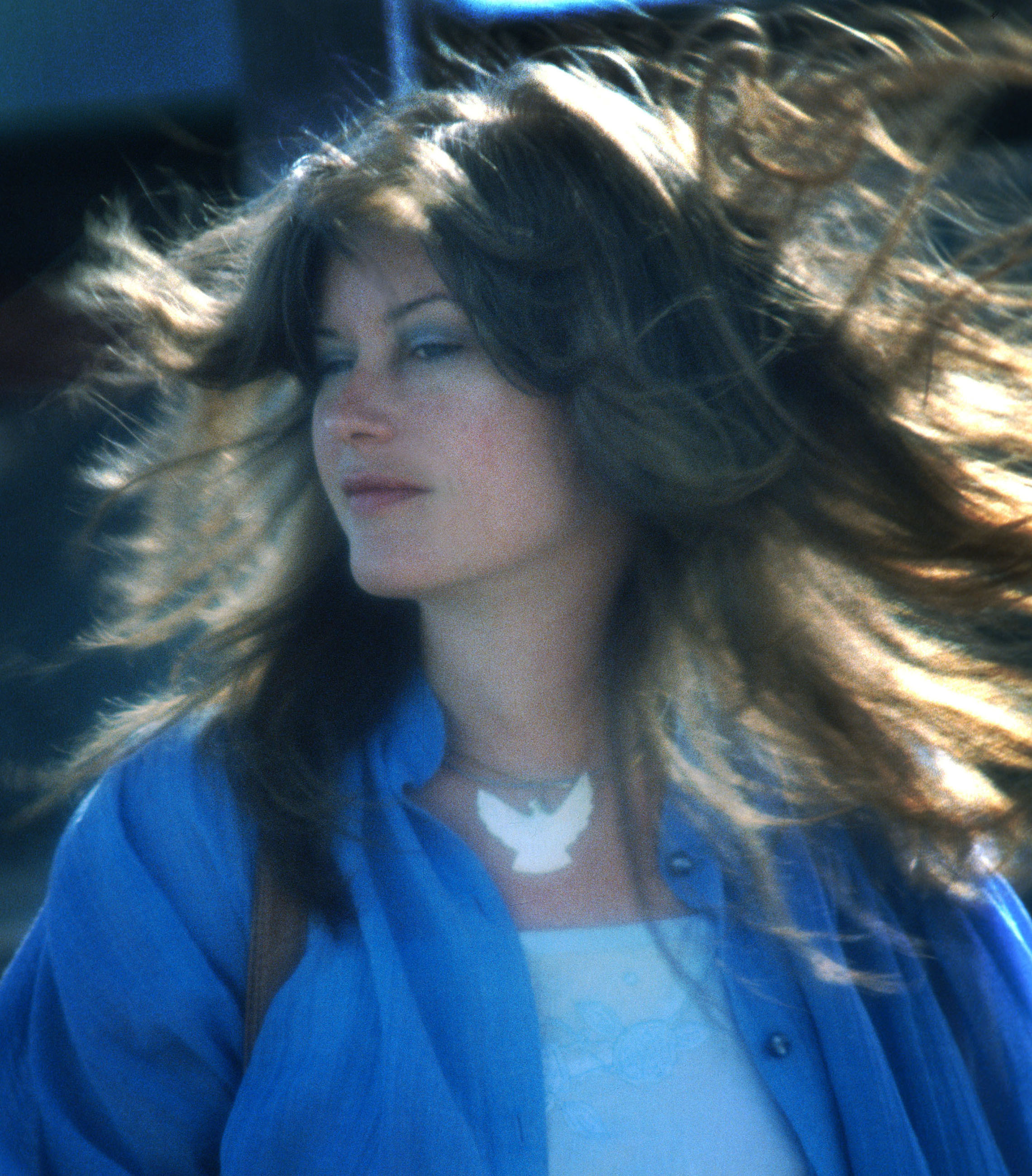
- Winnett in 1975
- Born: November 24, 1951; Newport News, Virginia
- Died: October 17, 1994 (aged 42); North Carolina
- Education: Michigan State University; University of South Florida
- Known for: Experimental photography

Merry (Moor) Winnett (1951–1994) was an American photographer noted for experimental imagery.

== Early life and education ==
Merry Moor was born on November 24, 1951, in Newport News, Virginia to Florence Corinne Davidson and Willard L. Moor. After her parents divorced in 1973, she and her brother lived with their mother in Tampa, Florida. She attended Arthur Hill High School in Saginaw, Michigan between 1964 and 1969, then went on to Michigan State University and the University of South Florida, graduating with a Bachelor of Arts in Visual Art in 1975, magna cum laude.

== Career ==
=== Early career ===
Between 1974 and 1975, Winnett's first solo art exhibits at the University of South Florida (USF) were displays of unconventional photographic prints characterized by art reviewer Angelo Resciniti as a "no-holds barred" show.

The techniques Winnett used included Van Dyke brown, composite printing, collage, solarization, split-toning, stitching, tinting, and infrared. An influence on Winnett was the printmaker Donald Saff, who in 1971 had been named the Dean of Fine Arts at USF. He encouraged experimentation with all media including photography as a tribute to his colleague Robert Rauschenberg, who lived nearby in Captiva. Until the mid-1960s, fine arts majors at most colleges and universities were not permitted to concentrate in photography. Winnett, who had been interested in photography since childhood, was enthusiastic about the new policies at USF.

=== Later career ===
By the late 1970s, Winnett had won awards in photography competitions in Florida. After relocating to North Carolina, she won two prizes in her first NC competition. During the next fourteen years, she gained international recognition and produced a body of work showcasing her techniques and imagery.

Throughout her career, she used a 35 mm Minolta camera, model SRT 101, with a Minolta 21 mm lens along with Kodak Plus-X or infrared film. Winnett was inspired by a wide range of topics including physics, mythology, popular culture, botany, art history, and science fiction.

Winnett's best known photographs were part of The Moon Series, also called Moonstruck. Over half of the photographs in this series were inspired by a class (The Moon, Fact and Fancy) that she team-taught at Guilford College in 1991. During this time, she was diagnosed with cancer at the age of 39.

In her last two years, she continued to teach and produce photographs. In early 1994, after winning the Artist of the Year in Winston-Salem, she created a series of seventy-five handmade photographs titled Hurry Home. By using five different negatives and duplicating film, she constructed a large-format, master negative. Later, she made contact prints onto Agfa Portriga paper that were selectively toned with Berg Blue Toner and hand-tinted with Dr. Ph. Martin's Iridescent dyes.

In 1989, Winnett was one of fifteen contemporary women photographers selected from a national search to be featured in the feminist journal The Creative Woman. This issue celebrated the 150th year since the invention of photography with tributes to some outstanding women photographers historically and currently. Winnett wrote her own summary, which revealed how and why she did her artwork. She described her techniques as gender-specific, especially her hand-stitching (sewing) and other decorative embellishments like sequins, ribbons, and metallic foils. She believed that male and female artists have different perspectives even when addressing similar concepts.

Among her feminist artworks is And for Pangaea, a Moon, where she shows two powerful sorcerers/goddesses creating the Moon as participants in the creation of Earth. In Winnett's myth, the Moon's feminist symbolism as the Sun's companion is strengthened by an independent force, ruler of the night sky.

Winnett made three copies of the complex photograph, And for Pangaea, a Moon. One is owned by the Smithsonian Museum of American Art and another is in the Guilford College Permanent Art Collection. Similar works are held at the Southeast Museum of Photography, Chrysler Museum of Art, and Asheville Art Museum.

Stirring the imagination of her audience, a life-long goal for Winnett, was revealed to art reviewers such as Joanne Rodriguez. Winnett's archive contains correspondence with like-minded artists including Clarence John Laughlin and Ray Bradbury who recognized the essential nature of the arts in education and throughout life.

=== Environmental activism ===
Winnett was an active member of the Society for Photographic Education (SPE), which originated in the 1960s, providing a forum for the discussion of photography as a means of creative expression and cultural insight. Conservation of nature was one of the cultural issues that the group advocated.

Members, including Winnett, donated handmade photographs to public institutions within the program titled "Creating Place: North Carolina’s Artworks for State Buildings”. Other environmental activities included discussions of best practices for teaching photography and ways to operate an environmentally safe darkroom.

One of Winnett's environmental landscapes is Twenty Years… (1988), in which a huge moon hovers over dilapidated gasoline pumps labeled NASA and surrounded by overgrown weeds. One interpretation relates to American moon explorations in the late 1960s, when Exxon examined the possibility of replacing fossil fuels (in "twenty years") with minerals (such as He3) harvested from the moon.

== Awards and honors ==
Between 1974 and 1994, Winnett won seventy prizes in national and international competitions from jurors such as Van Deren Coke, Marcia Tucker, Evon Streetman, Jerry Uelsmann, Ellen Land-Weber, Barbara Morgan and Arnold Doren. These exhibitions were held in twenty-eight states and nine European countries.

== Personal life ==
On April 5, 1975, Merry Moor married Tommy Edward Winnett (also a graduate of the University of South Florida). In 1978, his employment was transferred to Greensboro, North Carolina, where the couple resided until her death on October 17, 1994.
