= WJPR =

- Jasper, Indiana; United States
- Frequency: 91.7 MHz
- Branding: 91.7 The Curve

Programming
- Language: English
- Format: Adult album alternative; high school radio

Ownership
- Owner: Jasper High School; (Greater Jasper Consolidated Schools)

History
- First air date: 2005
- Former call signs: WKJR (2003–2006)
- Call sign meaning: Former owner Jasper Public Radio

Technical information
- Licensing authority: FCC
- Facility ID: 79041
- Class: A
- ERP: 2,600 watts
- HAAT: 84 meters (276 ft)
- Transmitter coordinates: 38°25′23.1″N 86°49′46.9″W

Links
- Public license information: Public file; LMS
- Website: www.curveradio.org

WJPR (91.7 FM) is an American non-commercial educational radio station licensed to serve the community of Jasper, Indiana. The station, established in 2005, is owned and operated by Greater Jasper Consolidated Schools, and operates out of Jasper High School. The station is organized through a local board of directors who oversee the station's operation.

== History ==
The station, licensed as WKJR, was assigned the call sign WJPR by the Federal Communications Commission (FCC) on August 2, 2006.

Under Jasper Public Radio, the station aired a classic hits music format featuring hit music of the 1960s, 1970s, and 1980s. WJPR also provides local and national educational programming including Indiana University produced Moment of Science, Moment of Indiana History and Congressional Moments along with various locally produced educational and informative programs. On-Air voice personalities and imaging for the station include Alan Williams and Greg Johnson.

In January 2014, WJPR entered into a partnership with a newly formed multi-media news platform company to supply local audio news content on the air at the top of the hour Monday thru Friday from 6 am to 6 pm. News content was provided by Mick Birge. News Now Dubois County, produced by Star Valley Productions, supplied WJPR with local state and national news, and sports pertinent to Jasper and Dubois County.

In 2022, Jasper Public Radio sold WJPR for $158,000 to Greater Jasper Consolidated Schools, which surrendered low-power FM station WJWS-LP 93.7 to take on the full-service license.
