= Arnold Rosenberg =

Arnold Rosenberg may refer to:

- Arnold L. Rosenberg (born 1941), American computer scientist
- Arnold T. Rosenberg (1931–2017), photographer
