= Farragut Career Academy =

Location
- 2345 S. Christiana Avenue; Chicago, Cook County, Illinois 60623; United States; 41.8495°N 87.7084°W

Information
- School type: Public; Secondary
- Established: 1894
- Status: Open
- School district: Chicago Public Schools
- NCES District ID: 1709930
- CEEB code: 140815
- NCES School ID: 170993000788
- Principal: Virag Nanavati
- Grades: 9–12
- Gender: Co-ed
- Enrollment: 400 (2025–2026)
  - Grade 9: 123 (2023–2024)
  - Grade 10: 115 (2023–2024)
  - Grade 11: 137 (2023–2024)
  - Grade 12: 193 (2023–2024)
- Campus type: Urban
- Colors: Blue; Gold
- Athletics conference: Chicago Public League
- Nickname: Admirals
- Accreditation: North Central Association of Colleges and Schools
- Website: farragutcareeracademy.org

Farragut Career Academy High School is a public 4–year high school located in the Little Village neighborhood on the West Side of Chicago, Illinois, United States. As a career academy, Farragut emphasizes a curriculum that combines academic instruction with work-study experiences and vocational training. In addition to education-to-careers clusters, Farragut is also home to the General Patton JROTC program, which functions as a school-within-a-school. The school's service area includes North Lawndale and South Lawndale.

== History ==
The original Farragut School opened its doors on September 4, 1894, as a new primary school. It was located on Spaulding Ave near 23rd Street in the South Lawndale neighborhood. Its 16 rooms accommodated 900 students. The Chicago Board of Education named the school after Admiral David Farragut and appointed George R. Plumb as principal. On the first day of school, Farragut enrolled about 500 students in grades 1–4. Those 500 students were among 175,000 students enrolled in Chicago's 200 schools in a year that saw a 15% increase in enrollment.

Farragut served as a primary school for thousands of neighborhood students in its early years. Two years after opening Farragut, Plumb officiated at a ceremony to dedicate an oil portrait of Admiral Farragut. The Farragut Post 602 of the Grand Army of the Republic (GAR) presented this portrait to the school on June 26, 1896. The dedication ceremony included speeches by representatives of the Chicago Board of Education and the Grand Army of the Republic and the singing of "patriotic songs" by Farragut students. The portrait of Admiral Farragut still hangs in Farragut's south building. Farragut dismissed Plumb in 1901, replacing him with Mary E. Baker.

In the early years of the 20th century, the population of Chicago's southwest side continued to grow, and overcrowding at Farragut became a problem. To ease this overcrowding, the Chicago Board of Education approved $150,000 to build a sixteen-room addition and assembly hall for Farragut. At the forefront of the construction effort was Farragut Principal Henry C. Cox, who had taken over from Mary Baker in 1904. Cox believed that the primary reason Farragut students did not complete their high school education was a lack of facilities in the area that could accommodate them. The addition opened its doors as a high school at Spaulding and 24th streets on September 7, 1909, with Frank L. Morse as principal. The original building continued to operate as a primary school. One of the most significant challenges to keeping high school students in school during this time was that many teenagers worked in factories around Chicago to supplement their family income. In 1909, Principal Morse created a plan to allow students to continue working, attend school, and still receive pay. In cooperation with such employers as the Chicago Malleable Iron Company, the International Harvester Company, and the Kimball Piano Company, students would alternate weeks between work and school. The school enrolled these students in a unique vocational curriculum to improve their "industrial education." Boys between the ages of 14 and 16 would be enrolled in the program and would receive their full weekly salary while in school.

Young women were also part of the vocational education plan for Farragut, although with a different focus. Classes for girls fell under the category of "domestic sciences" and included beginning and advanced sewing, food study and cooking, sanitation and hygiene in the home, and industry history. As the vocational programs increased in popularity, Farragut expanded quickly. In 1914, most were transferred to the new Harrison Technical High School at 24th Street and Marshall Boulevard. With space now available, Farragut opened its doors as a community center two nights a week. Classrooms were made available for organizations such as the Boy Scouts and Camp Fire Girls. In addition, the school organized adult education classes to teach sewing, millinery, cooking, and typing. In addition, the school offered English language classes free of charge to neighborhood residents. Young people and adults could also participate in sports, music, and art.

In 1924, Farragut underwent another restructuring. The Chicago School Board created a new program that converted several schools into junior high schools housing grades seven and eight. The move was designed to ease overcrowding by reducing some schools from K-8 to K-6 and moving the older students to new schools. In September 1925, 7th- and 8th-grade students from the Farragut, Burns, Spry, and McCormick schools attended classes at Farragut Junior High School with Isabella Dolton as principal. Students at Farragut in grades K-2 stayed in the original building, operating as an extension of the Burns school. The remaining students in grades 3–6 moved to the neighboring schools. By 1928, the continuing problem of school overcrowding led to the construction of an addition to the Farragut building. The plans included a south and west section of the building that effectively doubled its size. That year, Peter B. Ritzma became principal following Isabella Dolton's election as Assistant Superintendent of Schools for the district. Farragut operated as a junior high school until the Chicago School Board decided to scrap the program and convert the junior high schools in the city to senior high schools in 1933. Farragut's attendance boundaries extended north to 16th Street and as far south as the Illinois and Michigan Canal.

Vocational training returned to Farragut in 1935 following the establishment of the Emergency Education Program (EEP) under the Federal Emergency Relief Administration (FERA). In the early years of the Great Depression, thousands of teachers found themselves unemployed and seeking relief. Harry Hopkins, director of FERA, realized there was an opportunity not only to return teachers to work but also to provide educational programs to other unemployed workers. Under the EEP, Farragut began offering adult evening classes free of charge. Unemployed adults could attend classes in typing, dictaphone, shorthand (advanced and beginning), sewing, millwork, and printing.

=== Mid–20th century to present ===
In the post-World War II period, the school demographics changed as more African-Americans moved into the surrounding neighborhoods, which European immigrants and Jews had previously populated; the student body and teaching staff became increasingly African-American. In 1950, the community around Farragut was 91.2% white and 8.6% black—64.4% black and 35.3% white by 1960. Many black students residing in North Lawndale attended Farragut since North Lawndale did not have a senior high school. By 1968 Farragut's student body was about 90% black, and the school was overcrowded since North Lawndale also fed into the school. By 1968–1969 the "New Breed" and other groups of African-American students demanded that the school hire black teachers and administrators and that it fire Joseph Carroll, the principal of the school. Elizabeth Anders, author of "Everybody run Farragut," a 1971 work, stated that the school administration, then dominated by White Americans, was not prepared for the change in demographics and that some teachers had no interest in serving black students; by 1971, according to Anders, discord among teachers and students and problems with gangs occurred by 1971. Around that period some Hispanic and White students had accused groups of black students of harassment.

== Other Information ==
In June 2006, CPS accused Principal Edward Guerra, scheduled to retire from CPS and begin working at Waukegan High School, of changing the grades of soccer players and asking teachers not to say anything about it. On June 8, 2010, Kanye West performed a private concert for Farragut students for having won the third annual "Stay in School" contest. Farragut competed against six other schools: Manley, Harlan, Clemente, Marshall, Julian, and Robeson. The goal was to have the best overall improved attendance, grades, and behavior.

== Admissions ==
Farragut's student body was 80.1% black in 1963 and 91% black by 1968. 43.3% of Farragut teachers were black in 1968.

View source data.

Enrollment by Race/Ethnicity 2023–2024
Hispanic	Black	White	American Indian/Alaska Native
487	75	4	1

== Athletics ==
Farragut competes in the Chicago Public League (CPL) and is a member of the Illinois High School Association (IHSA). The school sports teams are nicknamed the Admirals. Farragut boys' basketball team became Public League champions in 1994–95, regional champions seven times (1935–36, 2003–04, 2010–11, 2015–16, 2016–17, 2017–18 and 2018–19) and Class AA four times (1994–95, 1995–96, 2001–02 and 2003–04). Kevin Garnett and Ronnie Fields, both of whom went on to play in the National Basketball Association (NBA), were key players on the school's basketball team during their Public League championship win in 1995.

== Notable alumni ==
- Otis Armstrong (1968) — former NFL running back.
- Tony Brown (1978) — former NBA basketball player and current assistant coach for Washington Wizards.
- Lorenzo Clemons (1964) — actor.
- Bruce DeMars (1953) — retired U.S. Navy 4-star admiral; Director, Naval Nuclear Propulsion, (1988-1996).
- Arnold T. Dorenfeld (1953) — American photographer.
- Michael Dunigan (2008) — basketball player (Oregon Ducks).
- Ron Dunlap (1964) — basketball player for the University of Illinois, 19th pick of 1968 NBA draft.
- Ervin Frank "Four Sack" Dusak (attended) — MLB player for the St. Louis Cardinals.
- Willie Farley (1994) — basketball player.
- Ronnie Fields (1996) — basketball player.
- Kevin Garnett (1995) — basketball player, (Minnesota Timberwolves, Boston Celtics, and Brooklyn Nets), 2004 MVP, 2008 DPOY/champion, 2020 NBA Hall of Fame Inductee.
- Mack Herron (attended) — former NFL and CFL running back.
- Kim Novak (1950) — Golden Globe Award-winning film actress.
- Sonny Parker (1972) — former NBA basketball player (Golden State Warriors).
- Pat Sajak (1964) — game show host, Wheel of Fortune.
- Sandra Seaton (1959) — award-winning playwright and librettist.
- Ernie Terrell (1957) — former heavyweight champion boxer and promoter.
- Isiah Williams (2008) — basketball player.
- Michael Wright (1998) — American–Turkish basketball player.
