= Elizabeth F. Kinlaw =

American Basketweaver

- Born: 1951; Mount Pleasant
- Occupation: Basket weaver

Elizabeth F. Kinlaw (born 1951) is an American basket weaver from South Carolina whose work has been displayed at the Smithsonian Institution, the Princeton University Art Museum, the Samuel P. Harn Museum of Art, and Francis Marion University.

Kinlaw was born in 1951 in Mount Pleasant, South Carolina. She learned Gullah basketweaving as a young child from her mother, grandmother, and aunt. Kinlaw typically weaves her baskets out of sweetgrass. One of Kinlaw's baskets were acquired by the South Carolina Arts Commission in 1993. In 2012, another one of Kinlaw's baskets was acquired by the Samuel P. Harn Museum of Art. In 2015, Kinlaw was featured in the exhibition "The African-American Voice - South Carolina Arts Commission State Art Collection" in the Hyman Fine Arts Center at Francis Marion University. In May 2022, Kinlaw's work was acquired by the Smithsonian American Art Museum for their exhibit "This Present Moment: Crafting a Better World".
