= Madison Township, Dubois County, Indiana =

Madison Township
- Township
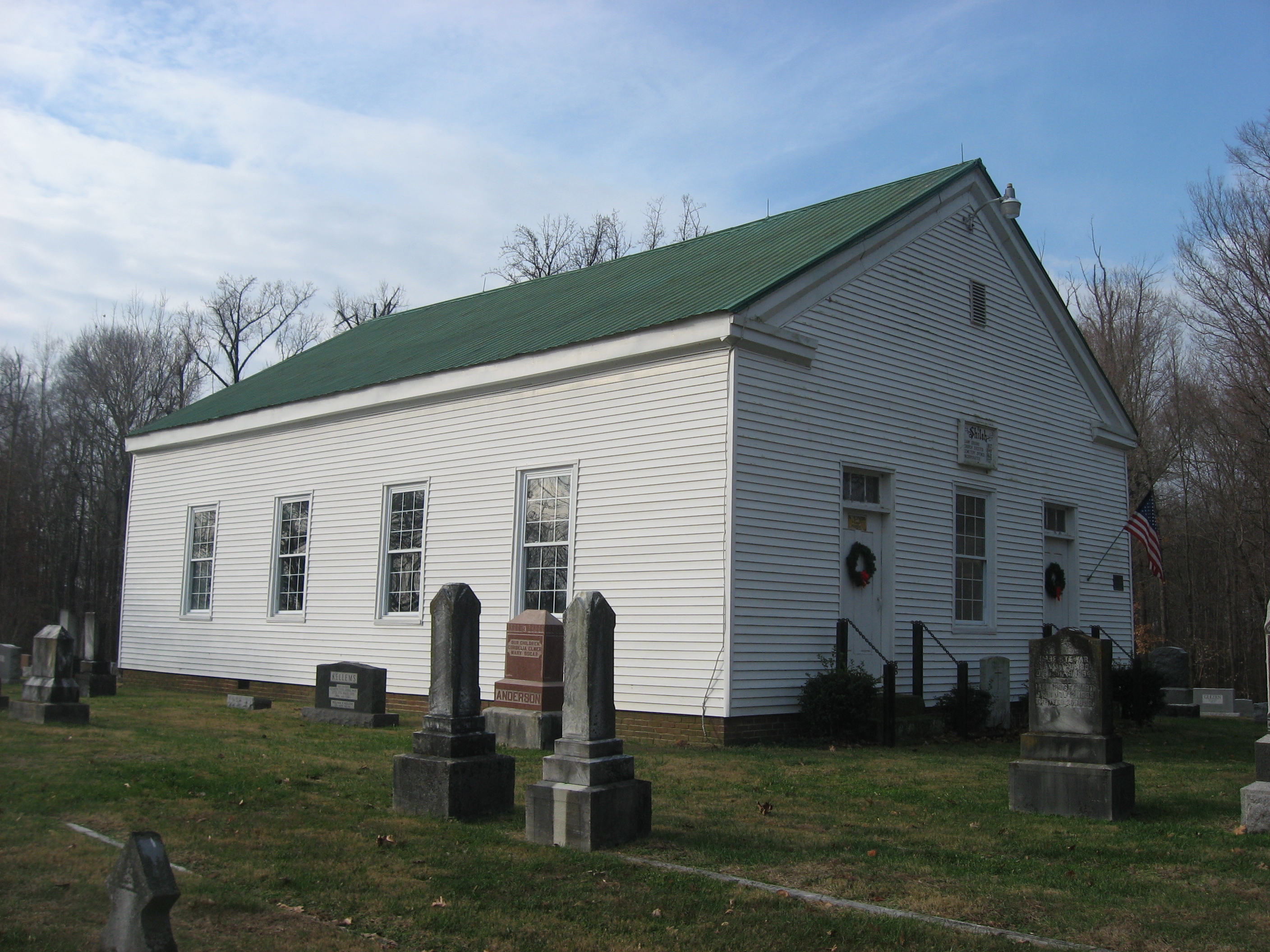
- Shiloh Presbyterian Church, a historic site in the township

- Location of Madison Township in Dubois County
- Coordinates: 38°22′57″N 87°01′47″W
- Country: United States
- State: Indiana
- County: Dubois

Government
  - Type: Indiana township

Area
  - Total: 35.59 sq mi (92.2 km^{2})
  - Land: 34.97 sq mi (90.6 km^{2})
  - Water: 0.62 sq mi (1.6 km^{2})
- Elevation: 436 ft (133 m)

Population (2020)
  - Total: 2,889
  - Density: 77.1/sq mi (29.8/km^{2})
- FIPS code: 18-45954
- GNIS feature ID: 453591

Madison Township is one of twelve townships in Dubois County, Indiana. As of the 2010 census, its population was 2,696 and it contained 935 housing units.

== History ==
The Shiloh Presbyterian Church was listed on the National Register of Historic Places in 1982.

== Geography ==
According to the 2010 census, the township has a total area of 35.59 square miles (92.2 km^{2}), of which 34.97 square miles (90.6 km^{2}) (or 98.26%) is land and 0.62 square miles (1.6 km^{2}) (or 1.74%) is water.

=== Unincorporated towns ===
- Ireland
- Millersport

(This list is based on USGS data and may include former settlements.)

=== Adjacent townships ===
- Boone Township (north)
- Bainbridge Township (east)
- Patoka Township (southeast)
- Lockhart Township, Pike County (southwest)
- Marion Township, Pike County (west)
- Jefferson Township, Pike County (northwest)

=== Major highways ===
- Indiana State Road 56

=== Cemeteries ===
The township contains six cemeteries: Alexander, Armstrong, Dillin, Hobbs, Mount Zion and Payne.

== Education ==
Madison Township is in Greater Jasper Consolidated Schools.

Previously Ireland had its own high school, known as Madison Township High School. The school colors were green and white, and the mascot was the "spuds" (meaning potatoes). A new building was being built circa 1948. In 1970 the school merged into Jasper High School.
