= Shiloh Meeting House and Cemetery =

Historic site in Dubois County, Indiana, US

- U.S. National Register of Historic Places
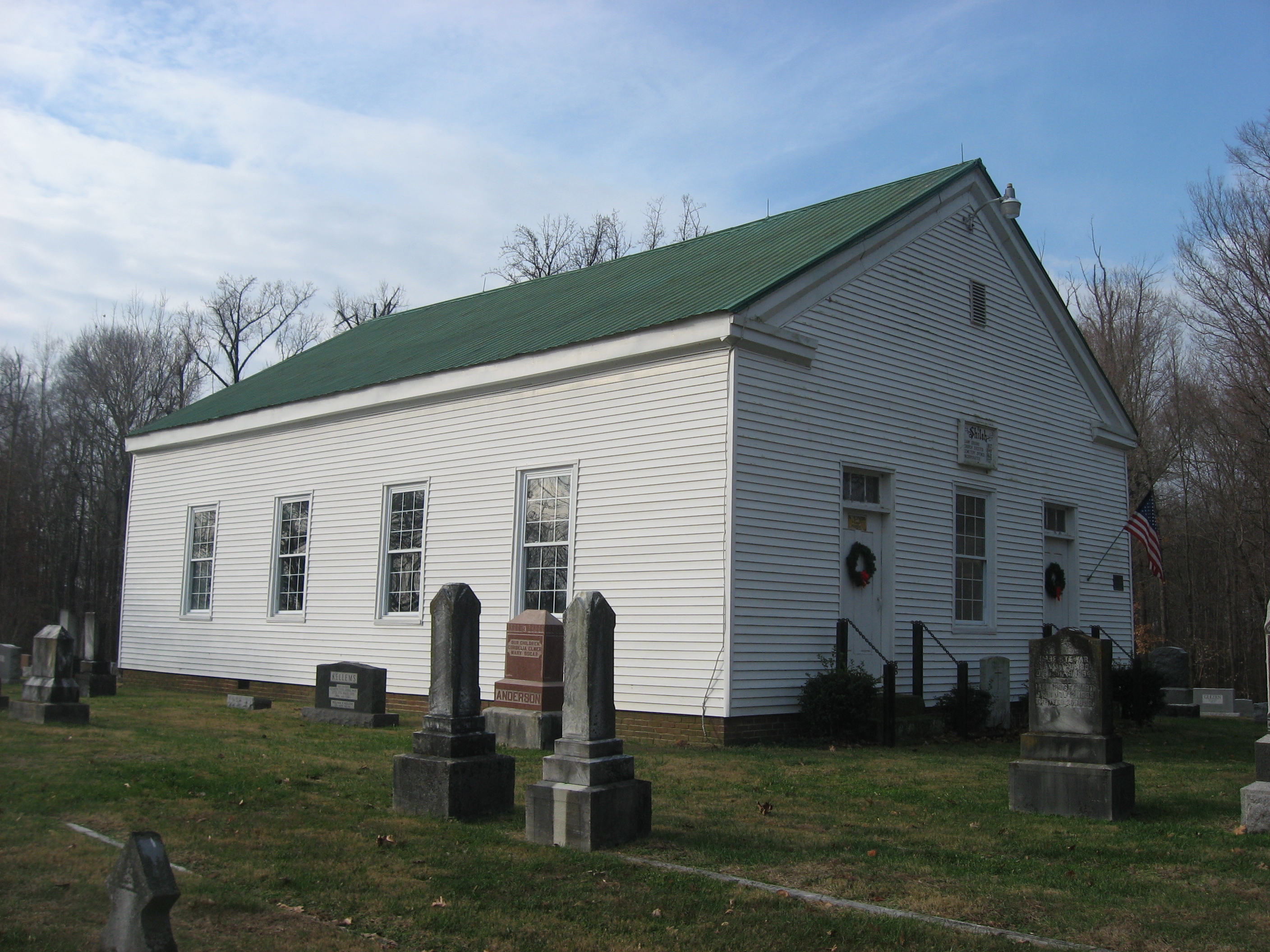
- Shiloh Meeting House, December 2011

- Location within Indiana Location within the United States
- Location: Southeast of Ireland on 150 North Rd., Madison Township, Dubois County, Indiana
- Coordinates: 38°23′53″N 86°58′57″W
- Area: 6.3 acres (2.5 ha)
- Built: 1849
- Architectural style: Greek Revival
- NRHP reference No.: 82000035
- Added to NRHP: July 29, 1982

The Shiloh Meeting House and Cemetery is a historic Presbyterian meeting house and cemetery located near Ireland in Madison Township, Dubois County, Indiana. It was built in 1849, and is a simple one-story, rectangular frame building with Greek Revival style design elements. It has a gable front roof and rests on a sandstone pier foundation. Also on the property is a contributing cemetery.

It was added to the National Register of Historic Places in 1982.

== Gallery ==
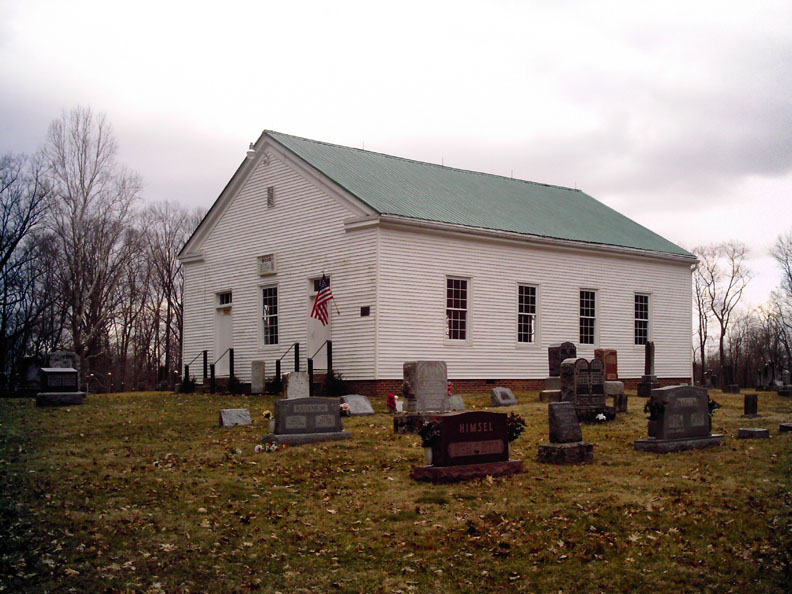
The church in 2007

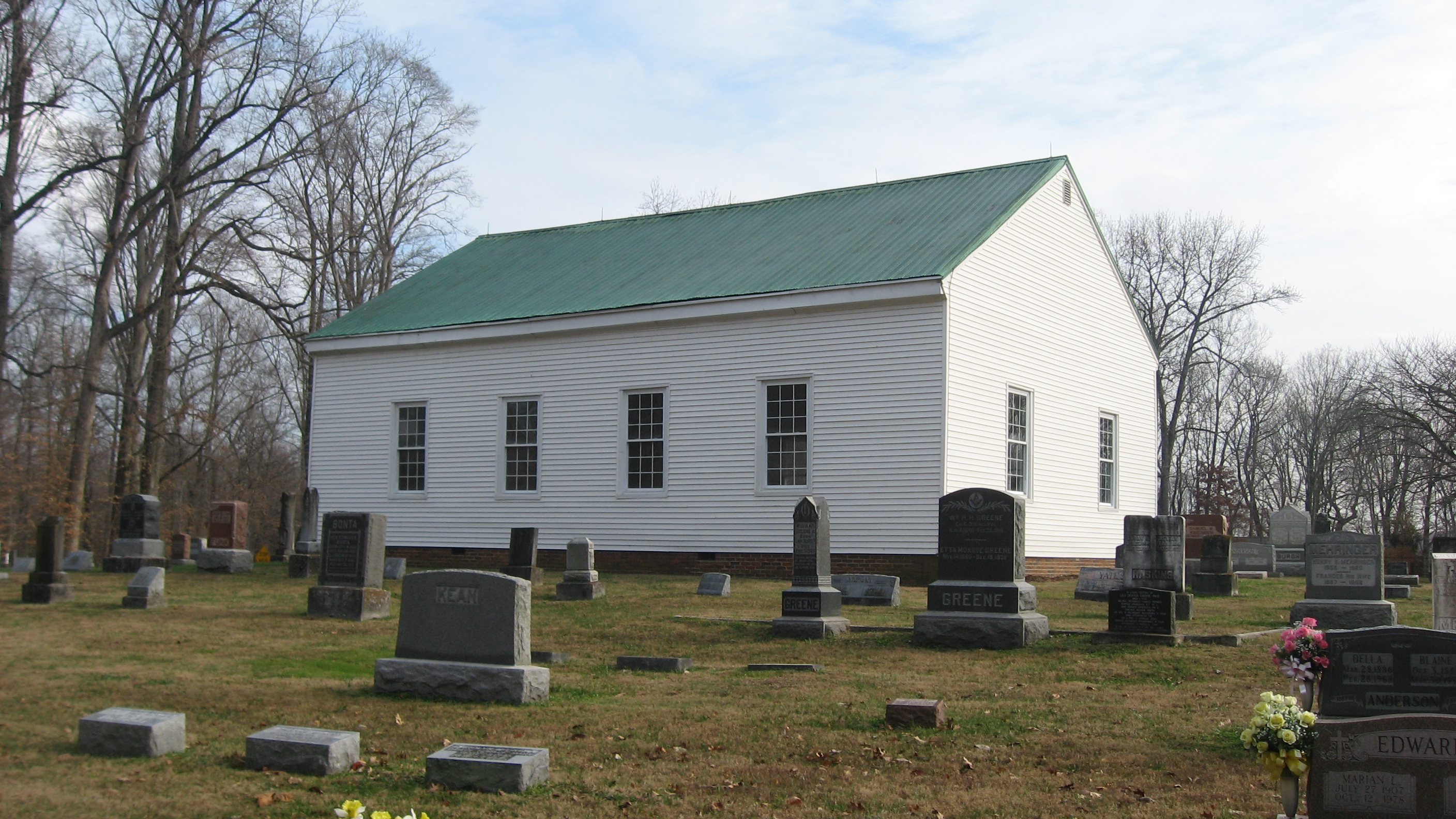
Rear view of the church

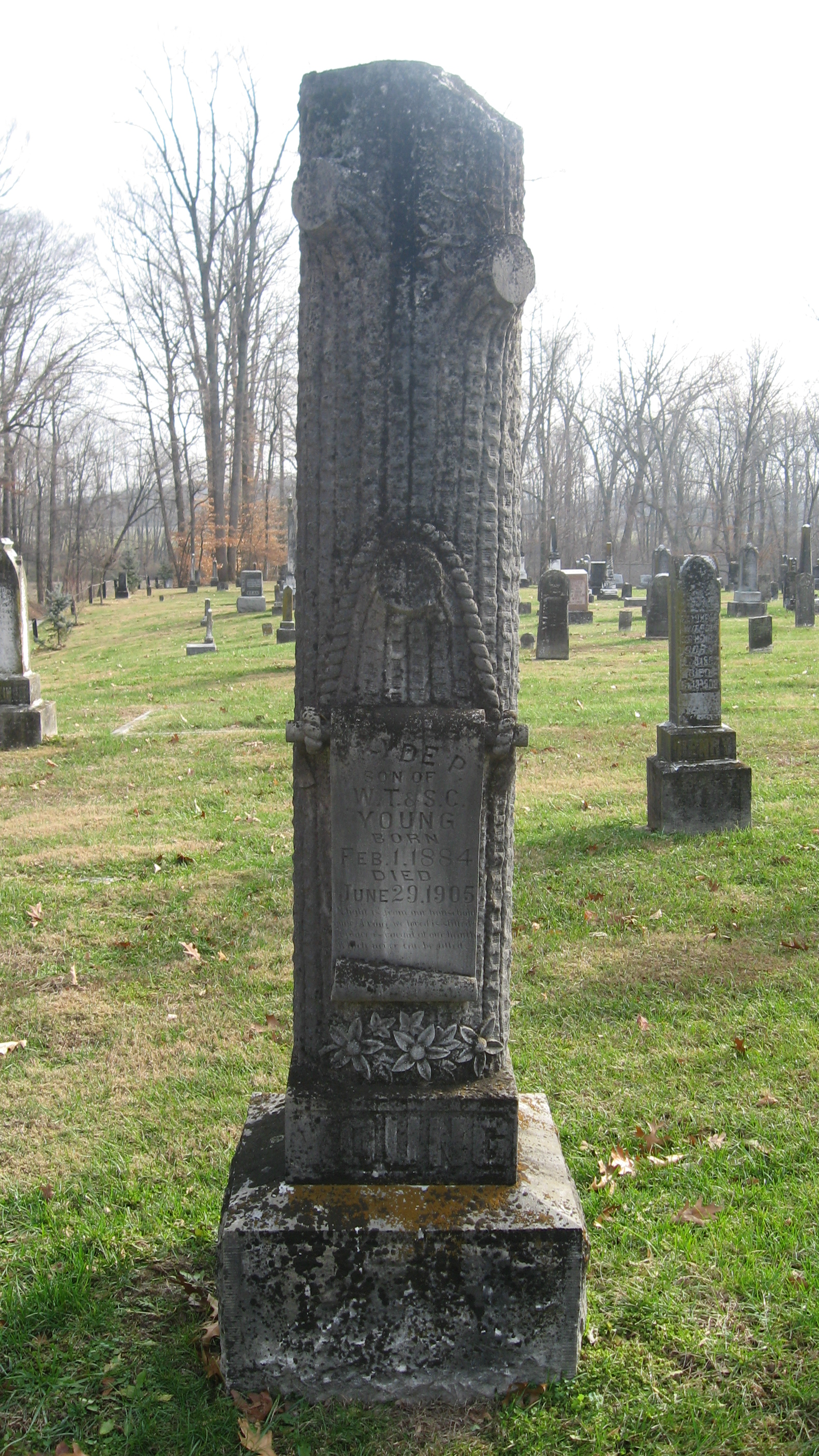
A tree-shaped gravestone
