= Millersport (disambiguation) =

Millersport may refer to:

- Millersport, Indiana, an unincorporated community in Dubois County
- Millersport, New York, a hamlet in the town of Clarence in Erie County
- Millersport, Ohio, a village in Fairfield County
- Millersport, Lawrence County, Ohio
