= Doren (name) =

Doren may refer to the following people

Given name

- Doren Robbins (born 1949), American poet

Surname

- Arnold Doren (1935–2003), American photographer
- Charles Doren, American bishop
- Electra Collins Doren (1861–1927), American suffragette and library scientist
- Van Doren (disambiguation)
