= Allen Rosenberg (rowing) =

American rower and rowing coach

- Rosenberg at the 1961 Maccabiah Games

Personal information
- Born: November 29, 1931 Philadelphia, Pennsylvania, U.S.
- Died: December 7, 2013 (aged 82) Silver Spring, Maryland, U.S.

Sport
- Sport: Rowing
Medal record
Representing the United States
Pan American Games
Gold medal – first place	1955 Mexico City	Eight
Silver medal – second place	1955 Mexico City	Coxed four
European Rowing Championships
Silver medal – second place	1958 Poznań	Eight

Allen Perry Rosenberg (November 29, 1931 – December 7, 2013) was an American rowing coxswain and coach. As a coxswain he won a gold and a silver medal at the 1955 Pan American Games and a silver at the 1958 European Championships. As a coach he was responsible for more than 24 gold and silver medals at the Olympics and world championships.

== Early life ==
Rosenberg was Jewish. He was born in Philadelphia, Pennsylvania, and grew up in the Strawberry Mansion section of Philadelphia until his family moved to Bucks County, Pennsylvania. He had an identical twin brother, Arnold T. Rosenberg. He graduated from Central High School in Philadelphia, where he ran the quarter mile and wrestled.

Rosenberg first attended Pennsylvania State University, where he wrestled, and then Temple University and Temple University School of Law, from which he graduated with degrees in pharmacy and law. He was a patent attorney.

== Rowing career ==
Rosenberg competed in from the mid-1950s through the early 1960s, and won four U.S. and three Canadian national rowing titles: in 1954, he won the U.S. coxed fours and Canada eights; in 1955, he won the U.S. eights; and in 1957 and 1958, he won both the U.S. and Canadian eights.

Internationally he won a silver medal in the eights at the 1958 European Rowing Championships, a gold medal and a silver medal at the 1955 Pan American Games, and a gold medal at the 1961 Maccabiah Games.

== Coaching career ==
Rosenberg began coaching while he was still competing. He coached the Vesper Boat Club in Philadelphia, and became the rowing coach at St. Francis College.

He was head coach of a number of United States National Rowing teams from 1961 to 1976. He coached the 1964 U.S. Olympic 8 pared shell to a gold medal victory, and also won two gold medals (in Eights and Pairs with Coxswain), a silver medal (in Double Sculls), and a bronze medal (in Four Without Cox). He coached the 1974 World Championships team that won a gold medal in Eights.

He also coached teams that won a silver medal at the 1965 World Championships and a gold medal at the 1974 World Championships, as well as a silver medal at the 1976 Olympics. His teams won two golds, a silver, and a bronze at the 1975 Pan American Games. He coached U.S. teams at the 1961 Maccabiah Games and 1965 Maccabiah Games, that each won three gold medals.

Rosenberg coached into the early 2000s with crews that consistently placed in the top tier Nationally and Internationally.

His rowing techniques became internationally known as the "Rosenberg Style", and employed by the majority of world-class rowing crews. He was named the first U.S. National Technical Director of American Rowing. He also was president of the Rowing Coaches of America.

== Halls of Fame ==
Rosenberg was inducted into the Rowing Hall of Fame in 1984. He was inducted into the International Jewish Sports Hall of Fame in 1994, the Philadelphia Jewish Sports Hall of Fame in 1997, and the Greater Washington, D.C. Jewish Sports Hall of Fame.

== Death ==
Rosenberg died at Silver Spring, Maryland, on December 7, 2013. He had suffered from Lewy body dementias in his later years.
