= Arnold Habig =

American businessman

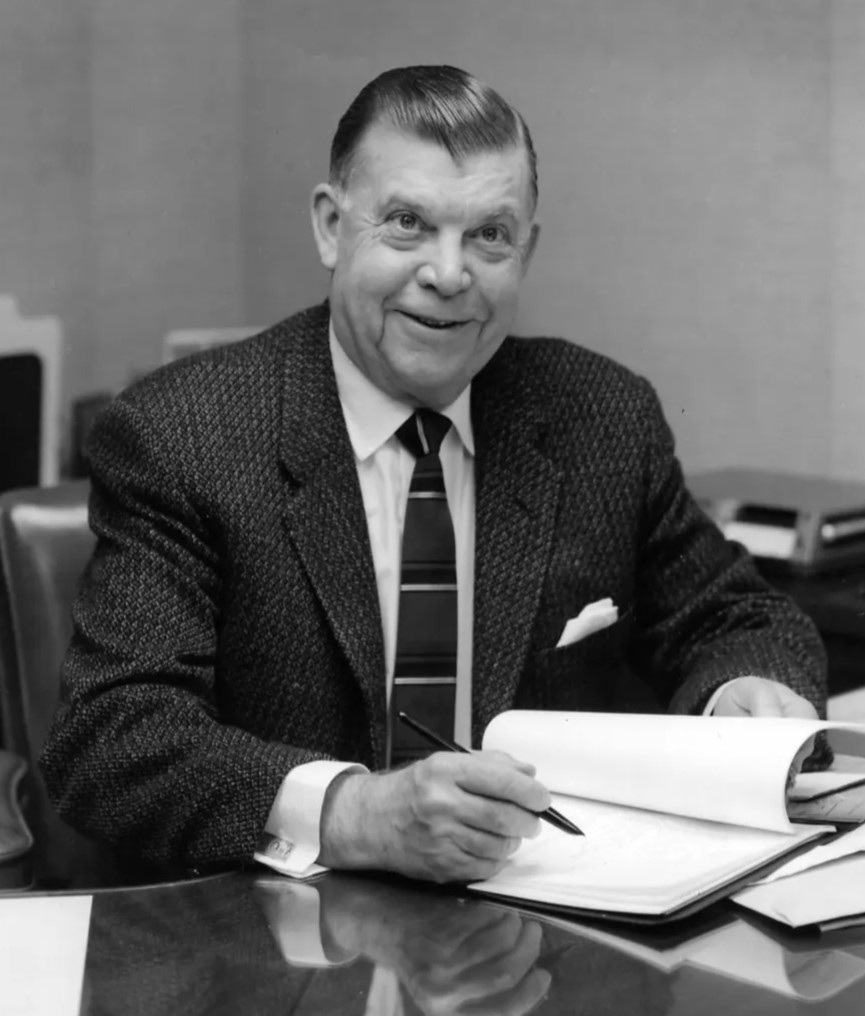
- Born: Arnold Francis Habig; May 2, 1907; Jasper, Indiana, U.S.
- Died: March 29, 1999 (aged 91); Jasper, Indiana, U.S.
- Education: Spencerian College
- Known for: Founding Kimball International

Arnold Francis Habig (May 2, 1907 – March 29, 1999) was an American businessman best known as the founder of Kimball International. Habig founded The Jasper Corporation, initially a small woodworking firm, in 1950. The company purchased W. W. Kimball Company in 1959 and changed its name to Kimball International in 1974. By the time of Habig's death, Kimball was a billion-dollar company. Kimball remains headquartered in his Jasper, Indiana hometown.

== Early life and education ==
Arnold Francis Habig was born May 2, 1907, in Jasper, Indiana. He graduated from Jasper High School in 1925 and from Spencerian College in Louisville, Kentucky in 1926. After briefly working in Louisville, Habig returned to Jasper in 1927 and worked for Jasper Machine Works and Jasper Wood Products Company.

== Business career ==
Habig spent 20 years with Jasper Wood Products Company. He started as a janitor and became a plant manager and member of the board of directors. In 1950, he founded The Jasper Corporation. Starting with two dozen employees and one plant, the company emerged into a leading maker of wood cabinets for television sets. Among his unique strategies for the time, he eliminated punch clocks for his employees, instead instilling a culture of trust. In 1958, Habig acquired West Baden National Bank of West Baden Springs, Indiana and French Lick State Bank of French Lick, Indiana to form Springs Valley Bank & Trust Company.

In 1959, Jasper purchased the W. W. Kimball Company out of Chicago. Founded in 1857, W. W. Kimball Company, once the world's largest piano manufacturer, was nearly insolvent at the time. By 1969, Kimball, as a subsidiary of Jasper, was again the world's largest piano manufacturer. During this time Jasper purchased other piano manufacturers including Bösendorfer of Vienna, Austria.

Habig was named in the 1968 U.S. Supreme Court case United States v. Habig, 390 U.S. 222 (1968). In the tax fraud-related case, the Supreme Court held that Habig could not be prosecuted under the statute of limitations.

In 1974, The Jasper Corporation changed its name to Kimball International, Inc. In addition to its piano business, Kimball manufactured office and hospitality furniture and electronics. In 1976, Kimball went public on the Nasdaq. As part of the 1984 Summer Olympics opening ceremony in Los Angeles, 84 Kimball pianos were played. Habig stepped down as chairman of Kimball in 1990.

As head of Kimball, Habig operated a profit-sharing system for company employees and a scholarship program to fund nearly $2 million of his employees' children's college educations. He donated his home to the City of Jasper upon his death on March 29, 1999, and it subsequently became the Arnold F. Habig Community Center.

== Personal life ==
Habig married his high school sweetheart Mary Ann Jahn in 1927. They were married for 44 years before her death and had three sons and three daughters.

Habig's sons all held senior positions at Kimball International; Thomas served as chairman, Douglas as president and CEO, and John as senior executive vice president. According to the Indiana Historical Society, Habig is quoted as having said, "That is one of the unwritten laws of the Habig family. The sons are in the business, the daughters will receive the dividends and the son-in-laws, if they so desire, will be put in to a business, but not the company." He acknowledged that he practiced nepotism in his company.

In 1972, Habig married Barbara Southard.
