= Ireland, Indiana =

- Unincorporated community and Census Designated Place
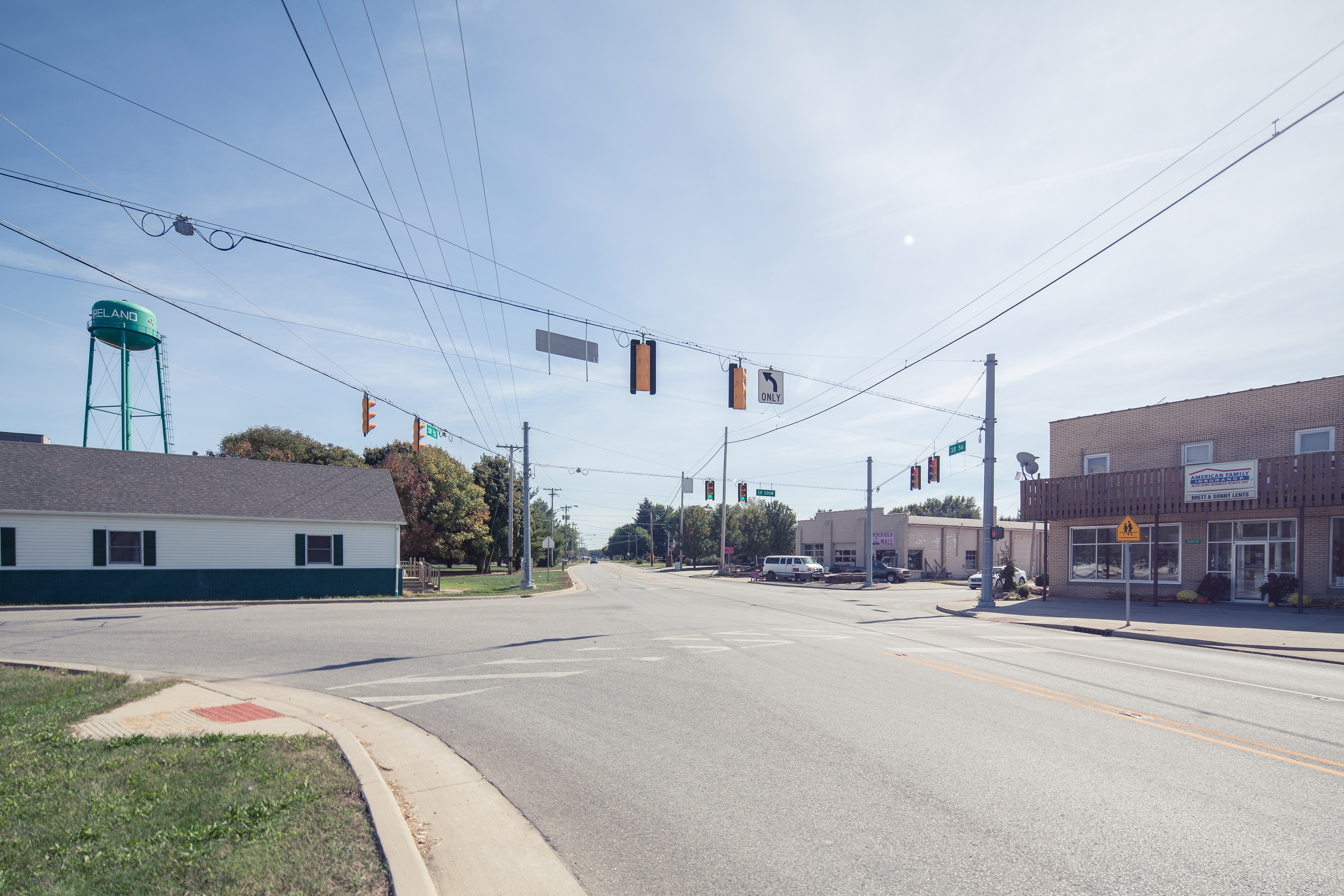
- Downtown Ireland

- Location within Indiana Location within the United States
- Coordinates: 38°24′53″N 86°59′57″W
- Country: United States
- State: Indiana
- County: Dubois
- Township: Madison
- Elevation: 479 ft (146 m)
- Time zone: UTC-5 (Eastern (EST))
  - Summer (DST): UTC-4 (EDT)
- ZIP code: 47545
- Area codes: 812, 930
- FIPS code: 18-36468
- GNIS feature ID: 2830364

Ireland is an unincorporated community in Madison Township, Dubois County, in the U.S. state of Indiana.

== History ==
The town was founded on land purchased from the United States government by John Stewart, a native of Ireland, on December 23, 1816. The earliest settlers, most being Protestant, came from Virginia, Pennsylvania, and North Carolina. These early settlers lived in the Irish Settlement, the area that is now the northern Madison Township.

The town was once intended to be called American City, but changed to Ireland when the name was not approved by the post office department. The town was laid out by John Stewart's son James, and four others. The first town map is dated May 20, 1865, but had been a small village many years before that.

The Ireland post office has been in operation since 1853. Ireland's school system was absorbed by Greater Jasper Consolidated Schools in 1970, with the middle school being torn down in 1989. The current Ireland Elementary School was built in 1990 on the site of the old middle school.

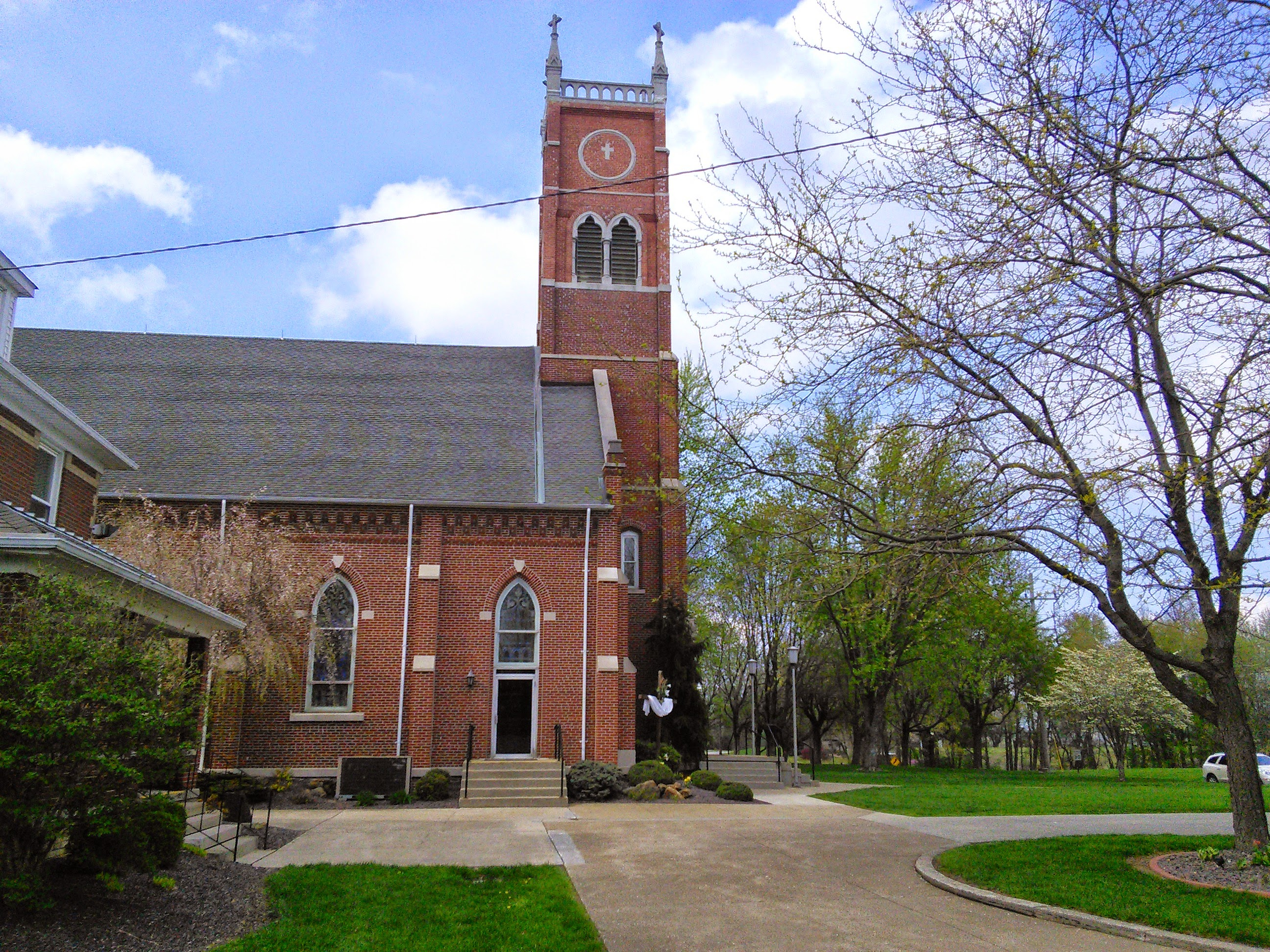
St. Mary's Church

On the night of February 28, 2017, an EF2 tornado associated with the February 28, 2017, tornado outbreak struck Ireland. Several homes were destroyed, however no injuries were reported.

== Religion ==
Ireland is home of St. Mary's Church, a Roman Catholic church.

== Geography ==
Ireland is located 4 miles west of downtown Jasper on State Road 56 in the northeast portion of Madison Township. On the western edge of the town lies the Alder Creek, a tributary of the Patoka River. Besides the valley caused by the Alder Creek, the area around Ireland is a mostly flat plain that can stretch for miles at certain points.

== Demographics ==
The United States Census Bureau delineated Ireland as a census designated place in the 2022 American Community Survey.

== Education ==
Madison Township is in Greater Jasper Consolidated Schools.

Previously Ireland had its own high school, known as Madison Township High School. The school colors were green and white, and the mascot was the "spuds" (meaning potatoes). A new building was being built circa 1948. In 1970 the school merged into Jasper High School.
