= Krakauer Brothers =

American piano manufacturer (1869–1985)

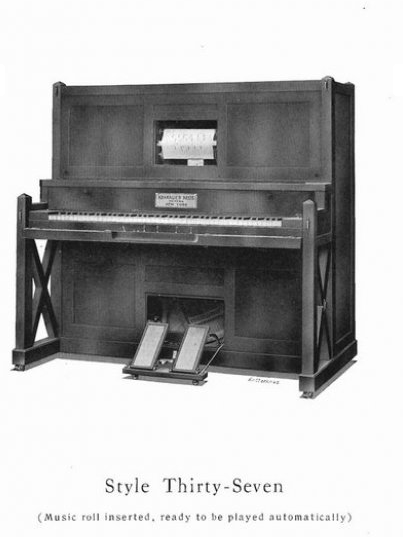
Piano "Style Thirty-Seven" with automatic music roll

Krakauer Brothers was an American manufacturer of handmade, high-quality pianos, founded 1869 in New York City by the Jewish immigrant Simon Krakauer, his son David and his brother Julius.

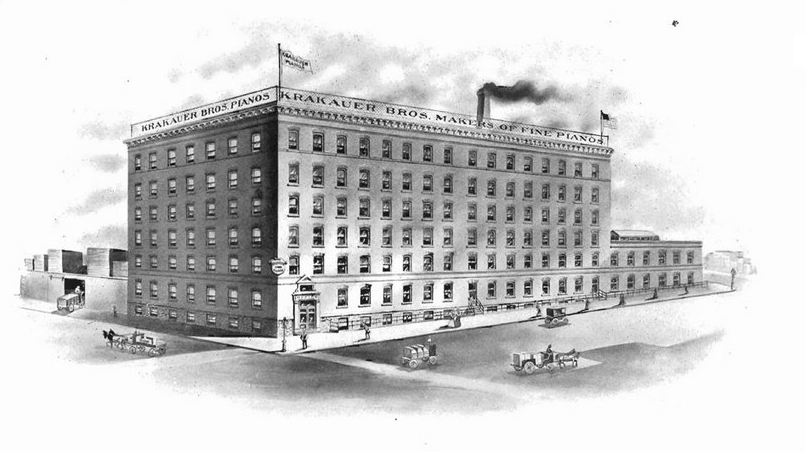
Krakauer Bros. factory in New York

The company's growth led to the opening of a factory on Cypress Avenue and 136th to 137th Street in the Bronx, New York City. Krakauer was a prominent piano company, known for making pianos of high quality and for its influential inventions within the area of piano development in the late 19th and early 20th Centuries.

In 1917 Krakauer incorporated the Madison Piano Company, building Madison brand of pianos for several decades. Krakauer Brothers was one of the few American piano companies to survive the Great Depression without being absorbed into a larger conglomerate.

In 1977 Howard K. Graves purchased the company and moved it to Berlin, Ohio. Krakauer produced brands such as Vertichord, Lyrichord and Madison. Krakauer became a division of Kimball International in 1980, the starting serial number was 86405. The Berlin factory closed in 1985, with it the name Krakauer came to an end.
