= Claramae Turner =

American opera singer (1920–2013)

- Born: Claramae Haas; October 28, 1920; Dinuba, California, U.S.
- Died: May 18, 2013 (aged 92); Santa Rosa, California, U.S.
- Burial place: Ocean View Cemetery, Eureka, California, U.S.
- Occupation(s): Actress, opera singer
- Years active: 1942–1974
- Spouse(s): Robert Turner; Frank Hoffmann
- Children: 3

Claramae Turner (née Haas; October 28, 1920 – May 18, 2013) was an American operatic contralto, perhaps best known for her appearance in the film Carousel (1956), adapted from the Rodgers and Hammerstein stage musical of the same name.

== Early life ==
Born in the great Central Valley, outside Dinuba, California, she began her career at the Bush Street Music Hall in San Francisco, where she sang the contralto leads in Gilbert and Sullivan operettas; at the same time she joined the chorus of San Francisco Opera.

== Career ==
She made her San Francisco Opera principal debut as The Voice in The Tales of Hoffmann in 1945, and sang with the Metropolitan Opera from 1946 to 1950, appearing in Faust (as Marthe, opposite Raoul Jobin), Boris Godunov (as the Hôtesse, with Ezio Pinza), Aida (as Amneris), Hansel and Gretel (as Gertrud), Roméo et Juliette (as Gertrude, with Jussi Björling and Bidu Sayão), The Marriage of Figaro (as Marcellina), Siegfried (as Erda, with Lauritz Melchior and Astrid Varnay), Cavalleria rusticana (as Lucia), The Barber of Seville (as Berta, opposite Giuseppe Valdengo and Lily Pons), Peter Grimes (as Auntie), and Gianni Schicchi (as Zita).

Turner then sang with the New York City Opera from 1953 to 1969, in The Medium, Hansel and Gretel (now as The Witch), Œdipus rex (as Jocasta, with Richard Cassilly, conducted by Leopold Stokowski), Suor Angelica (as the Zia Principessa, conducted by Julius Rudel), Carmen, Louise (as the Mère), The Ballad of Baby Doe (as Augusta, with Beverly Sills), Dialogues of the Carmelites (as Madame de Croissy), Bomarzo (as Diana Orsini, opposite Salvador Novoa, directed by Tito Capobianco), Iolanthe (as the Queen of the Fairies), Lady Jane in Patience and The Mikado (as Katisha), among others.

She created the role of Madame Flora in Gian Carlo Menotti's The Medium, in 1946 at its first performances at Columbia University. She reprised the role in an episode of Omnibus on television, conducted by Werner Torkanowsky (1959). She also recorded the role of Ma Moss in Aaron Copland's The Tender Land (opposite Joy Clements and Norman Treigle, conducted by the composer, 1965), Bomarzo (1967), and Gertrud in an English version of Engelbert Humperdinck's Hansel and Gretel, starring Risë Stevens and Nadine Conner (1947). This performance was one of the first Metropolitan Opera record albums of a complete opera ever released (by Columbia Masterworks Records). Miss Turner reprised the role on television in a performance on NBC Opera Theatre.

For radio, she sang the role of Ulrica in Arturo Toscanini's 1954 concert version of Verdi's Un ballo in maschera, co-starring Herva Nelli, Jan Peerce, and Robert Merrill, in the conductor's final complete operatic performance. This performance was later released on LP and CD by RCA Victor.

In 1956, Turner appeared in her only film, Rodgers and Hammerstein's Carousel (with Shirley Jones), based on the successful stage musical. In the film, she played the role of Nettie Fowler.

She sang the role of Nettie again in a Command Records studio cast recording of Carousel, starring Alfred Drake and Roberta Peters, recorded in 1962.

The song "I Left My Heart in San Francisco" was written for Turner, and it was she, not Tony Bennett, who originally sang it. However, it was Bennett who first recorded it.

In 1965 Turner sang the role of Ma Moss in an abridged recording of Aaron Copland's opera The Tender Land with the New York Philharmonic conducted by the composer (Columbia records MS6814).

In 1970, Turner collaborated with Scott McKenzie, making a cameo appearance while McKenzie was performing at the Great American Music Hall. Together, they sang "San Francisco (Be Sure to Wear Flowers in Your Hair)" as a duet. Fans praised Turner's version of the song, prompting her to record her own version in 1971, making it her first and only pop tune.

Albums have been released of Turner in complete live recordings of Verdi's La forza del destino, starring Zinka Milanov, Mario Del Monaco, and Leonard Warren, in a New Orleans performance conducted by Walter Herbert, and the Verdi Requiem, conducted by Guido Cantelli.

== Death ==
Turner retired in the 1980s and moved to a rural area, where she lived for the rest of her life. She died of natural causes on May 18, 2013, at her home in Santa Rosa, California. She was 92 years old. Turner is buried in Eureka, California.
