= Carousel (film) =

1956 film by Henry King

- Theatrical release poster
- Directed by: Henry King
- Screenplay by: Phoebe Ephron; Henry Ephron
- Based on: Carousel; 1945 musical by Richard Rodgers; Oscar Hammerstein II Liliom; 1909 play by Ferenc Molnár
- Produced by: Henry Ephron
- Starring: Gordon MacRae; Shirley Jones; Cameron Mitchell; Barbara Ruick; Claramae Turner; Robert Rounseville; Gene Lockhart; Audrey Christie; Susan Luckey; William LeMassena; John Dehner; Jacques d'Amboise
- Cinematography: Charles G. Clarke
- Edited by: William H. Reynolds
- Music by: Richard Rodgers
- Distributed by: 20th Century-Fox
- Release date: February 16, 1956
- Running time: 128 minutes
- Country: United States
- Language: English
- Budget: $3.3 million
- Box office: $3.75 million (U.S. rentals)

Carousel is a 1956 American dramatic fantasy musical film based on the 1945 Rodgers and Hammerstein stage musical of the same name, which was based on Ferenc Molnár's 1909 non-musical play Liliom. The film stars Gordon MacRae and Shirley Jones and was directed by Henry King.

As with the original stage production, the film contains some of Rodgers and Hammerstein's most famous songs and perhaps the most serious storyline of all of their musicals.

== Plot ==
From heaven, Billy Bigelow inquires about returning to earth for one day and recounts the story of his life and death in flashbacks.

Billy, a rough-talking carousel barker, and Julie Jordan, a young, innocent mill worker, live in the small town of Boothbay Harbor, Maine. After Billy pays too much attention to Julie and incurs the wrath of jealous carousel owner Mrs. Mullin, he is fired. Julie violates the curfew imposed by wealthy mill owner Mr. Bascombe, who fires her while a police officer warns her about Billy.

Billy and Julie marry and live at the seaside spa and restaurant of her cousin Nettie Jordan. Julie admits that Billy, frustrated and bitter because he cannot find work, has started hitting her. Mrs. Mullin wishes to rehire Billy, but only if he leaves his wife. However, when Julie informs Billy that she is pregnant, Billy is overjoyed and declines Mrs. Mullin's offer. He tells Julie of his dream to take her to San Francisco.

Worried about finances and lacking work experience, Billy secretly agrees to join his pal Jigger Craigin in robbing Bascombe. During a clambake on a nearby island, Billy and Jigger sneak onto the mainland to commit the robbery, but Bascombe, who is usually unarmed, carries a gun and the robbery is foiled. While Bascombe is momentarily distracted, Jigger flees and leaves Billy at the mercy of the police. Cornered, Billy climbs atop a pile of crates, but they collapse and Billy falls on his own knife. The others return from the clambake, and Julie sees the mortally wounded Billy. She rushes to him and he dies after saying his last words to her. Julie is devastated because she truly loved Billy, even though she never had the courage to say so out loud.

Back in the afterlife, Billy is told that he can return to mortal life for one day to make amends. Billy returns to find his 15-year-old daughter Louise emotionally scarred by constant taunting because her father tried to commit a robbery. Without disclosing his identity to Louise, Billy makes himself visible, tries to raise her spirits and gives her a star that he stole from heaven. Louise is frightened and refuses the star, but Billy, in desperation, slaps her hand. She rushes inside the house and informs Julie, saying that she did not feel a slap, but a kiss. Billy tries to become invisible before Julie can see him, but she glimpses him for a brief moment and senses that he has returned for a reason.

Billy asks his heavenly guide for permission to attend Louise's high-school graduation, where he silently gives Louise confidence and assures Julie that he loved her. As he leaves the graduation ceremony, he is taken back to heaven.

== Cast ==
- Gordon MacRae as Billy Bigelow
- Shirley Jones as Julie Jordan
- Cameron Mitchell as Jigger Craigin
- Barbara Ruick as Carrie Pipperidge
- Claramae Turner as Cousin Nettie Jordan
- Gene Lockhart as the Starkeeper and Dr. Seldon
- Audrey Christie as Mrs. Mullin
- Robert Rounseville as Enoch Snow
- John Dehner as Mr. Bascombe
- Susan Luckey as Louise Bigelow
- Jacques d'Amboise as the Starlight Carnival barker
- William LeMassena as the Heavenly Friend
- Tor Johnson as Strong Man (uncredited)

== Production ==
The film was shot in CinemaScope 55 and DeLuxe Color. However, it was projected in regular 35mm CinemaScope rather than 55mm, although the original premiere featured a six-track magnetic stereo soundtrack specially devised for CinemaScope 55. It was played on a separate machine synchronized with the film. All of the other prints were composite prints and used the standard four-track stereo soundtrack featured on regular CinemaScope films of the era.

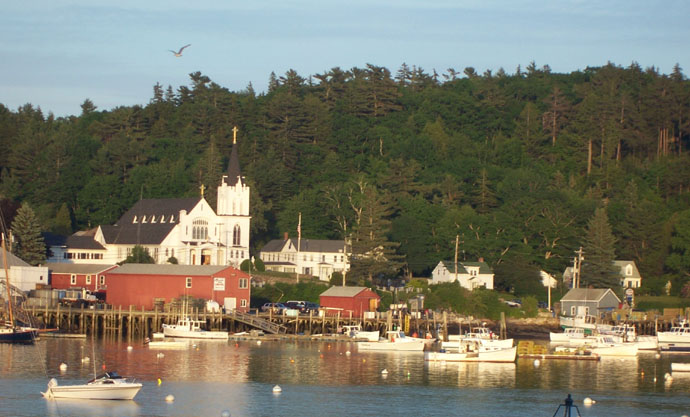
Boothbay Harbor, Maine, site of location filming

Cinematographer Charles G. Clarke explained: "In the beginning it was decided to film 'Carousel' in both 55mm and the standard 35mm CinemaScope. This meant double setups for each shot. When the results became available for screening, our studio decided the 35mm version was no longer required, and thereafter we filmed the production only in 55mm CinemaScope. ... The new 55mm CinemaScope negative is exactly four diameters greater in size [than 35mm]—twice the width and twice as high—so that reductions are made without altering the composition of the original negative." Clarke noted that the period of dual filming was limited to "the first few weeks".

Frank Sinatra was originally cast to play Billy Bigelow and recorded his songs for the film. It had been reported that Sinatra withdrew in objection to the requirement that each scene be filmed twice, one for regular CinemaScope and the other for CinemaScope 55, but according to Shirley Jones' 2014 autobiography, he quit because his wife Ava Gardner threatened infidelity if he failed to accompany her on the set of her film The Barefoot Contessa. Gordon MacRae, Sinatra's replacement, was reported to have prepared in advance for the role, suspecting that Sinatra might withdraw. MacRae did not cut his hair after he finished filming Oklahoma!, and in July he starred in a State Fair of Texas production of Carousel. Director Henry King later recalled, "[A]lthough Gordon MacRae has an excellent singing voice, it was not a good picture for him. Maybe he was too good for it. Sinatra would have made a different thing out of it entirely ... [MacRae] just didn't have a style of his own, it's not individual. I think that's why Gordon never got up to a point where Sinatra did. But you never can tell what kept people from reaching the top."

Filming took place in the Maine locations of Boothbay Harbor, Camden, Newcastle and Augusta as well as Paradise Cove in Malibu, California and the Twentieth Century-Fox studios.

The film follows the stage musical faithfully except for five major changes:

- In the film, Billy dies accidentally, but in the original stage production, he commits suicide.
- The recitative singing in the bench scene leading directly into the song "If I Loved You" is instead spoken dialogue in the film.
- The recitative singing that leads directly into the song "June Is Bustin' Out All Over" was eliminated.
- In the stage production, Billy must perform a good deed on earth in order to earn entry to heaven, but in the film, it is apparent that Billy is already in heaven.
- The song "When the Children Are Asleep" was moved to a later moment in the film in order to take full advantage of the Maine locale.

== Reception ==
In a contemporary review for The New York Times, critic Bosley Crowther wrote:

"Carousel," like "Oklahoma!" before it, is a beautifully turned out film, crisply played and richly sung by a fine cast that is fully worthy of the original musical show. And Twentieth Century-Fox, its producers—not to be outdone by the producers of "Oklahoma!," who made that one in the new large-screen Todd-AO—have run out their latest large-screen process, CinemaScope 55, which gives more clarity, if not more size, to the image, for this production of "Carousel." The honor does something more than flatter the eminence of the enterprise. It endows the production with a sharpness of line and color that is well nigh superb. Seldom has a musical comedy been made to look more handsome on the screen. And that, as they say, is something that couldn't happen to a nicer show. ... [T]he picture follows the stage play most faithfully in plot and in mood. Its pathos derives from human nature; its poignance is wholly genuine. ... You may look for two hours of fine enjoyment in this beautiful, touching "Carousel."

Sources differ as to the film's financial success. Musical-theater scholar Thomas Hischak stated that the film "was a box office success across the country and 20th Century-Fox earned a considerable profit on the picture". However, Allmovie states: "The film's often downbeat tone ... did not resonate with 1950s audiences, making Carousel a surprising box-office flop. Some reviewers were also critical of the acceptance of wife-beating in the film."

== Soundtrack ==
Two songs recorded for the film, "You're a Queer One, Julie Jordan" and "Blow High, Blow Low," were removed to limit the film's duration but have been included in all editions of the soundtrack album. "The Highest Judge of All" was eliminated from the film and does not appear on the album, presumably because the flashback scenes precluded it. Mr. Snow's sentimental song "Geraniums in the Winder", which serves as an introduction to "Stonecutters Cut It on Stone", was also eliminated, as was a reprise of "Mister Snow". As with "The Highest Judge", neither "Geraniums in the Winder" nor the reprise of "Mister Snow" was recorded for the film and neither has appeared on any editions of the film's soundtrack. One verse of "Stonecutters Cut It on Stone" (which appears on the album) was omitted from the film, perhaps because of objectionable content.

The soundtrack album also features the complete version of "Carousel Waltz", which only is only heard in abridged format in the film. The album version of the song "When the Children Are Asleep" includes an introductory section sung by Mr. Snow that is not included in the film. The album also includes a section of "If I Loved You" that is not in the film.

The album was first issued on vinyl LP in 1956 by Capitol Records in mono and in stereo in 1958. The later release was shortened by abridging the opening instrumental "Carousel Waltz" because of technical limitations of stereo. Three editions of the soundtrack album have been issued on compact disc.

Under the vocal direction of Ken Darby, the songs on the expanded edition of the album are:

1. "Introduction" – Gordon MacRae/William Le Massena
2. "Main Title: The Carousel Waltz" – Twentieth Century-Fox Orchestra/Alfred Newman
3. "You're a Queer One, Julie Jordan" – Barbara Ruick/Shirley Jones
4. "When I Marry Mr. Snow" – Barbara Ruick
5. "If I Loved You" – Shirley Jones/Gordon MacRae
6. "June Is Bustin' Out All Over" – Claramae Turner/Barbara Ruick and Chorus
7. "June Is Bustin' Out All Over Ballet" – Twentieth Century-Fox Orchestra/Newman
8. "Soliloquy" – Gordon MacRae
9. "Blow High, Blow Low" – Cameron Mitchell and Men's Chorus
10. "When the Children Are Asleep" – Robert Rounseville/Barbara Ruick
11. "A Real Nice Clambake" – Barbara Ruick/Claramae Turner/Robert Rounseville/Cameron Mitchell and Chorus
12. "Stonecutters Cut It on Stone" – Cameron Mitchell and Chorus
13. "What's the Use of Wond'rin'" – Shirley Jones and Women's Chorus
14. "You'll Never Walk Alone" – Shirley Jones/Claramae Turner
15. "Ballet" – Orchestra/Newman
16. "If I Loved You (Reprise)" – Gordon MacRae
17. "You'll Never Walk Alone (Finale)" – Shirley Jones and Chorus
18. "Carousel Waltz (LP Version)" – Orchestra/Newman

== Awards ==
Carousel was nominated for Best Written American Musical by the Writers Guild of America and Outstanding Directorial Achievement in Motion Pictures by the Directors Guild of America. Gordon MacRae won a 1956 Laurel Award for Top Male Musical Performance.

The film was ranked #41 on Channel 4's list of the 100 greatest musicals.

Carousel was the only one of the seven Rodgers and Hammerstein theatrical films that was not nominated for any Academy Awards.

== Legacy ==
Carousel was remade as an ABC television film starring Robert Goulet, Mary Grover and Pernell Roberts that aired on May 7, 1967.

A film version of Carousel had been in preproduction for several years and was to be produced by Hugh Jackman, who would also star as Billy Bigelow. As of May 2009, the script was reportedly finished, but the project never materialized.

== Home video ==
The film was first telecast on The ABC Sunday Night Movie on March 13 and June 26, 1966 in a pan-and-scan, slightly edited format. After these two network telecasts, the film was sold to local stations. It was shown on Turner Classic Movies for the first time on April 18, 2013 in letterbox format and anamorphically enhanced in its proper aspect ratio.

Carousel first appeared in home-video format in September 1990. The DVD edition debuted in 1999 and was rereleased in November 2006 for the film's 50th anniversary, concurrent with the 50th-anniversary release of The King and I and South Pacific. All three films were released as a two-disc special edition with bonus material, including audio commentary.

== See also ==
- List of American films of 1956
- List of films about angels
