= Susan Luckey =

American actress (1938-2012)

- Luckey in the 60s
- Born: Suzanne Dolores Luckey; April 4, 1938; Hollywood, California, U.S.
- Died: November 29, 2012 (aged 74); Los Angeles, California, U.S.
- Occupation: Actress
- Years active: 1954–1966
- Spouse: Larry Douglas (m. 1964; died 1996)

Suzanne Dolores Luckey (April 4, 1938 – November 29, 2012) was an American actress, best known for her roles in the musical films Carousel (1956) and The Music Man (1962).

== Early years ==
Luckey was born in Hollywood, California, where her father was a sound editor in the film industry. She graduated in 1956 from Hollywood Professional School. Luckey had a romance with race car driver Jack Martin while in her early teens.

== Career ==
=== Stage ===
Luckey performed on Broadway during the 1950s, including the original 1954 adaptation of Peter Pan and Take Me Along.

=== Television ===
On television, Luckey was cast in The George Burns and Gracie Allen Show. She also appeared in the television movie version of Annie Get Your Gun in 1957. In 1957, she starred in the Telephone Time episode "Castle Dangerous".

=== Film ===
Luckey's best known film roles were in Carousel and The Music Man. She co-starred as Louise, the daughter of Billy Bigelow, played by Gordon MacRae, in Carousel. She appeared as Zaneeta, the daughter of Mayor Shinn (portrayed by Paul Ford), in The Music Man, repeating the role she had in the national company of that musical. Her last film was the 1966 small movie, Step Out of Your Mind.

== Family ==
In 1964, Luckey married actor Larry Douglas, who had divorced Onna White, Music Man's choreographer, in 1959. They remained married until his death in 1996.

Luckey died in her home in Los Angeles, California, on November 29, 2012, at the age of 74, due to liver failure. She was survived by her daughter, Shayna.
