= Jasper High School (Indiana) =

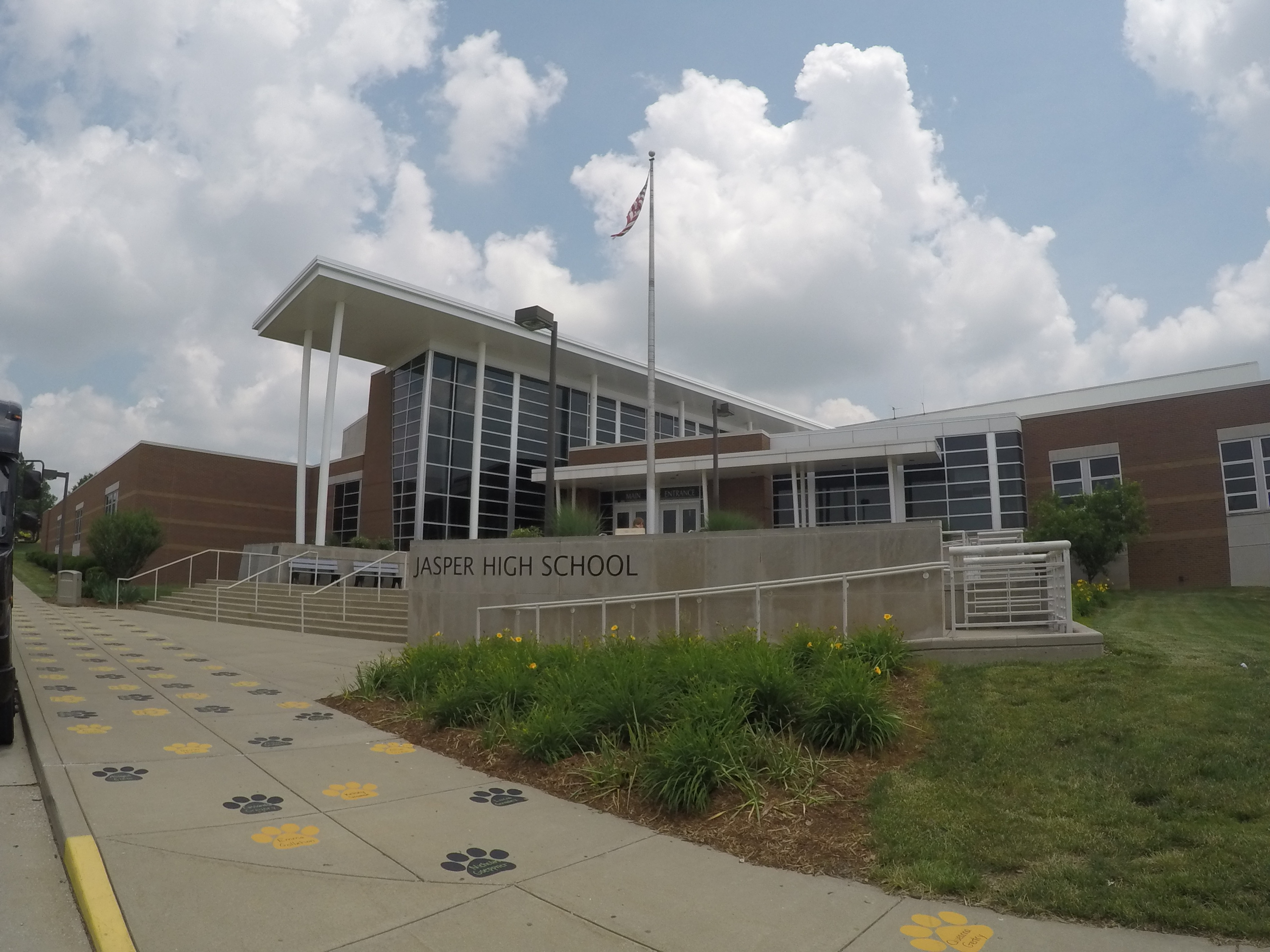

Location
- 1600 Saint Charles Street; Jasper, Indiana 47546; United States; 38°24′9″N 86°57′0″W

Information
- Type: Public high school
- Motto: Learning for Life
- Established: 1978
- School district: Greater Jasper Consolidated Schools
- Principal: Geoff Mauck
- Teaching staff: 62.50 (FTE)
- Grades: 9–12
- Enrollment: 1,100 (2023–2024)
- Student to teacher ratio: 17.60
- Color
- Song: "Indiana, Our Indiana"
- Athletics conference: Southern Indiana Athletic Conference
- Nickname: Wildcats
- Rival: Vincennes Lincoln High School; Southridge High School
- Gym capacity: 4,800
- Website: Official website

Jasper High School (JHS) is a public high school located in Jasper, Indiana, United States. It serves grades 9 through 12, and is the only high school in the Greater Jasper Consolidated Schools district. The principal is Geoff Mauck. JHS has an enrollment of approximately 1,050 students. The school's colors are black and gold. The school song is set to the tune "Indiana, Our Indiana", and the mascot is the wildcat.

== History ==
Jasper High School was built in 1978 and subsequent remodeling was carried out in 2002. The facilities include 206,000 square feet, built on 50 acres of land.

In 2014, JHS was recognized as an Indiana "four star school".

Jasper draws students from the Bainbridge, Madison and Boone townships in Dubois County.

=== Gym collapse ===
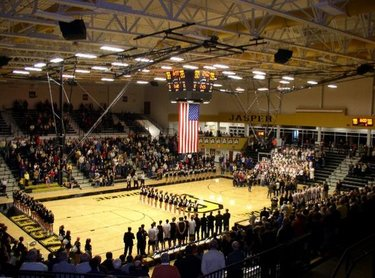
New gymnasium at JHS

On May 2, 2011, the main gym collapsed due to a buildup of rainwater on the roof, causing the school to be temporarily closed. The school used the Cabby O'Neill Gymnasium, located near the courthouse on 6th Street, as a temporary replacement while a new gymnasium was built. This was the first time the Cabby O’Neill had hosted Jasper High School athletic events since 1977. The school rebuilt the gymnasium and an open house and dedication ceremony was held on September 20, 2013. The new gymnasium has a seating capacity of 4,800.

== Demographics ==
The demographic breakdown of the 1,095 students enrolled in 2013–2014 was:

- Male – 51.0%
- Female – 49.0%
- Native American/Alaskan – 0.2%
- Asian/Pacific islanders – 0.8%
- Black – 0.4%
- Hispanic – 7.9%
- White – 90.3%
- Multiracial – 0.4%

21.0% of the students were eligible for free or reduced lunch.

== Athletics ==
Jasper High School IHSAA Athletic State Championships
Sport	Titles	Year(s)
Boys' baseball (Class AAA)	3	1998, 2000, 2006
Boys' baseball (Single-Class)	3	1996, 1997, 2021
Boys' football (Class AAAA)	1	2001
Boys' tennis	1	1999
Boys' basketball (Single-Class)	1	1949
Total	8

Eight Jasper High School athletic teams have won Indiana High School Athletic Association state championships, most recently in 2006. Boys' basketball captured the school's first title in 1949, winning the state's iconic single class postseason tournament. The Wildcats beat Madison, 62–61, at Butler Fieldhouse in Indianapolis.

The baseball team won its first of six state championships, and three in a row, in 1996, after beating Merrillville, 13–6, at Bush Stadium in Indianapolis. The following year, which was the final year of the single class system, Jasper won another championship after defeating Carmel, 10–8, at Victory Field, home of the Indianapolis Indians, Triple A affiliate of the Pittsburgh Pirates. In 1998, for the third straight year, Jasper's baseball team beat Westfield in the 3A title game, 11–2.

The 4th baseball championship was won in 2000 when the Wildcats routed Plymouth High School, 10–3. In 2006, the baseball team (34–1) defeated Norwell 13–12 for their 5th title. In 2010, the Wildcats returned to Victory Field but came up short, losing to Andrean. They came up short on their next three trips to State – in 2013 losing to Norwell, in 2015 losing to Andrean, and in 2017 losing to South Bend St. Joseph. In 2021, the Wildcats went 31–2 en route to their 6th state title, beating Fishers 3–1. Most recently, on June 20, 2025, Jasper once again faced Andrean, which for the third time thwarted the Wildcats and their bid for a 7th state championship; JHS lost 4–3.

In 1999, the boys' tennis team returned from North Central High School with a state title after beating Center Grove by a team score of 3–2.

In 2001, the football team won its first state championship after beating Delta, 35–20, in the old RCA Dome in Indianapolis.

== Notable alumni ==
- Mike Braun (1972) – governor of Indiana.
- Spike Gehlhausen (1972) – Indianapolis 500 driver
- Arnold Habig (1925) – founder of Kimball International
- Paul Hoffman (1943) – basketball player in the NBA and 4 time All-American at Purdue University; league champion in 1947–48
- Michael Lewis (1996) – Ball State basketball coach
- Shane Lindauer (1992) – member of the Indiana House of Representatives
- Matt Mauck (1997) – football player: LSU Tigers football starting quarterback; former NFL player with Tennessee Titans and Denver Broncos
- Scott Rolen (1993) – Major League Baseball player, MLB All Star, Gold Glove, World Series Champion, Hall of Fame Class of 2023; former member of Philadelphia Phillies, St. Louis Cardinals, Toronto Blue Jays and Cincinnati Reds

== See also ==
- List of high schools in Indiana
