= Composite print =

A composite print is a type of release print of a motion picture in which both sound and picture are printed alongside each other on the same film. A motion picture originally consists of multiple components on separate media, including the visual image, the sound as recorded on-set, the musical score, and the sound effects. All of these are eventually combined into a composite print. A composite print is also known as a synchronized print. or a married print (UK).

== Variations ==
During the 1950s and 1960s, some movie showings would have the sound and picture running on separate machines. This was especially necessary in the three-strip Cinerama technique because the projected image was composed from three separate running films projected side-by-side on a very large and deeply curved screen. The seven-track sound was recorded on magnetic tape, which ran simultaneously with the three projectors.

In the case of some films, such as the world premiere engagement of Carousel, which was made in CinemaScope 55, a six-track soundtrack could not be accommodated on the film, so the sound was played on an interlocking tape machine. The general release of the film, however, used the standard four-track stereo soundtrack printed alongside the visual image on the film.
