= Millersport, Indiana =

- Unincorporated community
- Location within Indiana Location within the United States
- Coordinates: 38°20′35″N 87°03′14″W
- Country: United States
- State: Indiana
- County: Dubois
- Township: Madison
- Elevation: 463 ft (141 m)
- Time zone: UTC-5 (Eastern (EST))
  - Summer (DST): UTC-4 (EDT)
- ZIP code: 47590
- Area codes: 812, 930
- GNIS feature ID: 439234

Millersport is an unincorporated community in Madison Township, Dubois County, in the U.S. state of Indiana.

== History ==
Millersport was founded in 1833. The community was named for its founder, Stephen McDonald Miller.
