= Evon Streetman =

American photographer (born 1932)

- Born: 1932 (age 93–94); Fort Meade, Florida, United States
- Education: Florida State University (1954)
- Known for: Photography

Evon Streetman (born 1932) is an American photographer. Streetman's primary subject is Florida, where she lives.

== Life ==
Evon Streetman was born in 1932 in Fort Meade, Florida. From an early age, Streetman was surrounded by artistic people including her maternal grandmother, a painter, her paternal grandfather, a metalsmith and woodworker, as well as her father, a woodworker, taxidermist and craftsman.

She studied painting at Florida State University where she earned her Bachelor of Fine Art in 1954 and began graduate work. "Her undergraduate and graduate studies at Florida State University were focused on painting and the traditional arts[...]," according to the Samuel P. Harn Museum of Art. She returned to Tallahassee in 1957 to open her own commercial photography studio. In the mid sixties she helped develop photography curriculum at Florida State and a photography program at Penland School in North Carolina. During this time, Streeman's photography style became more experimental, employing her painting techniques and use of gold and silver leaf on moistened photographic prints. In 1980, she was interviewed for Kalliope, a journal of women's art and literature, which published a spread of her photographs.
