= Arnold Doren =

American photographer

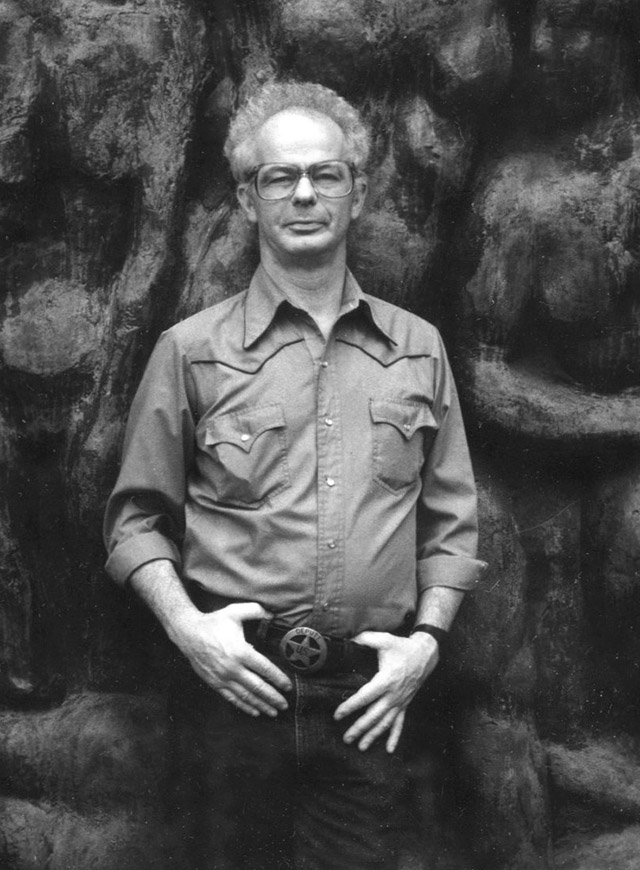
- Arnold Doren in 1985
- Born: July 29, 1935; Chicago, Illinois, U.S.
- Died: September 15, 2003 (aged 68); Greensboro, North Carolina, U.S.
- Known for: Photography

Arnold Doren (1935–2003) was an American photographer.

== Youth ==
Arnold T. Dorenfeld, known as Doren, was born in Chicago, July 29, 1935, to Hy and Rose Dorenfeld. He grew up on the west side of Chicago, attending Howland Elementary School and Farragut High School (now Farragut Career Academy) (per classmate and friend Howard N. Allen, M.D.). An encounter with a Graflex camera while working on the high school newspaper (The Scroll) led to a dedicated life in photography. After joining the Navy in 1953, he was stationed at San Diego, CA and worked as a submariner running missions to Acapulco. News with Views was the name of the Navy newsletter which published his photographs.

== Education ==
A turning point occurred when he enrolled at Rochester Institute of Technology in 1957 where his philosophy and purpose in life were clarified by Minor White, one of the legendary professors. It was the deeply spiritual nature of Minor White along with his knowledge of poetry and Eastern philosophy that affected Doren. Minor put an emphasis on feeling as a way of knowing and realizing a multitude of meanings. A quote by Peter Layton describes Minor's teaching. " He created an atmosphere for constantly questioning ideas or responses." With careful observation, the students of Minor White were shown how to seek an emotional equivalence to the scene in front of them. Minor White was inspired by Alfred Stieglitz's theory (Equivalents) from the 1920s. It was under Minor's influence that Doren began to photograph what he called Americana Faces which was a documentation of the land and its people from 1960 to 2003. A "face" was not just a human face but included everything in the land and sky. He photographed throughout the US and returned frequently to the southwest. While working on the Americana Faces, he produced other documentary series during extended visits to Italy, Greece, Scotland and China. Related to Doren's documentary photographs were experimental works, including a series on "light", that was inspired by Minor White and by another influential teacher, Ralph Hattersley.

== New York City 1960-1978 ==
During Doren's NYC years, he worked as a commercial photographer for Alan Vogel, Arnold T. Rosenberg, Irving Penn and Erwin Blumenthal while living in a one-room apartment and frequenting jazz clubs, poetry readings and art openings. Doren wrote extensively about his years in NYC with and without his first wife, Elizabeth Knox, a painter. He committed to several personal projects such as photographing the same NYC street for one hour per day for several years. The NYC street project was partly inspired by his neighbor, Berenice Abbott. Doren's series on the Woodstock Festival resulted in his well-known photograph of Jimi Hendrix.

== 1978-2003 ==
After accepting a teaching position in 1978 at the University of North Carolina at Greensboro, Doren helped to shape the growing respect for photography as art. He educated thousands of students, participated in numerous exhibitions, operated a photography gallery and gained national and international recognition for his work. Often he introduced himself on the first day of class with My name is Doren and photography is my life. Doren's second wife, Caroline Cornish, 1924–2008, was a noted photographer who possessed organizational skills that provided stability for both of them while allowing Doren extra freedom to pursue a fine arts career.

== Publications ==
- "The Photographer Collector's Guide" Lee Witkin and B. London, NY Graphic Society, 1982
- "An Index to American Collections" The George Eastman House of Photography, G. K. Hall and Co. Publishing, Boston, 1983
- "Who is Who in American Art" R. R. Bowker Publishers, NY, 1989–90, 1991–91, 1995–96
- "Aperture" 10–3, 1962
- "Photographing Children", Time Life Library of Photography, 1971
- Octave to Prayer "Aperture", 1974
- "Italy Observed in Photography and Literature", Rizzoli Publishing, NY, 1989
- "Exploring Color Photography" by Robert Hirsh, W. B. Brown Publishing, 1991

== Selected collections ==
- George Eastman House, Rochester, NY
- Massachusetts Institute of Technology, Cambridge, Massachusetts
- Museum of the Rhode Island School of Design, Providence, RI
- Dallas Museum of Art, Dallas, TX
- Grey Gallery of Art New York University, NYC
- Phillip Morris Collection, Cabarrus County, NC
- Dillard Collection, "Weatherspoon Art Gallery", University of North Carolina at Greensboro
- Meridian Museum of Art, Meridian, Mississippi
- Indiana Historical Society, Indianapolis, Indiana
