= Harn Museum of Art =

Coordinates: 29°38′13″N 82°22′12″W

Samuel P. Harn Museum of Art
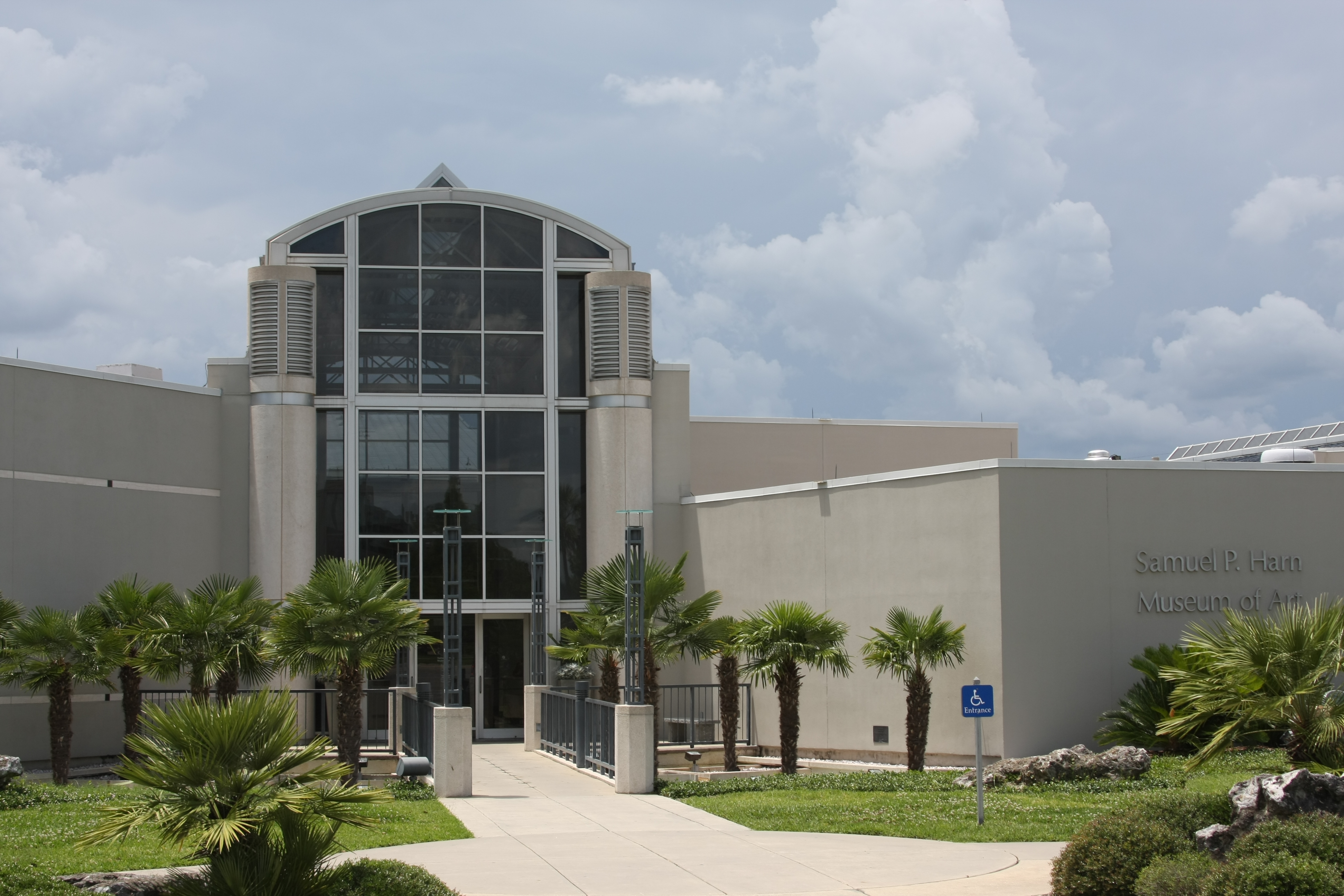
- Established: 1990
- Location: University of Florida; Gainesville, Florida
- Type: Art Museum
- Accreditation: American Alliance of Museums
- Collection size: 11,300
- Director: Lee Anne Chesterfield
- Curator: Dulce Román
- Architect: Kha Le-Huu
- Website: harn.ufl.edu

The Samuel P. Harn Museum of Art is an art museum at the University of Florida in Gainesville, Florida. It is in the UF Cultural Plaza area in the southwest part of campus.

The Harn is a 112,800-square-foot facility, making it one of the largest university art museums in the South. This includes 40,400 square feet of exhibition space, 5 garden spaces, a 250-seat auditorium, a museum store, a study center, a café, and classroom spaces. The museum has a permanent collection and an array of temporary exhibitions. The Harn's permanent collection totals more than 11,300 objects, which are focused on Asian, African, modern and contemporary art, as well as photography. The museum sponsors international and Florida-centric exhibitions. The university sponsors educational programs at the museum including films, lectures, interactive activities, and school and family offerings.

In October 2005, the Harn expanded by more than 18,000 square feet (1,700 m^{2}) with the opening of the Mary Ann Harn Cofrin Pavilion, which includes new educational and meeting areas and the Camellia Court Cafe, the first eatery for visitors of the Cultural Plaza. In August 2021, it was announced that it would be expanding with a new wing of 20,000 square-feet.

The museum is accredited by the American Alliance of Museums. UF offers a virtual tour for prospective visitors.

== History ==
The Harn Museum of Art is named in honor of Samuel Peebles Harn (1893–1957), whose widow, three daughters, sons-in-law, and grandchildren made the founding gift to UF for the museum’s construction. The family pledged more than $3 million for the construction of an arts museum in 1983. The Harn Museum of Art opened September 20, 1990.

In 2000, the family of David A. Cofrin made a gift to fund an 18,000-square-foot addition. The addition, named the Mary Ann Harn Cofrin Pavilion, opened in October 2005. The Cofrin Pavilion features 6,500 feet of exhibition space for international contemporary art, the Camellia Court Café, an outdoor plaza and the Goforth Learning Center, which is used for meetings, programs and educational activities.

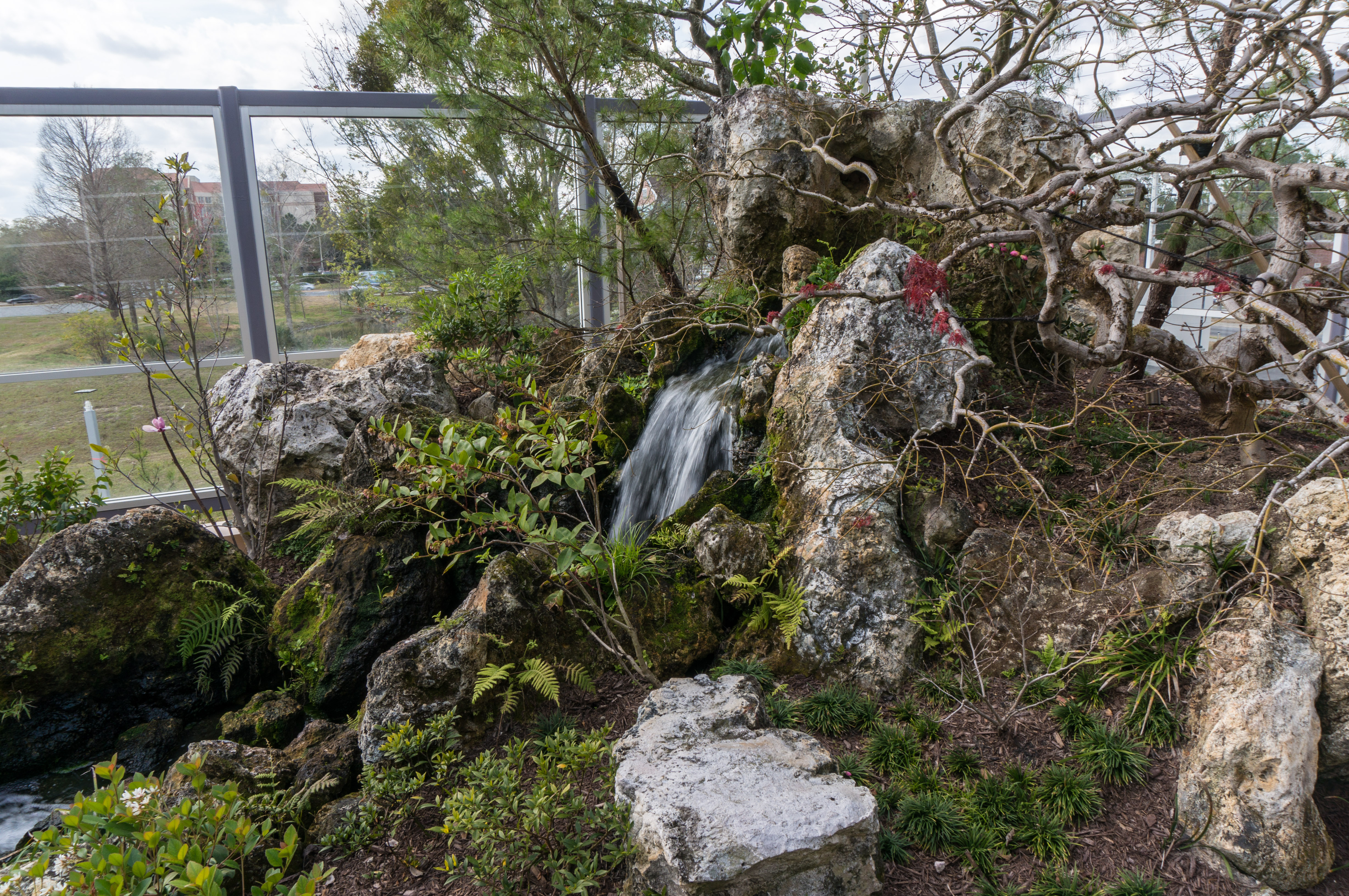
Outdoor garden alongside the Asian art wing

On February 6, 2008, Dr. and Mrs. David A. Cofrin made a commitment of $10 million to the University of Florida to fund the addition of a new wing dedicated to Asian art. Opened in 2012 on the northwest side of the museum, the 26,000-square-foot addition features an Asian art gallery, curatorial offices, and art storage and conservation space for the Asian collections. The expansion included an outdoor Asian garden to complement the new wing.

== Management ==
The founding director of the Harn Museum of Art was Budd Harris Bishop, who was previously at the Columbus Museum of Art. He joined in 1987 and selected the architect, hired staff and significantly built up the collection during his tenure. Bishop served as director through 1998.

Rebecca Nagy served as museum director for 16 years until her retirement in 2018.

In July 2018, Lee Anne Chesterfield (from the Virginia Museum of Fine Arts) began serving as the Harn Museum's director.

== Architecture ==
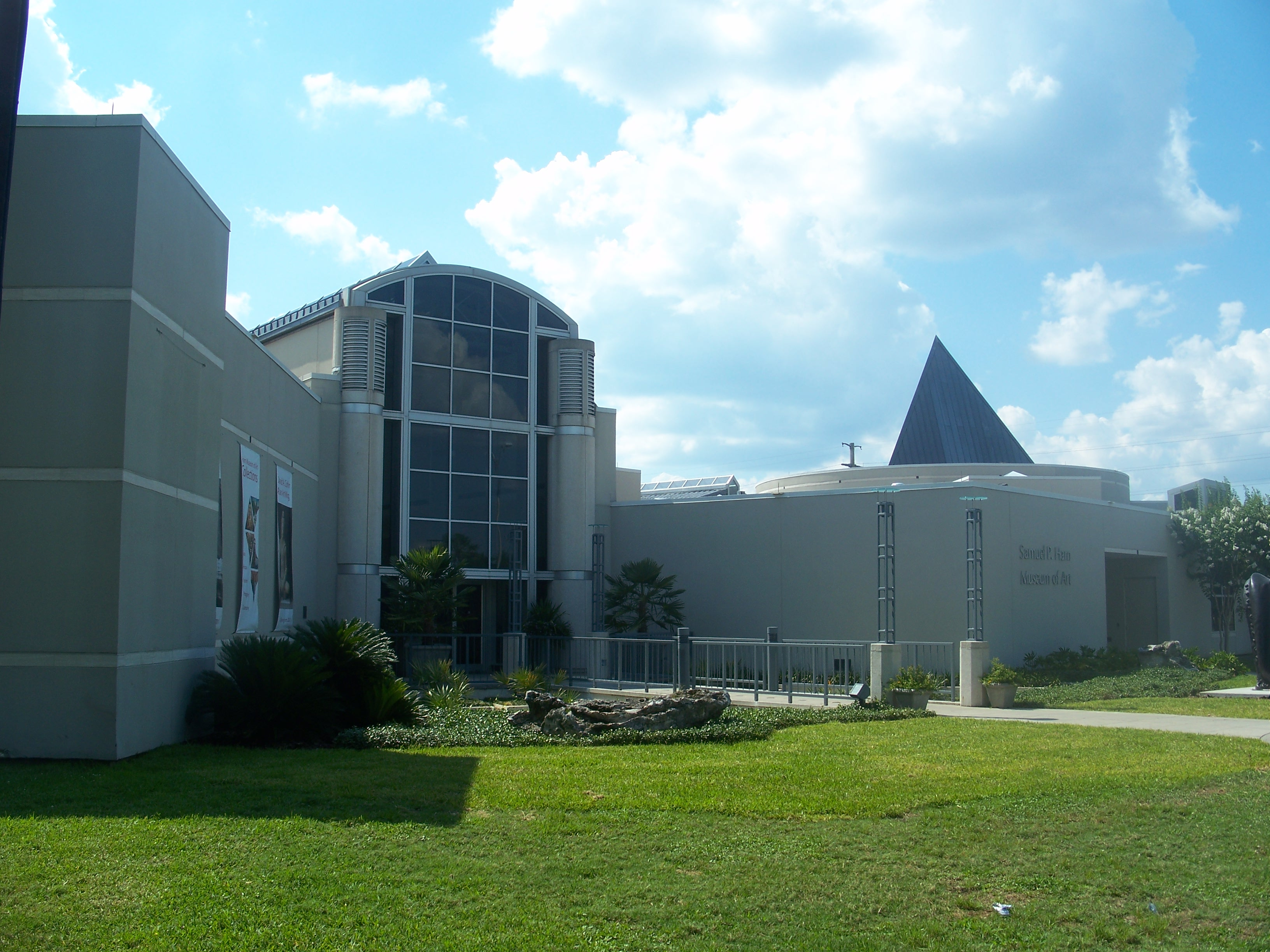
Harn Museum architecture

The original architecture for the Harn Museum was designed by Kha Le-Huu, a native of South Vietnam and a 1982 architecture alumni of the University of Florida. Le-Huu reportedly designed the building to include buddhist sensibilities in the entrance garden along with featuring his contemporary aesthetic for geometric elements including use of the tetrahedron. Kha Le-Huu & Partners of Orlando, Florida also designed the additional wing for Asian art, completed in 2011.

The Harn Museum features several outdoor gardens including an Asian Water Garden and an Asian Rock Garden designed by Hoichi Kurisu of Kurisu International. The Arts in Medicine (AIM) program at the University of Florida works together with patients to generate new patterns for the zen rock garden as a form of therapy at the Harn Museum. Two additional gardens, by landscape designer Aaron Lee Wiener, are viewable from the galleries.

== Collections ==
The Harn's collections include over 10,000 works of art, these are displayed at the museum or other institutions through art-loan programs and traveling exhibits. The collection consists of work focused on African, Asian, modern and contemporary art, and photography. The Harn also has Ancient American and Oceanic art, and a collection of pre-1850s prints and drawings.

=== African Collection ===
The work in the African collection ranges from the 5th century BCE to the 21st century. The mediums found in this collection range through wood sculpture, textiles, ceramics, leatherwork, beadwork, metalwork, and paintings. The collection is focused on West African art, but contains works from different ethnic groups from West, Central, South, and East Africa. An early and important part of the collection were wooden sculptures, in particular masks and figures.

=== Asian Collection ===
The Asian collection ranges from the Neolithic period to contemporary works. The mediums in this collection are ceramics, jades, metalwork, stone sculptures, paintings, and prints. This collection contains over 2,000 works displaying a diverse range of art. It features works from India, Japan, and China, among many other Asian countries.

=== Contemporary Collection ===
The works in the Contemporary collection ranges from 1945 to the present day, with the mediums included being paintings, photography, multi-media, installation, and film. This collection contains almost 1,500 items from major contemporary art movements and from emerging artists around the world. The works from this collection are presented using thematic exhibitions.

=== Modern Collection ===
The Modern collection ranges from the mid-19th century to the first half of the 20th century. The mediums in this collection are paintings, sculpture, prints, and drawings. The collection contains nearly 1,000 works from Europe and the Americas. Many works represent the major movements in American art, such as Impressionism, Post-Impressionism, and early Modernism, among others. The European works represent France, Italy, Germany and Spain. There is also a growing collection of Latin American art from Mexico, Chile, Uruguay, Guatemala, Brazil, and Puerto Rico.

=== Photography Collection ===
The Photography collection ranges from the 19th century to contemporary works, with the mediums included going from daguerreotypes to large-scale color prints. The collections' origins began through the acquisition of noted photographers such as Robert Frank and Irving Penn, but as photography became a collecting focus more work from a diverse range of photographers has been acquired. A strong point for the collection is the works of Jerry Uelsmann, who established the University of Florida as a center for the study of photography. The collection also contains the works of many others who either taught or were students at the University of Florida.

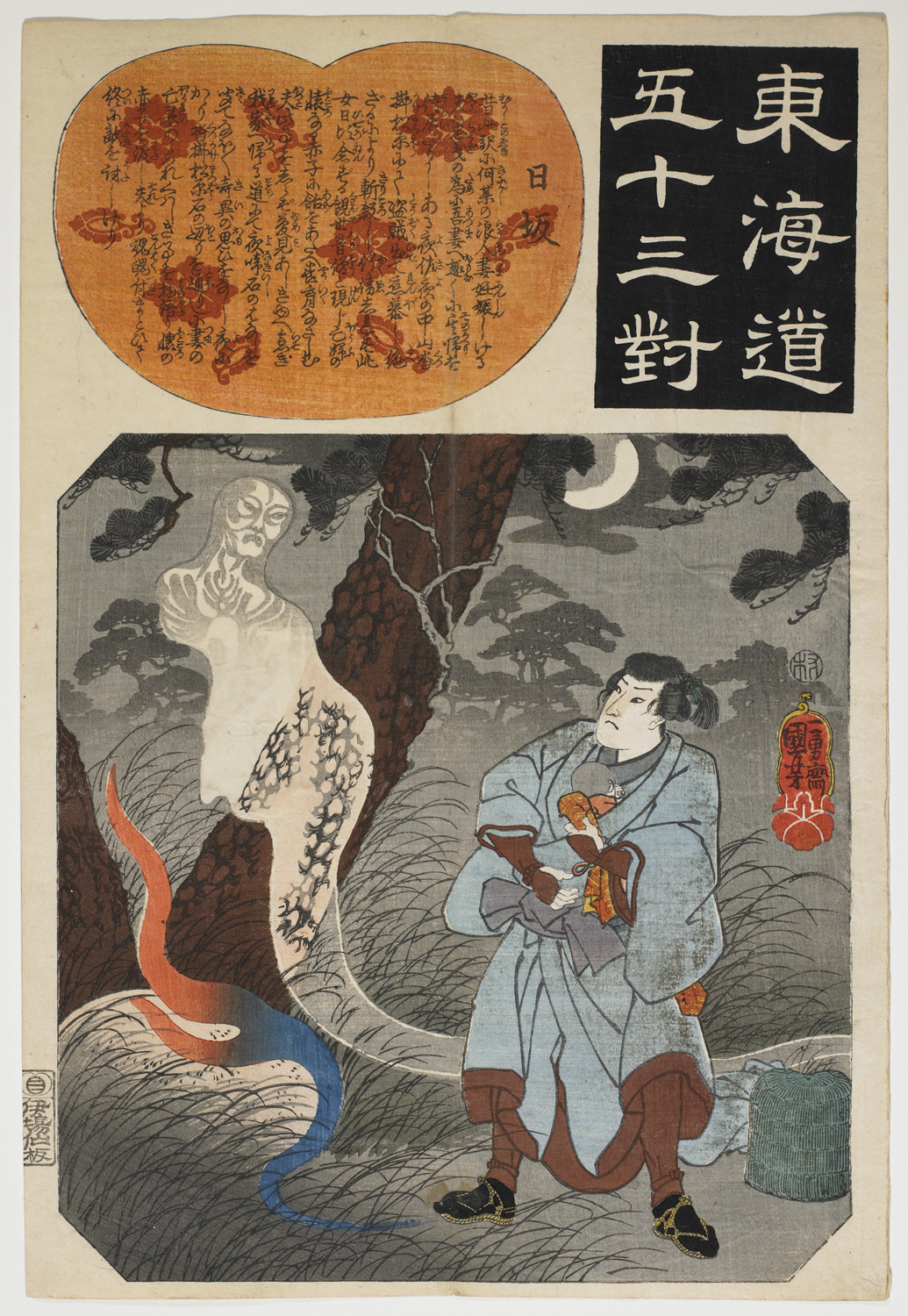
Utagawa Kuniyoshi

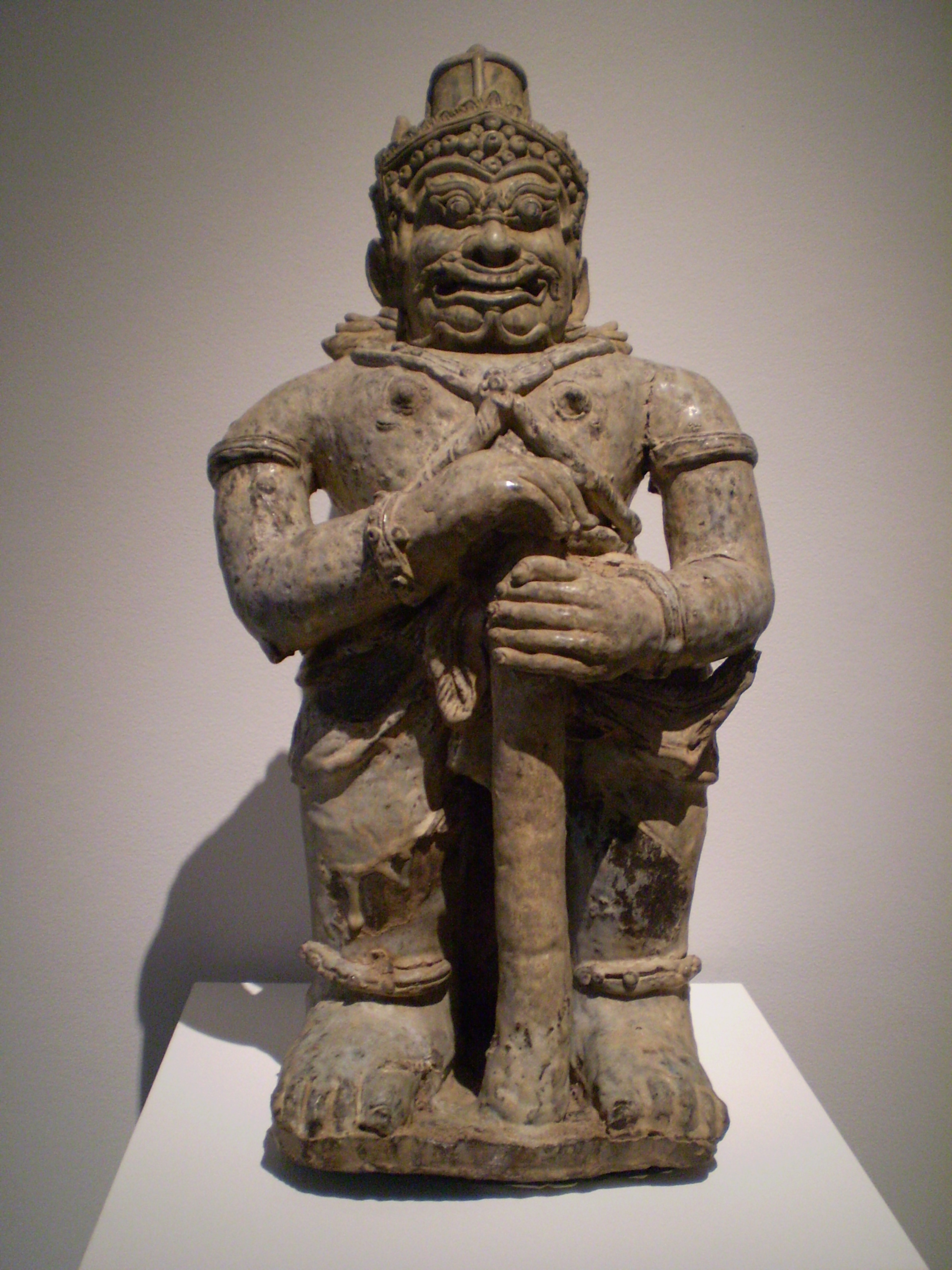
Dvarapala

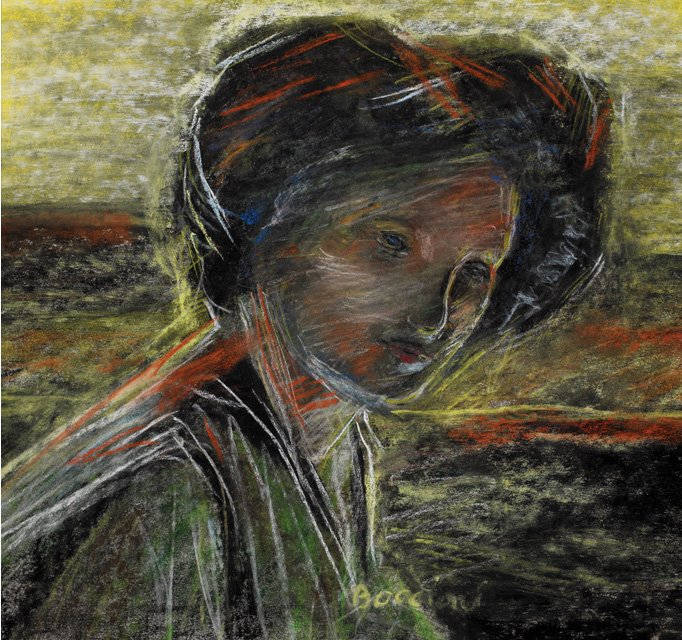
Umberto Boccioni

== Selected artists ==
Among others, the following artists are represented in the museum:

- Ansel Adams
- El Anatsui
- George Bellows
- Ross Bleckner
- Deborah Butterfield
- Maria Magdalena Campos-Pons
- Agustín Cárdenas
- Honoré Daumier
- Rineke Dijkstra
- Friedel Dzubas
- Carlos Alberto Estevez Carasa
- Lazaro Saavedra Gonzalez
- Childe Hassam
- Hermann Herzog

- Candida Hofer
- William Hogarth
- Manuel Mendive Hoyo
- William Morris Hunt
- Robert Hutter
- Ken Josephson
- William Kentridge
- Yayoi Kusama
- Nikki S. Lee
- Sol LeWitt
- Armando Marino
- Claude Monet
- Elsa Mora

- Zwelethu Mthethwa
- Ingrid Mwangi
- Helmut Newton
- Timothy H. O'Sullivan
- Salvator Rosa
- Stephen De Staebler
- Evon Streetman
- George Sugarman
- Maggie Taylor
- Alexey Titarenko
- Jerry Uelsmann
- Sergio Vega
- Minor White
- Betty Woodman

== See also ==
- University of Florida
- Buildings at the University of Florida
