= Greater Jasper Consolidated Schools =

School district in Indiana, United States

Address
- 1520 Saint Charles Street, Suite 1 Jasper, Indiana, 47546; United States

District information
- Grades: K-12
- Superintendent: Tracy Lorey
- Schools: 4
- NCES District ID: 1803960

Other information
- Website: www.gjcs.k12.in.us

Greater Jasper Consolidated Schools is a school district in Dubois County, Indiana. Its district covers the Central and Northwest parts of the county. The district's Superintendent is Dr. Tracy Lorey,

== Consolidated Elementary School ==
On April 19, 2017, it was announced that Greater Jasper Consolidated Schools proposed to consolidate Fifth Street Elementary and Tenth Street Elementary into a single building. On the night of June 26, 2017, the school board voted unanimously for the project to be green-lit. On March 4, 2020, GJCS announced that construction would wrap up in April, and students would move in for the 2020–2021 school year in August.

As of the 2019–2020 school year, there are 3,203 students. In the 2016–17 school year, there were 218 teachers.

Greater Jasper Consolidated Schools serves the communities of Jasper, Ireland, Portersville, Maltersville, among others.

== Schools ==
=== High school ===
- Jasper High School (9–12)

=== Middle school ===
- Jasper Middle School (6–8)

=== Elementary schools ===
- Jasper Elementary School (PK–5)
- Ireland Elementary School (PK–5)

== Exceptional children's school ==
- Exceptional Children's Cooperative
