= Arnold T. Rosenberg =

American photographer

- Born: November 29, 1931
- Died: March 21, 2017 (aged 85)
- Occupation: Photographer
- Known for: Photographs of Marcel Duchamp

Arnold T. Rosenberg (November 29, 1931 – March 21, 2017) was a photographer.

== Childhood ==
Rosenberg was born alongside his identical twin brother Allen on November 29, 1931.

== Career ==
He began his career in the 1950s as an assistant to Irving Penn. In 1961, Rosenberg opened his own commercial photography studio in New York City. He traveled to China in 1979, taking a series of pictures that capture the essence of the people and the landscape, at a time when the country was in the process of undergoing dramatic social and political changes. His photographs have been featured in national and international magazines, Opera News, The New York Times, New York Magazine, Gourmet Magazine, and Food & Wine.

He is best known for several photographs he took in 1958 of the French artist Marcel Duchamp, especially one of him moving chess pieces behind a sheet of glass. Examples of Rosenberg's photographs are in the permanent collection of the Museum of Modern Art, New York, the Philadelphia Museum of Art, and the National Portrait Gallery, Smithsonian Institution, Washington, D.C. He lived in East Hampton, New York, with his wife Rochelle.
