= Kimball International =

American furniture manufacturer

Coordinates: 38°24′05″N 86°55′14″W

Kimball International, Inc.
- Formerly: Jasper Corporation
- Type: Subsidiary
- Traded as: Nasdaq: KBAL
- Industry: Furniture
- Predecessor: W.W. Kimball & Company
- Founded: 1950; 76 years ago, in Jasper, Indiana
- Founder: Arnold Habig
- Headquarters: Jasper, Indiana
- Area served: Worldwide
- Products: Furniture
- Brands: Kimball
- Number of employees: 2500
- Parent: HNI Corporation
- Subsidiaries: Krakauer Brothers
- Website: kimballinternational.com

Kimball International, Inc. is an American company which consists of furniture brands: Kimball, National, Interwoven, Etc., David Edward, D'Style and Kimball Hospitality. It is the successor to W.W. Kimball and Company, the world's largest piano and organ manufacturer at certain times in the 19th and 20th centuries.

On March 8, 2023, HNI Corporation entered into an agreement to purchase Kimball International. On June 1, 2023, the acquisition was completed.

== History ==
=== Kimball Piano and Organ ===
This division started as a piano dealership in Chicago in 1857 as W.W. Kimball and Company by William Wallace Kimball (1828–1904). In 1864, Kimball moved from its earliest location in the corner of a jewelry store to sales rooms in the Crosby Opera House where Kimball sold pianos made by East Coast piano makers Chickering and Sons and others. Kimball also sold less expensive reed organs. The Great Chicago Fire destroyed all of Kimball's commercial assets in 1871, but he continued selling from his home, and rebuilt his dealership business.

In 1877, W.W. Kimball began assembling its own reed organs, using actions made by the J.G. Earhuff Company and cases made by contractors. After three years, the company began offering organs made entirely in house. In 1882, the Kimball company was incorporated, and an expansive factory was built to produce reed organs. Soon, the factory was producing 15,000 organs a year; the world's largest organ maker. Kimball stopped making reed organs in 1922 after having produced 403,390 instruments.

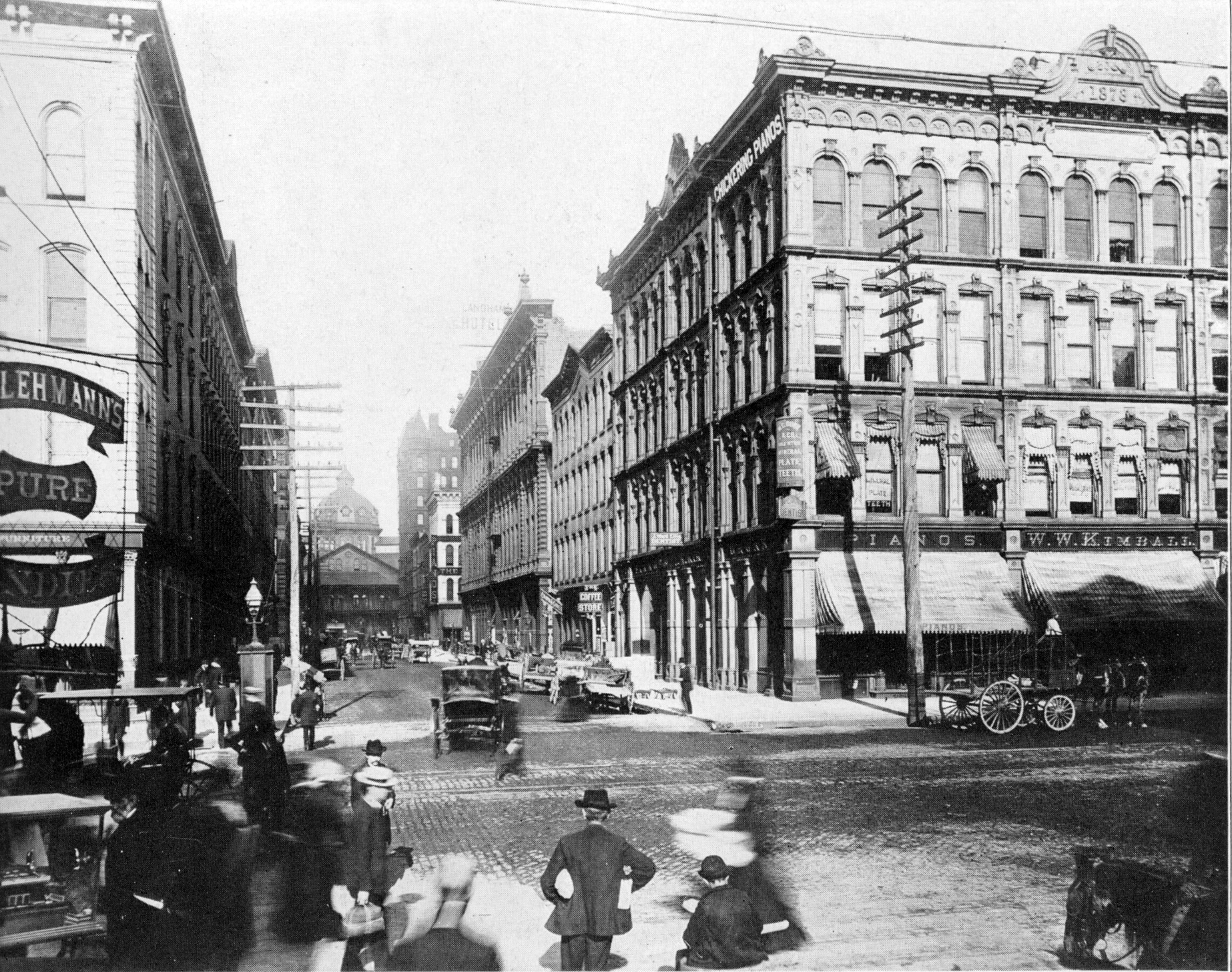
The Chicago Kimball building in the 1880s

In 1887, Kimball began building a five-story factory for making its own pianos, and the next year produced 500 instruments of unremarkable quality. Kimball hired veterans from Steinway & Sons and C. Bechstein Pianofortefabrik, and these men initiated improvements to the piano line. By 1893 at the World's Columbian Exposition, at which Kimball received the "Worlds Columbian Exposition Award", Kimball was known for high quality, efficiency in manufacture, and aggressive sales practices using 35–40 traveling salesmen to cover cities and remote areas. Prominent East Coast piano makers snubbed the Chicago exposition because they feared Chicago favoritism, and because of philosophical differences between their reliance on traditional name brand faithfulness and Kimball's streamlined modern efficiency which greatly threatened their sales.

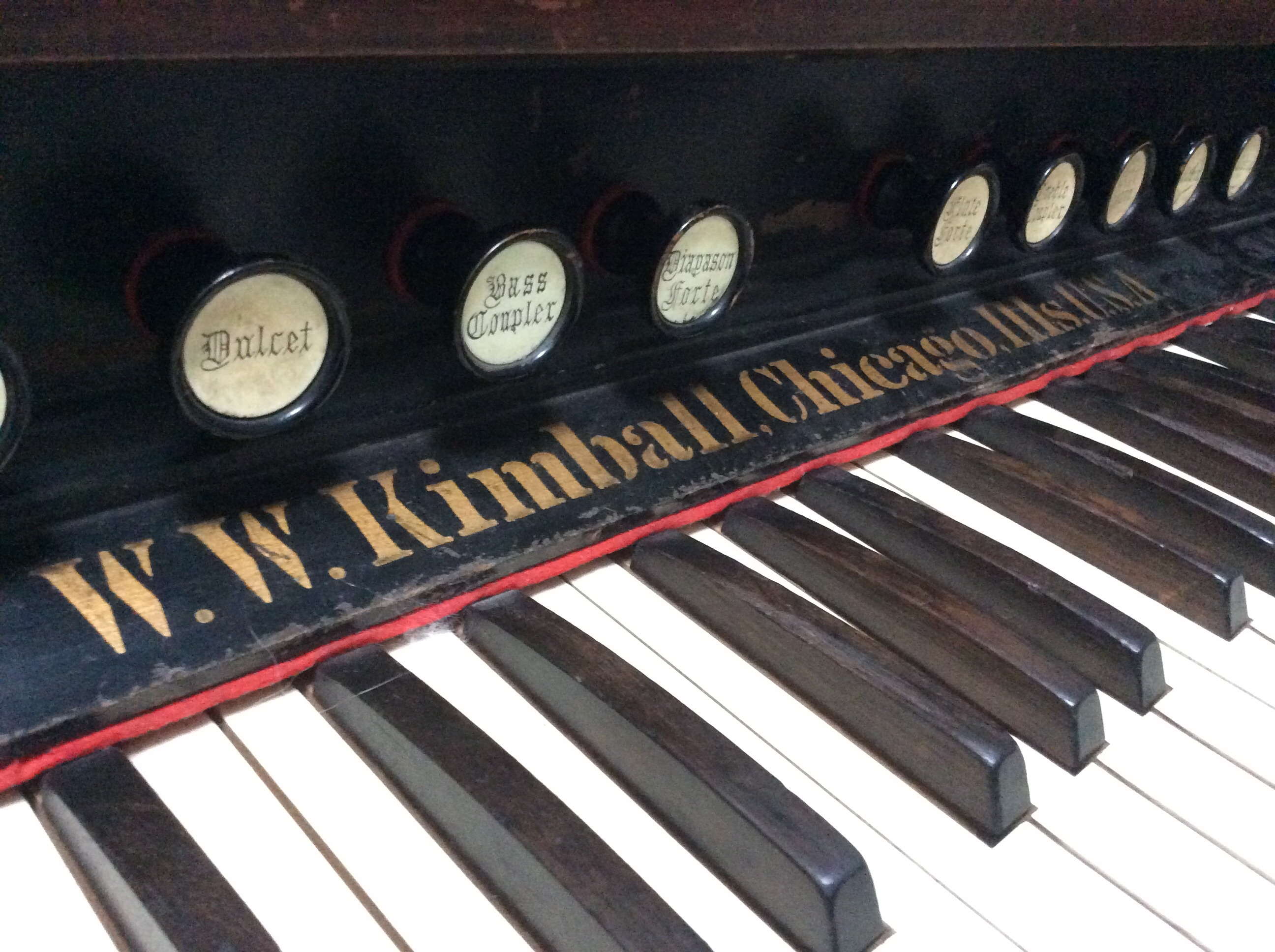
A Kimball Reed Organ.

In 1890, Kimball hired Englishman Frederic W. Hedgeland, trained at his family's organworks in London: W.M. Hedgeland. Hedgeland supervised a portable pipe organ design about the size of a large upright piano. The pipe organ division of Kimball also built large, permanent pipe organs, including one for the Mormon Tabernacle in 1901. When the pipe organ division was closed down in 1942, some 7,326 models had been built.

Kimball was involved in making player pianos, the first effort being an automatic mechanism in 1901. As well, from 1916 to 1929, Kimball produced an attractive line of cabinet phonographs. The company built a new building, the Kimball Building, in 1916. It is now the Lewis Center at DePaul University.

During World War II, Kimball produced aircraft parts for major military airplane manufacturers such as Boeing, Douglas and Lockheed. After the war, piano production resumed but a series of poor financial decisions by W.W. Kimball Jr led the company into decline. In the mid-1950s, Kimball built a luxurious new factory in the Chicago suburb of Melrose Park, Illinois, but the factory's high costs, its poor performance, and flagging sales brought the company into grave financial crisis. Kimball had slipped from being the world's largest piano maker to the seventh largest, and it was nearly insolvent.

In 1959, the W.W. Kimball Company was purchased from the last remaining Kimball family heir by Arnold Habig, becoming a wholly owned subsidiary of The Jasper Corporation which began operations in 1950 and founded by Mr. Arnold F. Habig. The combined company was later renamed Kimball International.

Piano production was relocated to the small, southern Indiana town of West Baden, Indiana, where the company was rejuvenated and once again began to grow. Ten years after the purchase, Kimball was once again the world's largest piano company.

=== Jasper Corporation to Kimball International ===
The Jasper Corporation was founded in 1950 in Jasper, Indiana, by Mr. Arnold Habig to make television cabinets, cabinets, and furniture. Jasper Corporation prospered from increasing television sales and from its investment in vertical integration, giving the company self-sufficiency. In 1959, Jasper, Inc., purchased the W. W. Kimball Company as a wholly owned subsidiary. Jasper moved its Kimball piano manufacturing to West Baden Springs in 1961. The first Indiana-made pianos were plagued with quality problems, but the issues were addressed and the pianos improved. In 1966, Jasper bought the Austrian piano maker Bösendorfer.

By 1969, Kimball had returned to its former position as the world's largest piano maker. The subsidiary made some 100,000 pianos and organs annually during its peak years in the 1960s and 1970s. On an average day 250 pianos and 150 electronic organs were shipped from the factory. Grand pianos from Kimball in Indiana ranged from compact 4-foot-5-inch (135 cm) models to larger 6-foot-7-inch (201 cm) models. In Vienna, the Bösendorfer division made concert grand pianos as large as 9 feet 6 inches (290 cm): the Imperial Bösendorfer. Kimball also made upright pianos in 42-inch (110 cm) and 46-inch (120 cm) sizes, but not smaller spinet models; a decision which allowed great profits to be made by competitors. However, Kimball produced inexpensive console pianos, between upright and spinet size, in a subsidiary plant across the Texas–Mexico border in Reynosa, doing business as Kimco.

Based on the success of piano and organ sales, Jasper determined to leverage the Kimball brand recognition to assist sales of office furniture, home furniture and electronics. Company leaders realized that the Kimball brand had far greater popular recognition than the Jasper brand, and in 1974, Jasper changed its name to Kimball International, going public in September 1976 with the initial public offering of 500,000 shares of common stock.

In 1980 Kimball International bought Krakauer Brothers, a New York piano maker founded in 1869, and Conn Keyboards, the piano and organ division of C.G. Conn ltd. The acquisitions were ill-timed, as piano and organ sales were in a long-term downward trend. In 1984, Kimball loaned 84 baby grands to the Los Angeles Olympic Organizing Committee for their use at the Los Angeles 1984 Olympic Opening Ceremony. In a section devoted to the Hollywood musical with George Gershwin's "Rhapsody in Blue" as the main theme, the 84 baby grands were rolled out under the arches of the L.A. Memorial Coliseum. Kimball operated Krakauer for five years in New York before closing the plant.

Because of a worldwide decline in piano and organ purchases through the 1980s and 1990s, the Kimball piano and organ subsidiary was discontinued in February 1996. The last Kimball grand piano was signed by every worker and company executives, and remains on display at Kimball's showroom in Jasper. The Bösendorfer piano brand continued unaffected, but was sold to Austrian buyers in 2002.

== Today ==
In 2023, Kimball International was acquired by HNI Corporation.

On October 31, 2014, Kimball International announced the spin-off of Kimball Electronics resulting in a new furniture company.

=== Kimball ===
The Kimball brand made its first desk in 1970. Kimball expanded its product range to include casegoods, seating, filing and tables.

Kimball is based in Jasper, Indiana. It had manufacturing facilities in Jasper and in Salem, and has showroom locations in major metropolitan areas around the U.S.

=== National ===
In 1980, Kimball International formed National Office Furniture to make mid-priced office furniture.

=== Kimball Hospitality ===
Kimball International entered the lodging market in 1985. Kimball Hospitality has furnished over 14,000 rooms in Las Vegas's hotels and casinos.

== Awards and honors ==
- 2016: Kimball International was again recognized with the Great Place to Work certification.
- 2015: Kimball International was recognized with the Great Place to Work designation.
- 2007: Kimball International was listed in 2007 by Forbes magazine as one of the "Platinum 400", also known as "America's Best Big Companies".
- 2006: Kimball International was honored in 2006 by “Occupational Hazards” magazine, when its Kimball Office – Cherry Street manufacturing facility was named one of the "10 Safest Companies in America".
- 2004: Kimball International was listed in 2004 by Fortune Magazine as "America's Most Admired Companies".
