= National Register of Historic Places listings in Dubois County, Indiana =

Location of Dubois County in Indiana

This is a list of the National Register of Historic Places listings in Dubois County, Indiana.

This is intended to be a complete list of the properties and districts on the National Register of Historic Places in Dubois County, Indiana, United States. Latitude and longitude coordinates are provided for many National Register properties and districts; these locations may be seen together in a map.

There are 19 properties and districts listed on the National Register in the county.

Properties and districts located in incorporated areas display the name of the municipality, while properties and districts in unincorporated areas display the name of their civil township. Properties and districts split between multiple jurisdictions display the names of all jurisdictions.

This National Park Service list is complete through NPS recent listings posted August 29, 2025.

== Current listings ==
	Name on the Register	Image	Date listed	Location	City or town	Description
1	Convent Immaculate Conception Historic District	Convent Immaculate Conception Historic District	July 13, 1983 (#83000122)	802 E. 10th St. 38°13′23″N 86°51′08″W	Ferdinand	
2	Dubois County Courthouse	Dubois County Courthouse	January 11, 1996 (#95001538)	One Courthouse Square; 38°23′29″N 86°55′52″W	Jasper	
3	Evangelische Lutherische Emanuels Kirche	Evangelische Lutherische Emanuels Kirche	February 23, 1990 (#90000329)	County Road 445E, 1 mile south of State Road 56 and northwest of Dubois; 38°27′59″N 86°49′23″W	Harbison Township	
4	Ferdinand Historic District		November 20, 2024 (#100011043)	Roughly bounded by 1st Street on the south, Missouri Street on the west, 15th Street on the north, and Michigan Street on the east. Main Street includes extensions to the north and south. 38°13′25″N 86°51′44″W	Ferdinand	
5	Gramelspacher-Gutzweiler House	Gramelspacher-Gutzweiler House	February 26, 1983 (#83000027)	11th and Main Sts. 38°23′42″N 86°55′52″W	Jasper	
6	Huntingburg Commercial Historic District	Huntingburg Commercial Historic District	June 21, 2006 (#06000517)	Roughly bounded by Geiger, 4th, Jackson, and Market Sts. 38°17′44″N 86°57′19″W	Huntingburg	
7	Huntingburg Town Hall and Fire Engine House	Huntingburg Town Hall and Fire Engine House	May 12, 1975 (#75000016)	311 Geiger St. 38°17′42″N 86°57′25″W	Huntingburg	
8	Indiana Desk Company		September 2, 2025 (#100012177)	1224 Mill Street; 38°23′47″N 86°55′43″W	Jasper	
9	Jasper Downtown Historic District	Jasper Downtown Historic District	June 12, 2017 (#100001058)	Roughly bounded by 9th, Clay, 3rd, and Mill Sts. 38°23′29″N 86°55′51″W	Jasper	
10	Jasper High School Gymnasium		May 19, 2025 (#100011858)	340 West 6th Street; 38°23′29″N 86°56′02″W	Jasper	
11	Lemmon's Church and Cemetery	Lemmon's Church and Cemetery	June 4, 1992 (#92000674)	Portersville Rd. east of its junction with County Road 750W, west of Portersville; 38°29′28″N 87°02′29″W	Boone Township	
12	Maple Grove Campground		August 24, 2021 (#100006845)	6685 Cty. Rd. 585 West; 38°16′53″N 87°00′45″W	Huntingburg vicinity	
13	John Opel House	John Opel House	October 4, 1984 (#84000009)	St. James St. 38°22′09″N 86°54′23″W	Jasper	
14	St. Ferdinand Parish Historic District	St. Ferdinand Parish Historic District	August 31, 2020 (#100005513)	Roughly bounded by Maryland, 8th, and 10th Sts. and St. Benedict Drive, 38°13′23″N 86°51′38″W	Ferdinand	
15	St. Joseph Catholic Church	St. Joseph Catholic Church	September 30, 1980 (#80000033)	1215 N. Newton St. 38°23′44″N 86°55′56″W	Jasper	
16	Shiloh Meeting House and Cemetery	Shiloh Meeting House and Cemetery	July 29, 1982 (#82000035)	Southeast of Ireland on 150 North Rd. 38°23′53″N 86°58′57″W	Madison Township	
17	Louis H. Sturm Hardware Store	Louis H. Sturm Hardware Store	September 28, 2003 (#03000975)	516 Main St. 38°23′27″N 86°55′49″W	Jasper	
18	Dr. Alois Wollenmann House	Dr. Alois Wollenmann House	March 20, 2013 (#13000083)	1150 Main St. 38°13′31″N 86°51′40″W	Ferdinand	
19	Zoar Public School, Zoar Methodist Church, Zoar Cemetery		December 11, 2023 (#100009589)	8818 West Old State Road 64 and Zoar Church Road; 38°05′07″N 87°26′26″W	Zoar	

== See also ==
- List of National Historic Landmarks in Indiana
- National Register of Historic Places listings in Indiana
- Listings in neighboring counties: Crawford, Daviess, Martin, Orange, Perry, Pike, Spencer, Warrick
- List of Indiana state historical markers in Dubois County
