= Jasper, Indiana =

- City
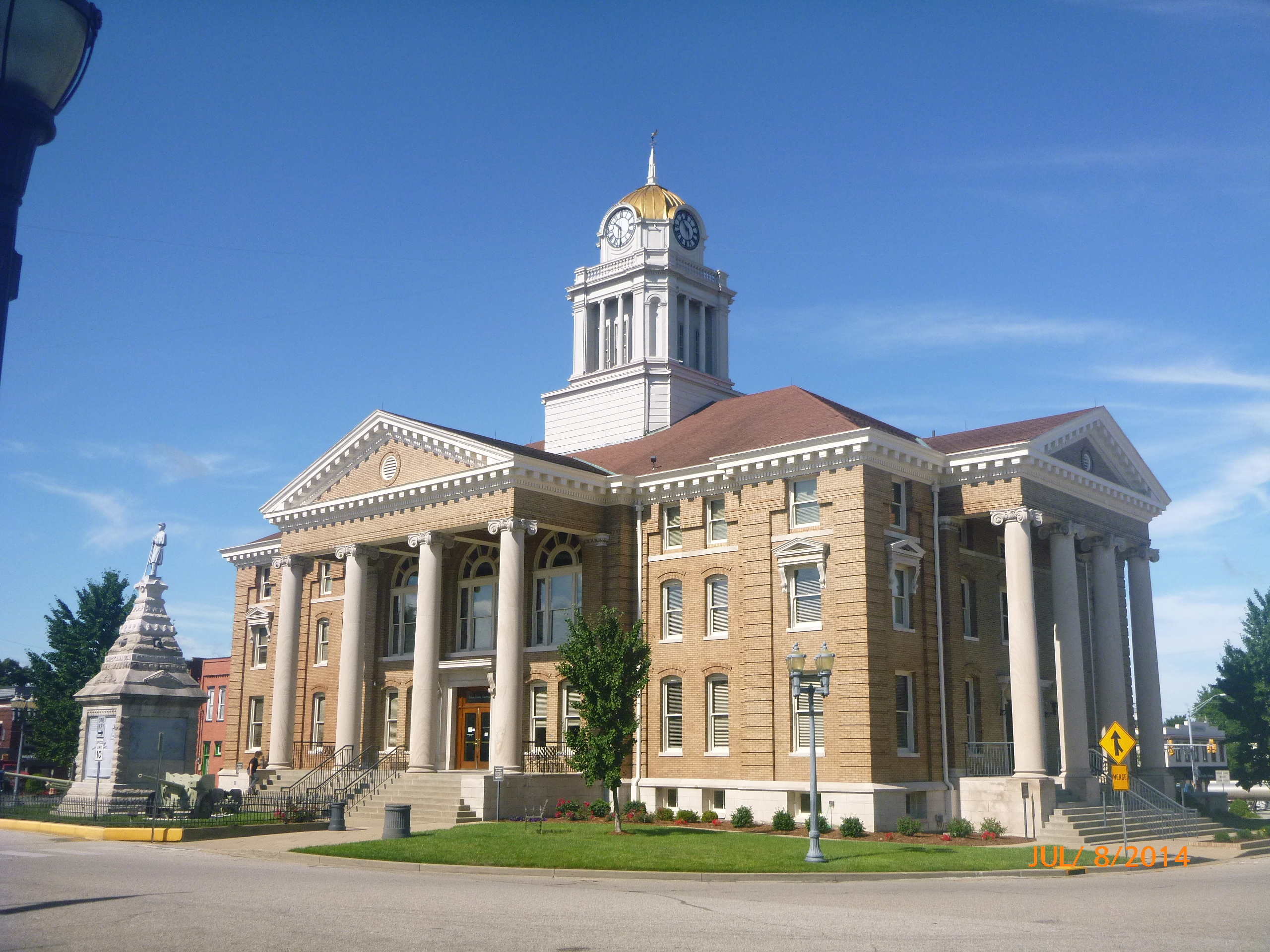
- Dubois County Courthouse

- Flag Seal Logo
- Motto: "The Nation's Wood Capital"
- Location of Jasper in Dubois County, Indiana.
- Coordinates: 38°23′29″N 86°55′51″W
- Country: United States
- State: Indiana
- County: Dubois
- Township: Bainbridge, Boone, Madison
- Founded: 1818

Government
  - Mayor: Ryan Craig (R)

Area
  - Total: 13.34 sq mi (34.55 km^{2})
  - Land: 13.25 sq mi (34.32 km^{2})
  - Water: 0.089 sq mi (0.23 km^{2})
- Elevation: 466 ft (142 m)

Population (2020)
  - Total: 16,703
  - Density: 1,260.5/sq mi (486.68/km^{2})
- Time zone: UTC-5 (Eastern (EST))
  - Summer (DST): UTC-4 (EDT)
- ZIP codes: 47546, 47547, 47549
- Area code: 812 & 930
- FIPS code: 18-37782
- GNIS feature ID: 2395458
- Website: www.jasperindiana.gov

Jasper is a city in and the county seat of Dubois County, Indiana, United States, located along the Patoka River. The population was 16,703 at the 2020 census making it the 48th most populous city in Indiana. On November 4, 2007, Dubois County returned to the Eastern Time Zone, after having moved to the Central Time Zone the previous year. Land use in the area is primarily agricultural. The Indiana Baseball Hall of Fame, which honors players and others associated with the national pastime who were born or lived in Indiana, is located in Jasper.

== History ==
Jasper was founded in 1818. The Enlow family were the first settlers of the town. Jasper was originally going to be named "Eleanor" after the wife of early settler Joseph Enlow, but she opted to suggest a name herself, and named the city after a passage in the Bible (Revelation 21:19).

Jasper was not officially platted until 1830. That year, the community became the new county seat of Dubois County, succeeding Portersville.

The Jasper post office has been in operation since 1832. During the New Deal era, Jessie Hull Mayer won a federal commission to paint a mural as part of the Section of Painting and Sculpture′s projects, later called the Section of Fine Arts, of the Treasury Department. Indiana Farming Scene in Late Autumn depicts a harvest scene on a farmstead, with no indication of the town. In 1975, the painting was featured as part of a film, Art for Main Street: The Indiana Post Office Murals, produced by the Indiana Historical Society.

Jasper was incorporated as a town in 1866, and was incorporated into a city in 1915.

== Geography ==
According to the 2010 census, Jasper has a total area of 13.191 square miles (34.16 km^{2}), of which 13.1 square miles (33.93 km^{2}) (or 99.31%) is land and 0.091 square miles (0.24 km^{2}) (or 0.69%) is water.

The city is located in the townships of Bainbridge, Madison and Boone.

=== Climate ===
The climate in this area is characterized by hot, humid summers and generally cool winters. According to the Köppen Climate Classification system, Jasper, IN has a humid subtropical climate, abbreviated "Cfa" on climate maps.

Climate data for Jasper, IN
Month	Jan	Feb	Mar	Apr	May	Jun	Jul	Aug	Sep	Oct	Nov	Dec	Year
Mean daily maximum °F (°C)	37.1 (2.8)	41.9 (5.5)	53.3 (11.8)	65.0 (18.3)	74.2 (23.4)	83.2 (28.4)	86.5 (30.3)	85.4 (29.7)	79.5 (26.4)	67.9 (19.9)	54.0 (12.2)	40.5 (4.7)	64.0 (17.8)
Mean daily minimum °F (°C)	20.6 (−6.3)	24.0 (−4.4)	32.9 (0.5)	43.3 (6.3)	52.6 (11.4)	62.4 (16.9)	65.6 (18.7)	63.2 (17.3)	55.0 (12.8)	43.9 (6.6)	34.5 (1.4)	24.0 (−4.4)	43.5 (6.4)
Average precipitation inches (mm)	2.8 (71)	2.5 (64)	3.6 (91)	4.1 (100)	5.1 (130)	4.3 (110)	4.3 (110)	3.1 (79)	3.2 (81)	3.5 (89)	4.1 (100)	3.3 (84)	43.9 (1,109)
Average snowfall inches (cm)	5 (13)	3 (7.6)	2 (5.1)	0 (0)	0 (0)	0 (0)	0 (0)	0 (0)	0 (0)	0 (0)	0 (0)	3 (7.6)	13 (33.3)
Average precipitation days	8	8	10	10	11	10	8	7	7	8	9	9	105
Average snowy days	3	2	1	0	0	0	0	0	0	0	0	2	8
Source: bestplaces.net

== Demographics ==
Historical population
Census	Pop.	Note	%±
1870	547		—
1880	1,040		90.1%
1890	1,281		23.2%
1900	1,863		45.4%
1910	2,196		17.9%
1920	2,539		15.6%
1930	3,905		53.8%
1940	5,041		29.1%
1950	5,215		3.5%
1960	6,737		29.2%
1970	8,641		28.3%
1980	9,097		5.3%
1990	10,030		10.3%
2000	12,100		20.6%
2010	15,038		24.3%
2020	16,703		11.1%
Source: US Census Bureau

Jasper is the principal city of the Jasper Micropolitan Statistical Area, a micropolitan area that covers Dubois and Pike counties and had a combined population of 54,734 at the 2010 census.

=== 2020 census ===
As of the 2020 census, Jasper had a population of 16,703. The median age was 39.6 years. 23.5% of residents were under the age of 18 and 18.6% of residents were 65 years of age or older. For every 100 females there were 97.5 males, and for every 100 females age 18 and over there were 94.8 males age 18 and over.

98.2% of residents lived in urban areas, while 1.8% lived in rural areas.

There were 6,797 households in Jasper, of which 29.7% had children under the age of 18 living in them. Of all households, 49.7% were married-couple households, 18.2% were households with a male householder and no spouse or partner present, and 25.5% were households with a female householder and no spouse or partner present. About 30.8% of all households were made up of individuals and 13.0% had someone living alone who was 65 years of age or older.

There were 7,173 housing units, of which 5.2% were vacant. The homeowner vacancy rate was 1.0% and the rental vacancy rate was 7.8%.

Racial composition as of the 2020 census
Race	Number	Percent
White	14,361	86.0%
Black or African American	121	0.7%
American Indian and Alaska Native	66	0.4%
Asian	172	1.0%
Native Hawaiian and Other Pacific Islander	3	0.0%
Some other race	1,160	6.9%
Two or more races	820	4.9%
Hispanic or Latino (of any race)	2,001	12.0%

=== 2010 census ===
As of the census of 2010, the population of Jasper was 15,038 and there were 5,994 households. The gender makeup of the city is 49.2% male and 50.8% female.

==== Ethnicities ====
The racial makeup of the city was:

- 93.6% white
- 7.7% Hispanic (of any race)
- 0.4% African American
- 0.9% Asian
- 0.2% Native American
- 4.0% from other races
- 0.9% from two or more races.

==== Age ====
Of the total Jasper population:

- 14.0% were 0–9
- 12.9% were 10–19
- 12.1% were 20–29
- 11.9% were 30–39
- 14.4% were 40–49
- 13.6% were 50–59
- 9.1% were 60–69
- 6.1% were 70–79
- 5.4% were 80 or older
- Median age was 39.3 years. For males it was 36.9 years and for females, 41.6 years.

==== Income ====
- Overall median household income in Jasper is $53,968
- Median income for a family is $65,903
- Males had a median income of $37,432
- Females had a median income of $32,218
- The per capita income for the city is $28,540
- About 5.7% of families and 7.6% of the population are below the poverty line, including 8.2% of those under age 18 and 3.9% of those age 65 and over.

== Economy ==
Jasper is a regional center in Southwestern Indiana, with German Catholic ancestral roots. Jasper has been called the "Wood Capital of the World", with furniture companies such as Jasper Group, Kimball International, and Masterbrand Cabinets located in the city. Also located in Jasper are Southern Indiana Education Center, Jasper Engines and Transmissions, and a satellite campus of Vincennes University.

In 2022, Jasper won the annual Strong Towns "Strongest Town" competition.

The largest industry sectors by employment in Jasper are manufacturing, retail, and health care and social services.

== Arts and culture ==
Jasper has the only municipally supported Arts Council in Indiana; it is part of city government. The City of Jasper and the Jasper Community Arts Commission won the Governor's Arts Award in 1987 and 2007.

The Jasper Strassenfest is a four-day event held annually during the first weekend in August. The "Fest" is a celebration between Jasper and its German sister-city Pfaffenweiler, a village in southwest Germany, and some citizens of Pfaffenweiler travel to Jasper around this time of year. The street festival encompasses the city square, and features food stands, rides, a beer garden, parade, fireworks, golf tournament, beauty pageant (Miss Strassenfest), fishing tournament, and a network of German "Polka Masses" at the three Roman Catholic parishes. On average, over 1,300 lb (590 kg) of bratwurst are consumed during the event.

In 2021, the Thyen-Clark Cultural Center and public lending library opened.

=== Sites listed on National Register of Historic Places ===
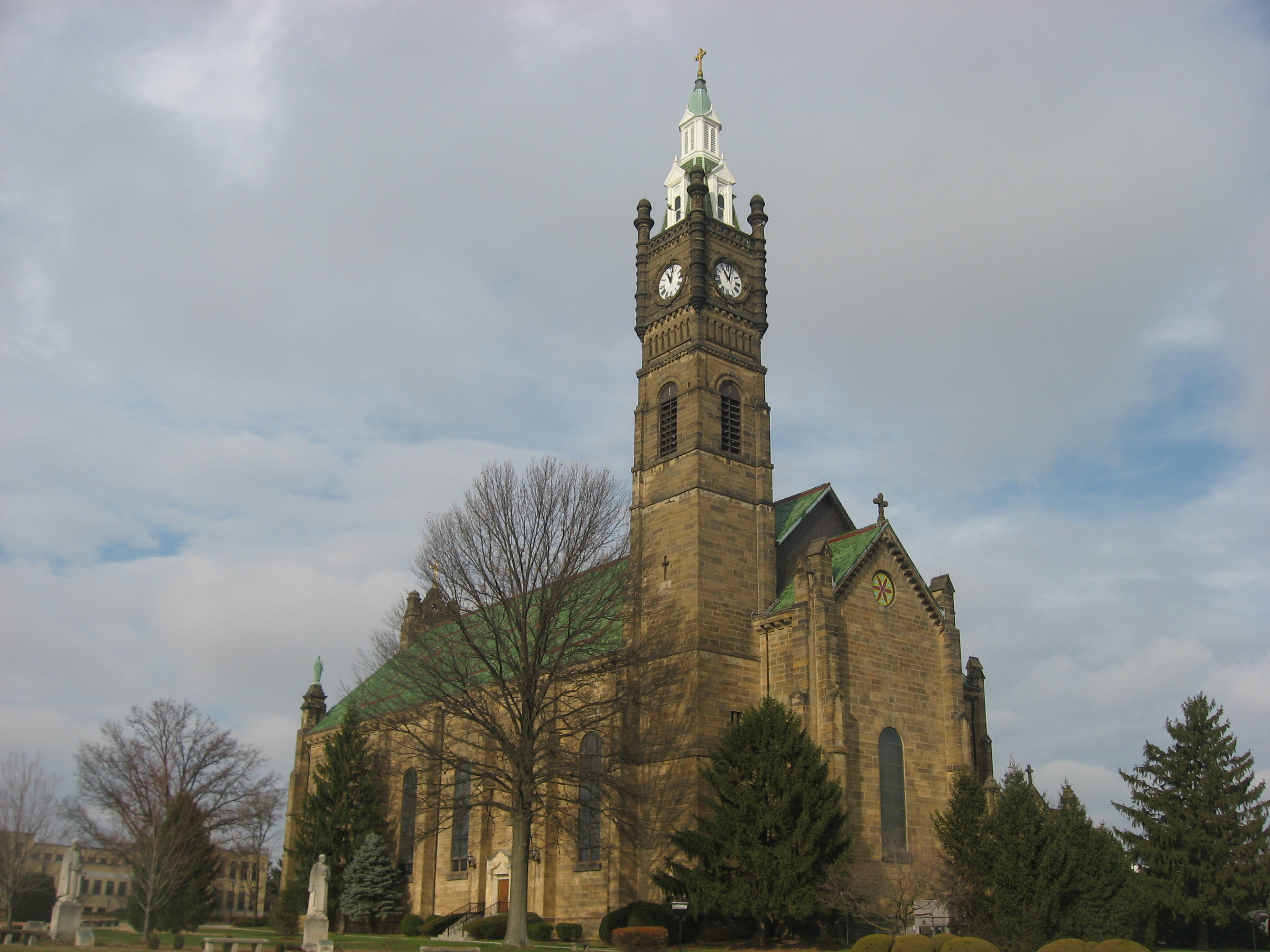
St. Joseph Catholic Church

Sites in Jasper listed on the National Register of Historic Places listings in Dubois County, Indiana include:

- Dubois County Courthouse
- Gramelspacher-Gutzweiler House
- John Opel House
- St. Joseph Catholic Church
- Louis H. Sturm Hardware Store

== Parks and recreation ==
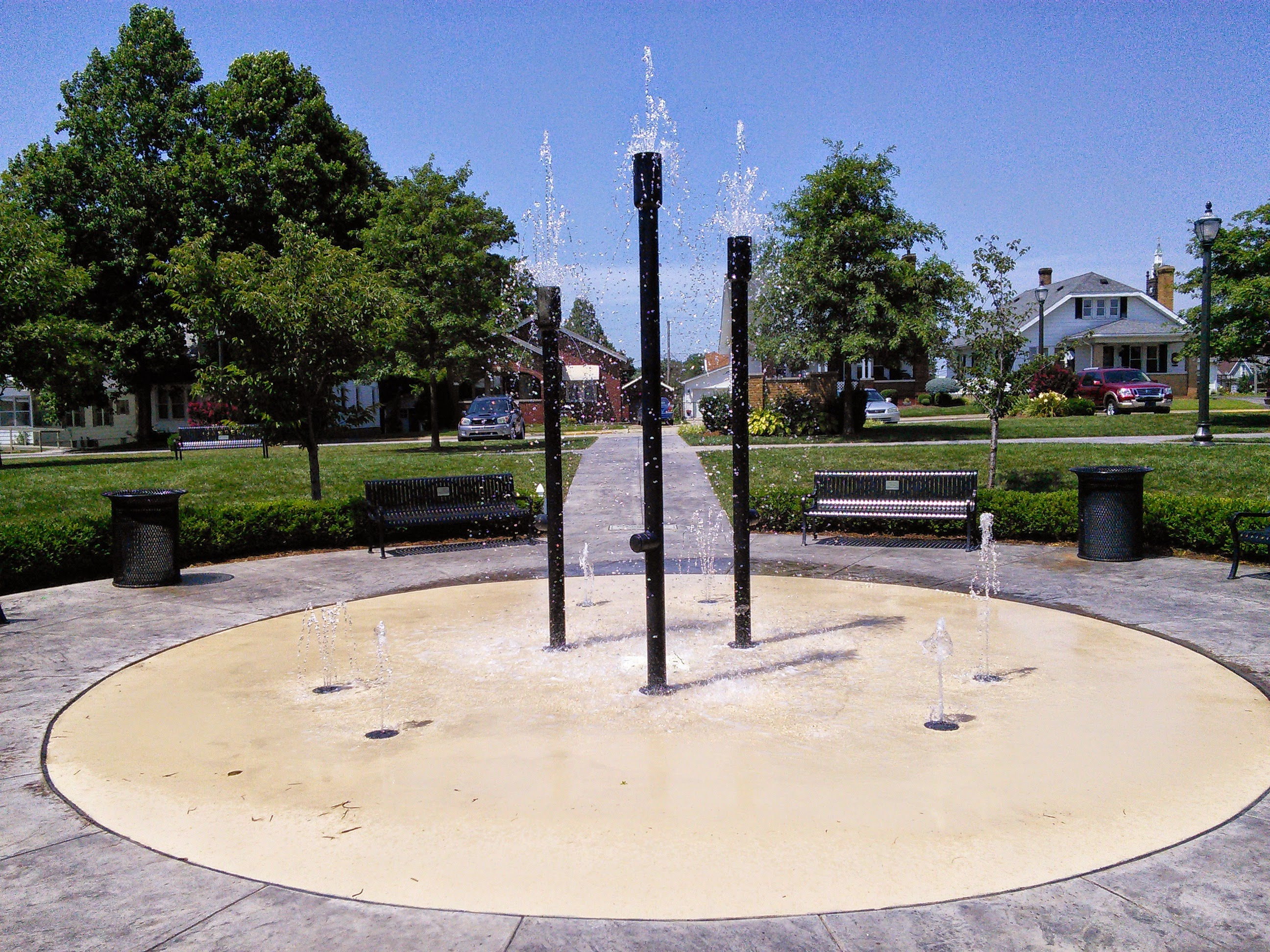
Splash fountain at Central Green Park

Jasper has 18 city parks covering 355 acres (144 ha).

== Government ==
The following persons have held the office of mayor of Jasper, Indiana.

Mayor	Term Began	Term Ended	Political Party
George P. Wagner	July 1915	Dec 1934	Democrat
John Lorey	Jan 1935	July 1937	Democrat
Roman Kunkel	Aug 1937	Dec 1942	Democrat
Charles Bartley	Jan 1943	Aug 1945	Democrat
Herbert Thyen	Sept 1945	Dec 1951	Democrat
Edward J. Lorey	Jan 1952	Dec 1959	Democrat
Edwin B. Knies	Jan 1960	Aug 1963	Democrat
Francis J. Sermersheim	Sept 1963	Dec 1963	Democrat
Jack E. Newton	Jan 1964	Dec 1971	Republican
Robert E. Parker	Jan 1972	Dec 1979	N/A
Jerome "Chick" Alles	Jan 1980	Dec 1991	Democrat
William J. Schmitt	Jan 1992	Dec 2011	Democrat
Terry Seitz	Jan 2012	Dec 2018	Republican
Dean Vonderheide	Jan 2019	March 2026	Republican
Ryan Craig	April 2026	N/A	Republican

== Education ==
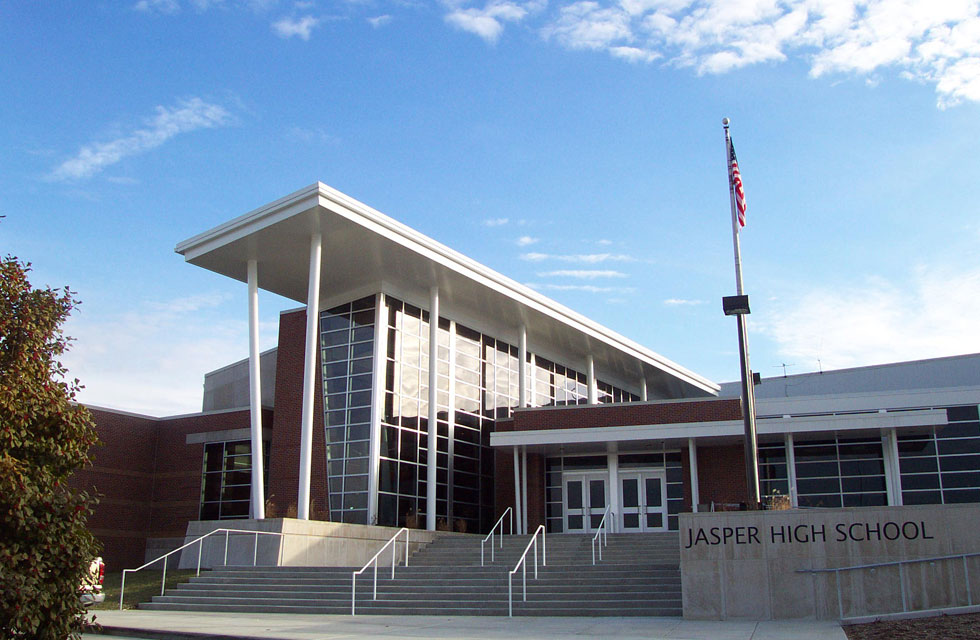
Jasper High School

In 1970, the school system of Ireland, Indiana, was consolidated into that of the Greater Jasper Consolidated Schools.

Schools in Jasper include:

- Jasper High School (public, grades 9 to 12)
- Jasper Middle School (public 6 to 8)
- Ireland Elementary School (public pre-K to 5)
- Jasper Elementary School (public pre-K to 5)
- Holy Trinity Catholic School
- West Campus at St. Mary's Ireland (private pre-K)
- Central Campus at Precious Blood (private pre K to 2)
- East Campus at Holy Family (private 3 to 8)
- Vincennes University (Jasper Campus)

== Media ==
=== Newspapers ===
- The American Eagle, Jasper's first newspaper, operated from 1846 to 1848.
- The Democrat (1857), the Times (1865), and another Times (1879–1891).
- The Jasper Weekly Courier, a Democratic newspaper, served Dubois County from 1858 to 1921.
- The Dubois County Herald, founded in 1895, currently circulates about 10,000 copies per day to residents of Dubois, Spencer, and Pike counties. The Herald is one of only 300 independently owned newspapers in the United States.
- The Jasper News Journal is a free newspaper.

=== Radio ===
The following stations are licensed in the city of Jasper

- 91.7 FM WJPR
- 91.7 FM WJWS "The Curve"
- 104.7 FM WITZ-FM
- 990 AM WITZ-AM

== Infrastructure ==
=== Highways ===
- U.S. Route 231
- Indiana State Road 164
- Indiana State Road 162
- Indiana State Road 56

== Notable people ==
- Mike Braun, U.S. senator for Indiana and governor of Indiana
- Daniel M. Buechlein, former Roman Catholic Archbishop of Indianapolis
- Brad Ellsworth, former member of the U.S. House of Representatives
- Spike Gehlhausen, Indy car driver
- Arnold Habig, founder of Kimball International
- Paul Hoffman, Purdue All-American, NBA Rookie of the Year, NBA Champion
- Shane Lindauer, member of the Indiana House of Representatives
- Matt Mauck, National Football League quarterback; led the LSU Tigers to the 2003 national championship
- Mark Messmer, U.S. representative for Indiana
- Frank W. Milburn, World War II and Korean War general
- Richard M. Milburn, Indiana Attorney General
- Edith Pfau, artist
- Scott Rolen, Major League Baseball player
- Ralph K. Rottet, Lieutenant general, U.S. Marine Corps
- William J. Schroeder, longest lived person on a Jarvik-7
- Bernard V. Vonderschmitt, most noted as a co-founder of leading FPGA producer Xilinx.
- Wilfrid Worland, Washington, D.C.–area architect

== In popular culture ==
The fictional town of Orson, Indiana, from the TV series The Middle, is based on Jasper.

== Sister cities ==
Jasper participates in the sister cities program, as designated by Sister Cities International, and is a sister city of Pfaffenweiler, Baden-Württemberg, Germany.

== See also ==
- List of public art in Jasper, Indiana
