= Lemmon's Presbyterian Church =

Historic church in Indiana, United States

- Lemmon's Church and Cemetery
- U.S. National Register of Historic Places
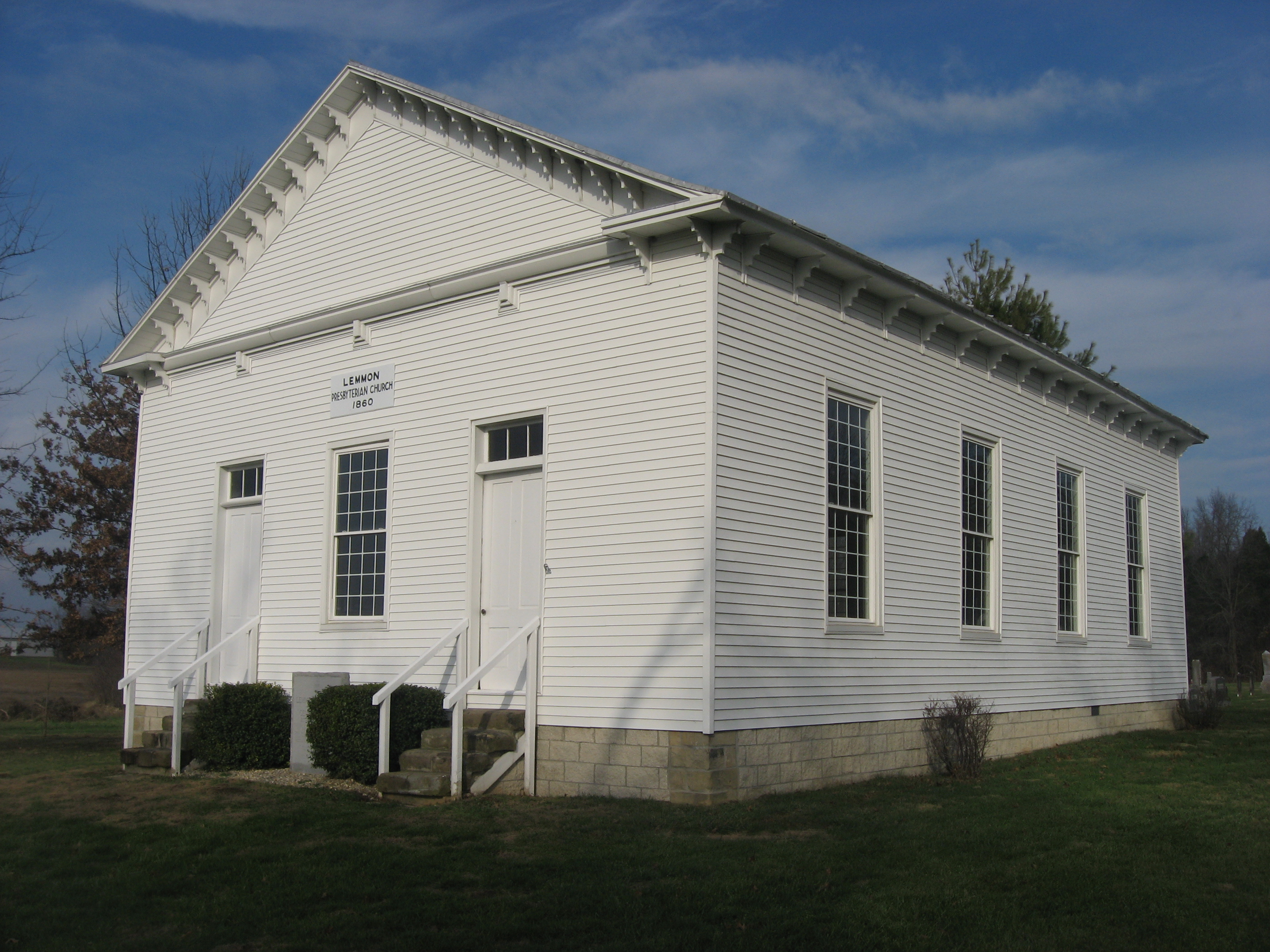

- Location within Indiana Location within the United States
- Location: Portersville Rd. east of its junction with County Road 750W, west of Portersville, Boone Township, Dubois County, Indiana
- Coordinates: 38°29′28″N 87°2′29″W
- Area: 3 acres (1.2 ha)
- Built: 1860
- Built by: Baugh, Samuel
- Architectural style: Greek Revival
- NRHP reference No.: 92000674
- Added to NRHP: June 4, 1992

Lemmon's Presbyterian Church is a historic Presbyterian church and cemetery located near Portersville in Boone Township, Dubois County, Indiana. The church was built in 1860, and is a one-story, rectangular frame building with Greek Revival style design elements. The one-room building has a gable front roof and rests on a sandstone pier foundation. Also on the property is a contributing cemetery. The church was renovated in 1992.

The church and cemetery were added to the National Register of Historic Places in 1992 as Lemmon's Church and Cemetery.

== Gallery ==
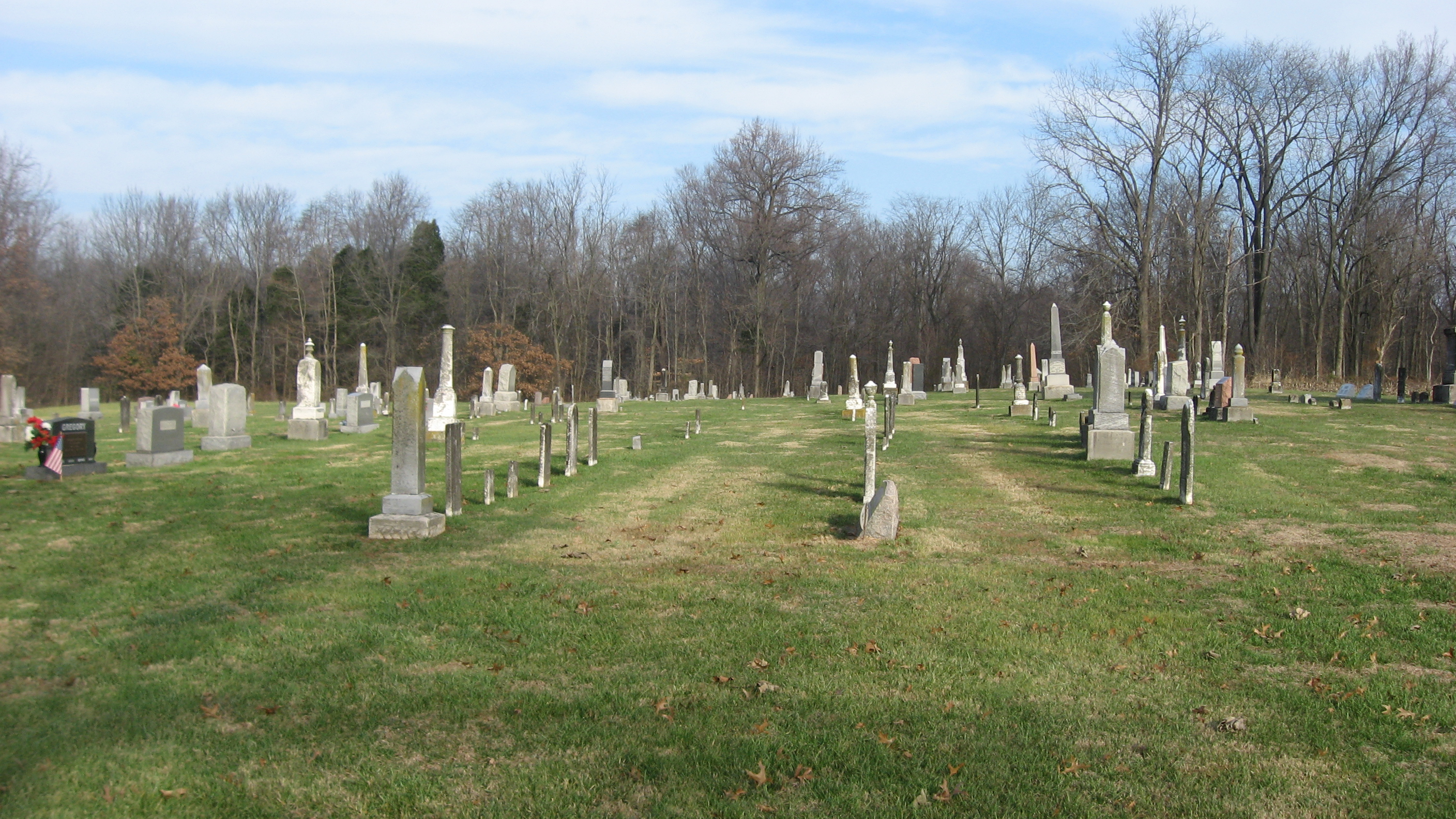
View of the cemetery

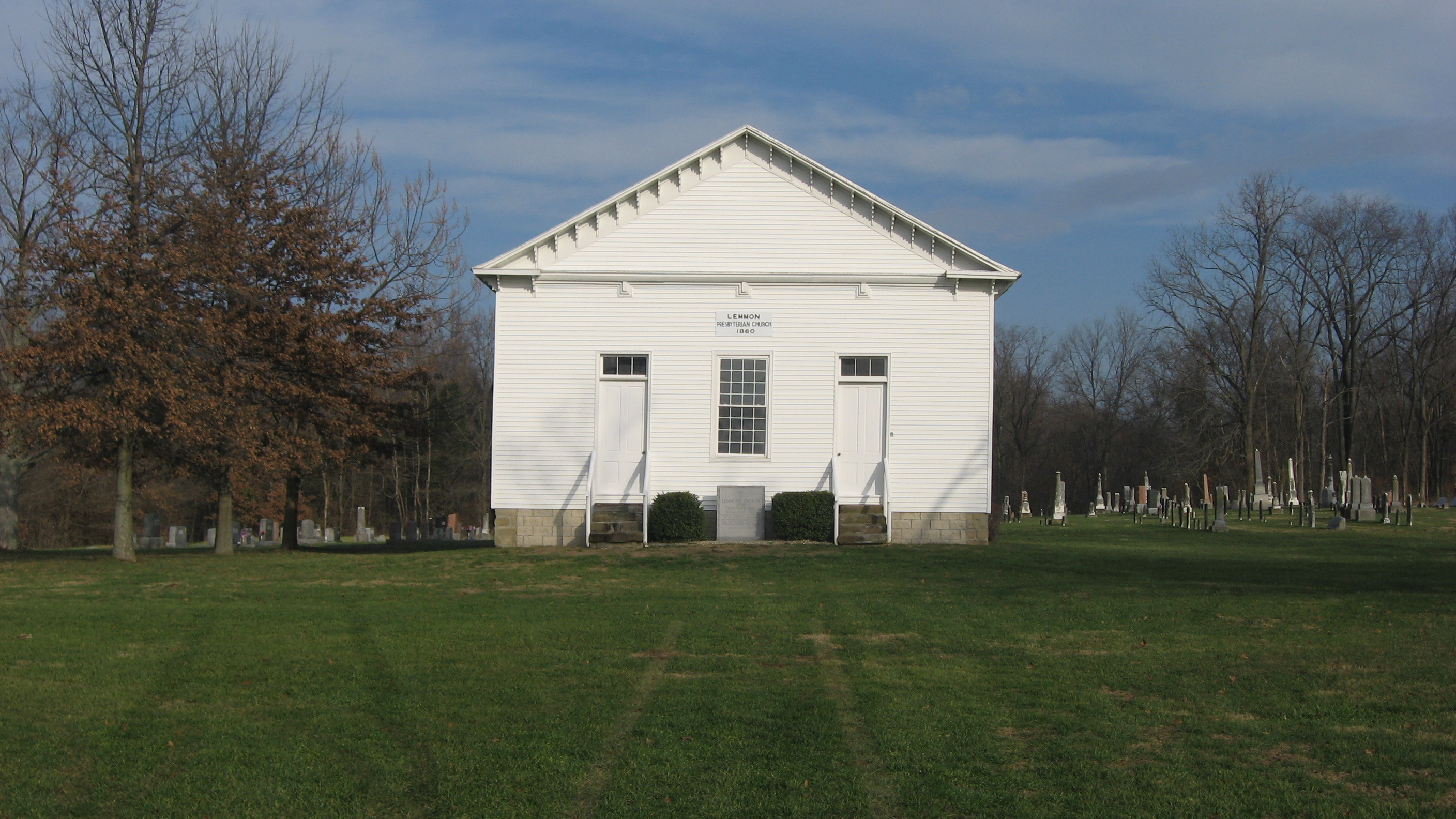
Front view

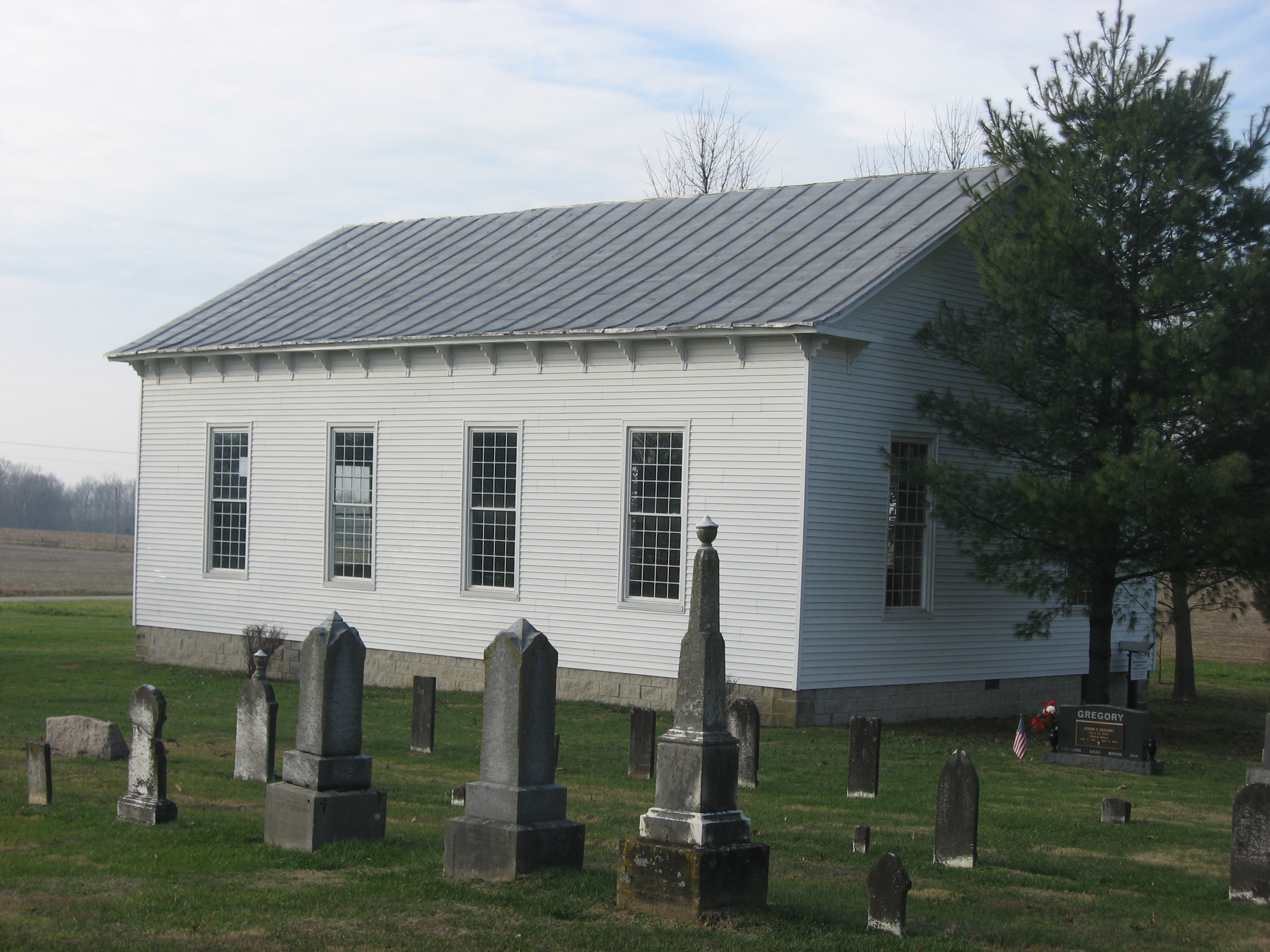
Rear view
