= List of Indiana state historical markers in Dubois County =

This is a list of the Indiana state historical markers in Dubois County.

This is intended to be a complete list of the official state historical markers placed in Dubois County, Indiana, United States by the Indiana Historical Bureau. The locations of the historical markers and their latitude and longitude coordinates are included below when available, along with their names, years of placement, and topics as recorded by the Historical Bureau. There are 2 historical markers located in Dubois County.

== Historical markers ==
Marker title	Image	Year placed	Location	Topics
Buckingham's Base Line		2018	5891 N. US 231, Jasper 38°27′59″N 86°55′02″W	Early Settlement & Exploration; American Indian
State Police Jasper Post		2021	Indiana State Police Post 34, 2209 Newton Street, Jasper 38°24′29″N 86°56′17″W	Government Institution, Law, Buildings & Architecture

== See also ==
- List of Indiana state historical markers
