= List of public art in Jasper, Indiana =

This is a list of public art in Jasper, Indiana.

This list applies only to works of public art accessible in an outdoor public space. For example, this does not include artwork visible inside a museum.

Title	Artist	Year	Location/GPS Coordinates	Material	Dimensions	Owner	Image
Crucifixion	Unknown	1952	St. Joseph Cemetery	Marble	Sculpture: approx. 10 ft. x 82 in. x 32 in.	St. Joseph Parish	
Deliverance Cross	Otto Blessinger & Harry Melchior	1932	St. Joseph Church	Metal & Limestone	Sculpture: approx. 10 ft. x 39 in. x 32 in.	St. Joseph Church	
Dubois County Soldiers' and Sailors' Monument	Michael Durlauf	1894	Courthouse Square	Bronze	Sculpture: approx. 6 x 3 x 2 ft.	Dubois County Commissioners	
Endarchy	David L. Rodgers	1982	Old National Bank	Limestone	Sculpture: approx. 89 x 156 x 163 in.	Old National Bank	
Founding Fathers	Elmer Harland Daniels	1944	St. Joseph Church	Limestone	3 figures. Each sculpture: approx. 8 ft. x 3 ft. x 33 in.	St. Joseph Church	
Gateway to the Heart	Bernard Hagedorn	1988	Bill Schroeder Sports Complex	Stainless steel	Sculpture: approx. 13 1/2 x 11 x 3 ft.	Bill Schroeder Sports Complex	
Maternal Heart of Mary	Daprato Statuary Company	1951	Little Company of Mary	Marble	Sculpture: approx. 6 ft. x 33 in. x 18 in.	Memorial Hospital	
St. Joseph Shrine	Phillip Ottavi	1950s	13th & Bartley	Concrete	St. Joseph: approx. 6 x 2 x 2 1/2 ft.	Providence Home	
St. Joseph, St. Peter, St. Paul,	Unknown	1907	St. Joseph Church	Bronze	3 units. St. Peter: approx. 7 1/2 x 2 3/4 x 2 1/2 ft.; St. Joseph: approx. 7 1/4 x 2 3/4 x 2 1/4 ft.; St. Paul: approx. 8 x 3 1/2 x 3 ft.	St. Joseph Church	
Sacred Heart of Jesus	Unknown	1973	Providence Home	Concrete	Approx. 6 ft. x 45 in. x 18 in.	Providence Home	
