= St. Joseph's Catholic Church (Jasper, Indiana) =

Historic church in Indiana, United States

- St. Joseph Catholic Church
- U.S. National Register of Historic Places
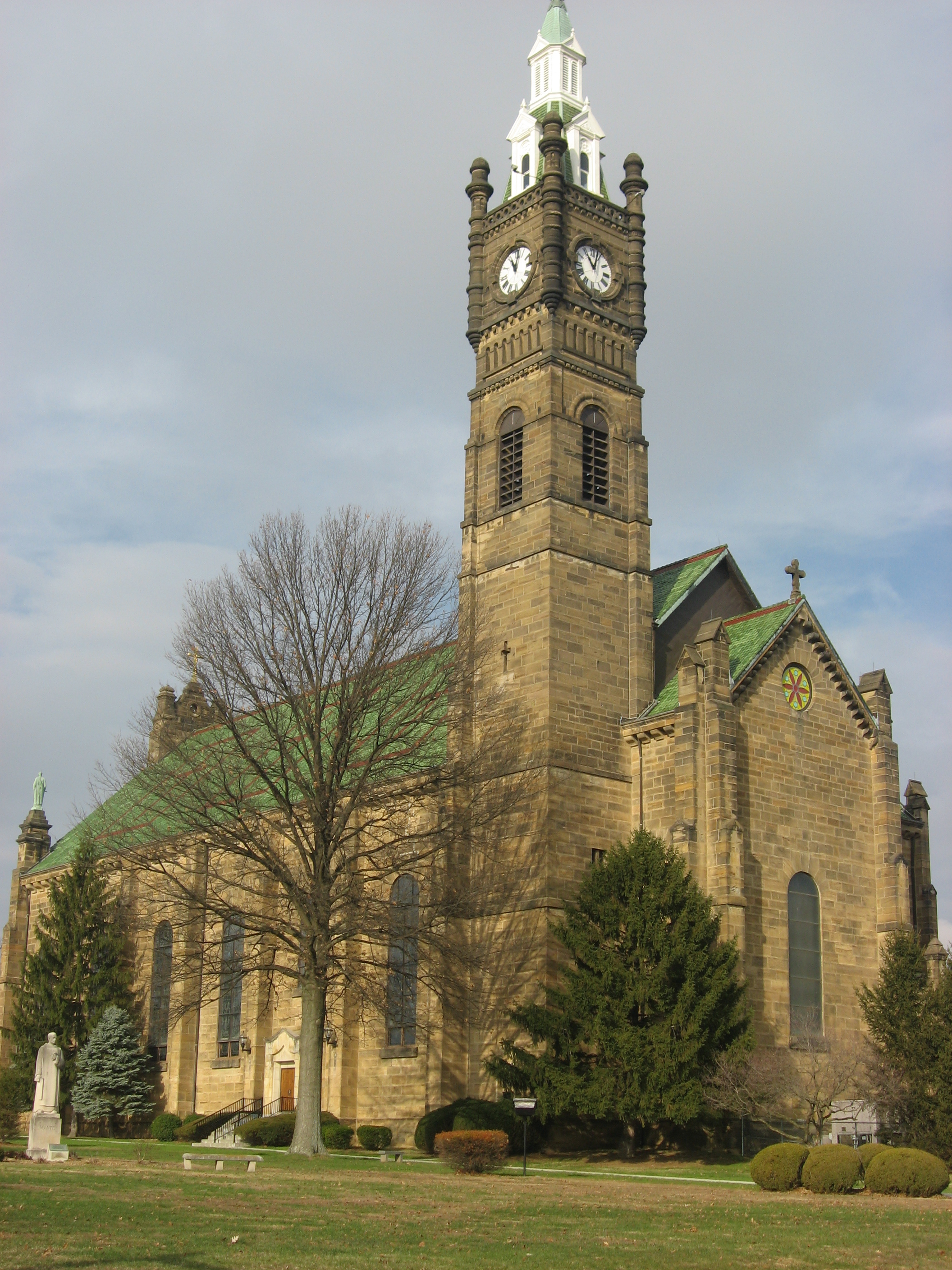

- Location within Indiana Location within the United States
- Location: 1215 N. Newton St., Jasper, Indiana
- Coordinates: 38°23′44″N 86°55′56″W
- Area: less than one acre
- Built: 1867-1880
- Architect: Rev. Fidelis Maute
- Architectural style: Romanesque
- NRHP reference No.: 80000033
- Added to NRHP: September 30, 1980

St. Joseph Catholic Church is a parish of the Roman Catholic Church in Jasper, Indiana, in the Diocese of Evansville. It is noted for its historic church located at 1215 N. Newton Street.

The community was founded in 1837 by Fr. Joseph Kundek, a missionary priest from Croatia, and met in a log cabin before moving to a brick structure in 1841. The current church was built through the efforts of Fr. Fidelis Maute, OSB, who served as architect and builder as well as pastor. Work began in 1867 and was completed in 1880, and the building was consecrated in 1888.

== Architecture ==
The church is a large, Romanesque Revival style, solid sandstone block building. It features a large stone bell tower and steeple measuring 235 feet high. It was added to the National Register of Historic Places in 1980.

== Gallery ==
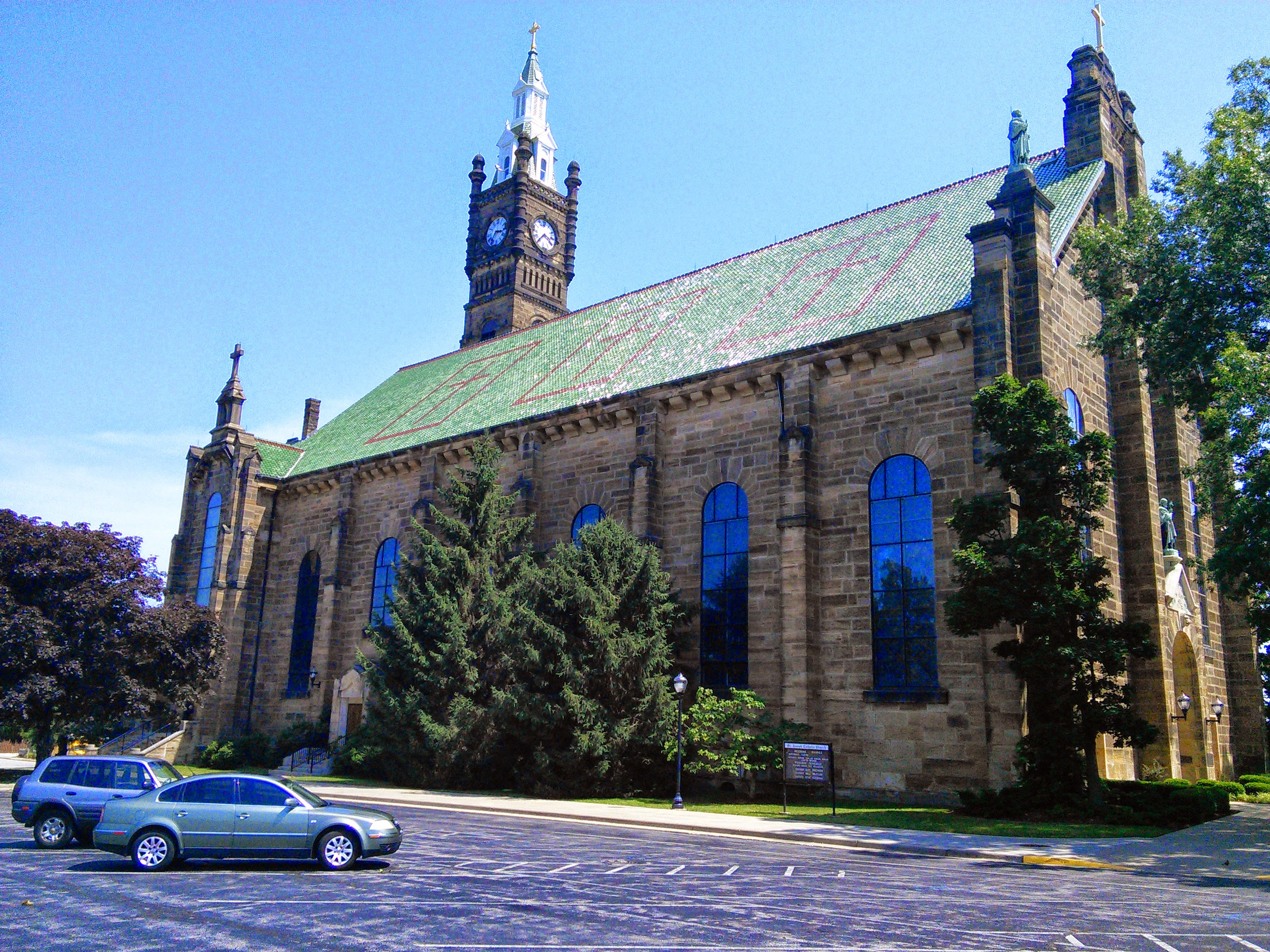
Side view of the church

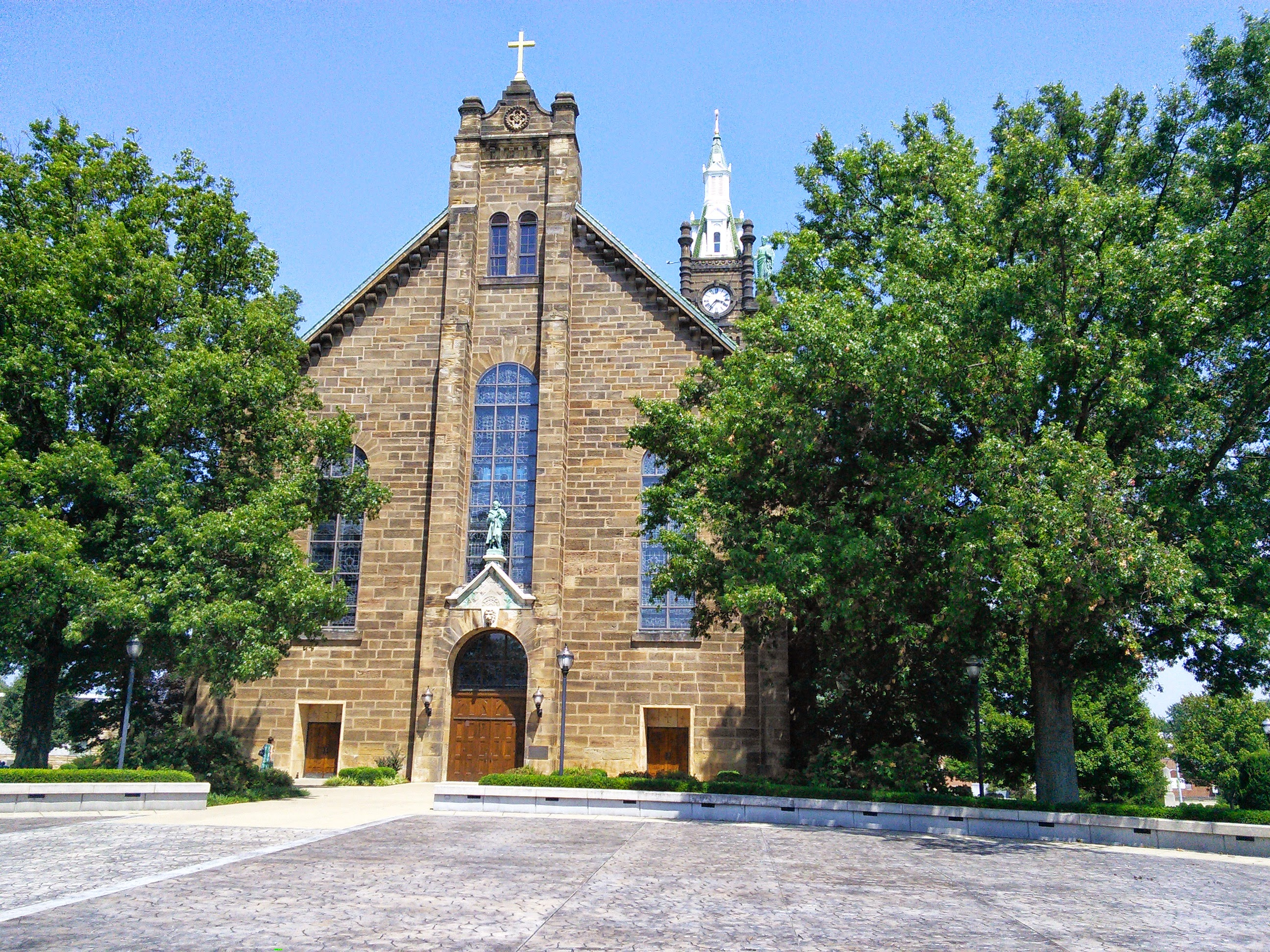
Back view of the church

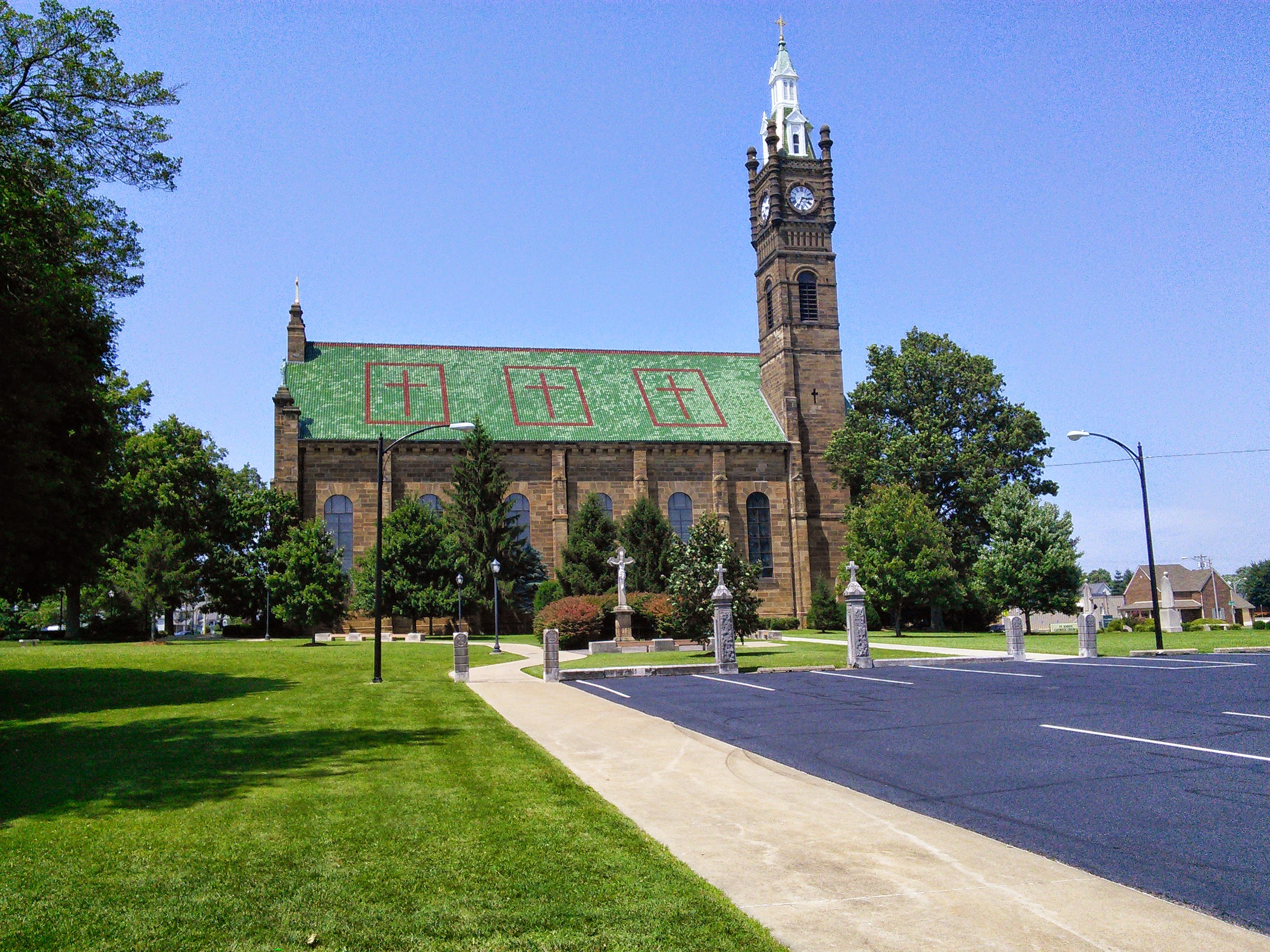
Front view of the church

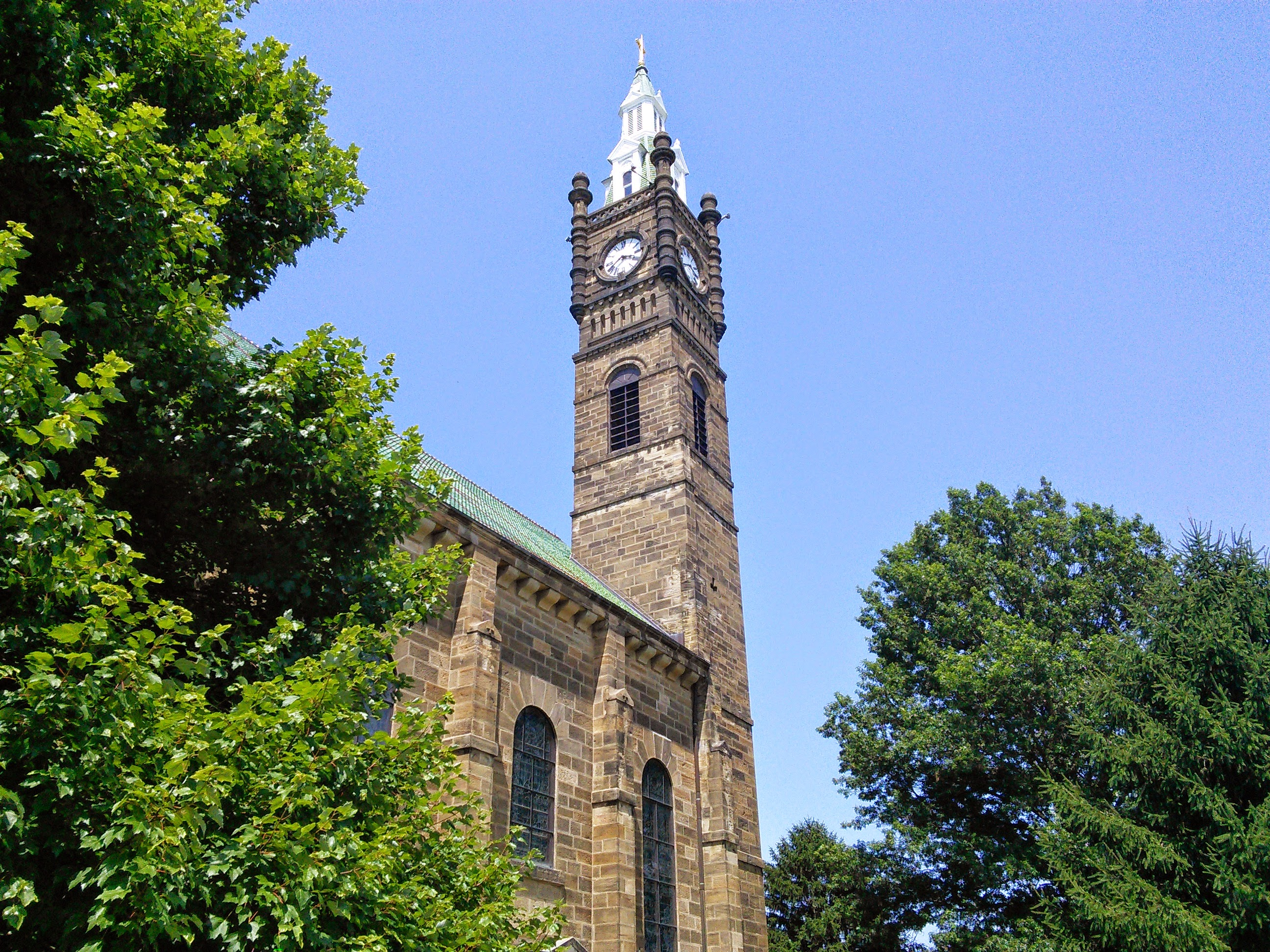
View of the bell tower

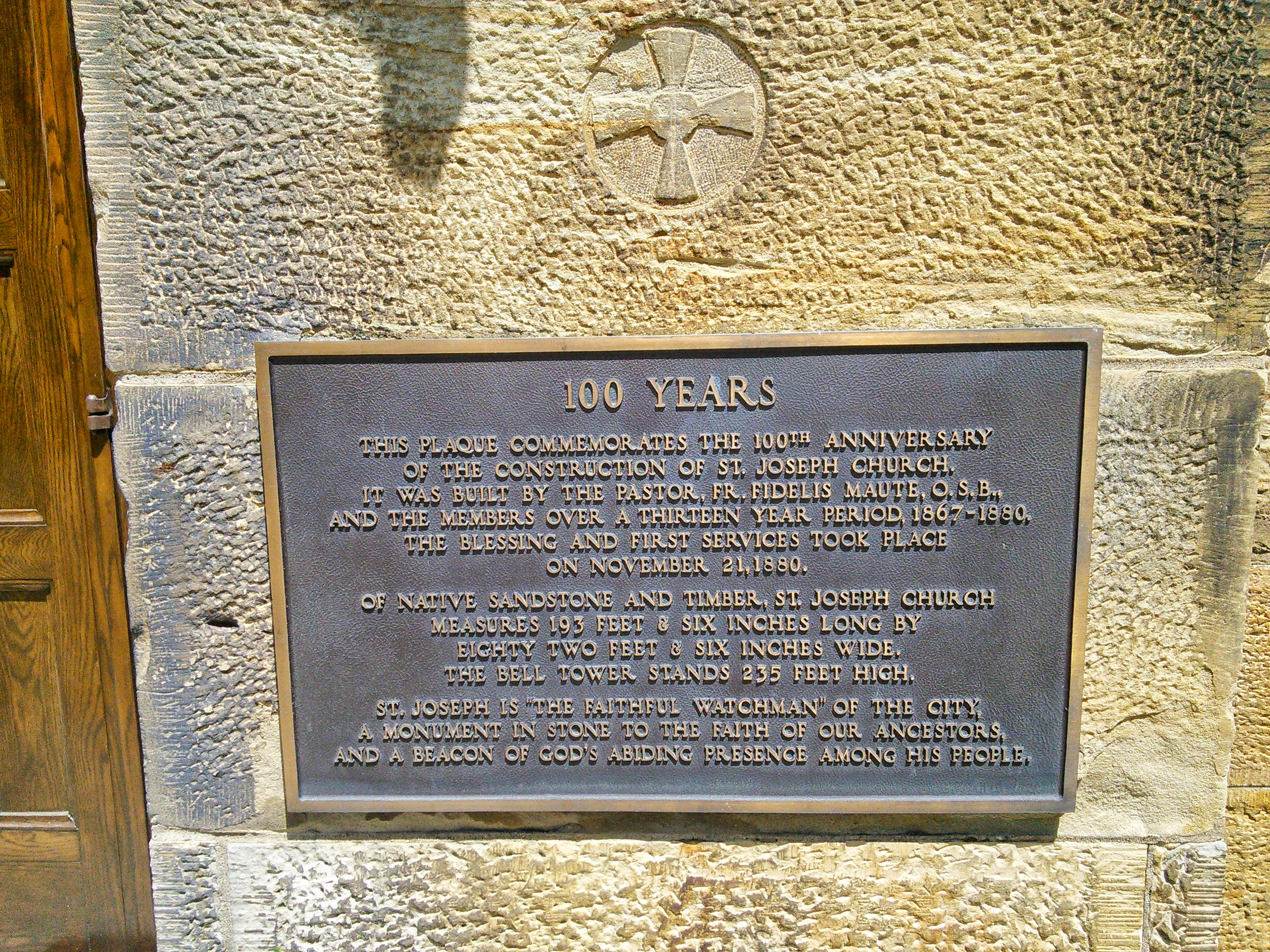
A memorial plaque
