= John Opel House =

Historic house in Indiana, United States

- U.S. National Register of Historic Places
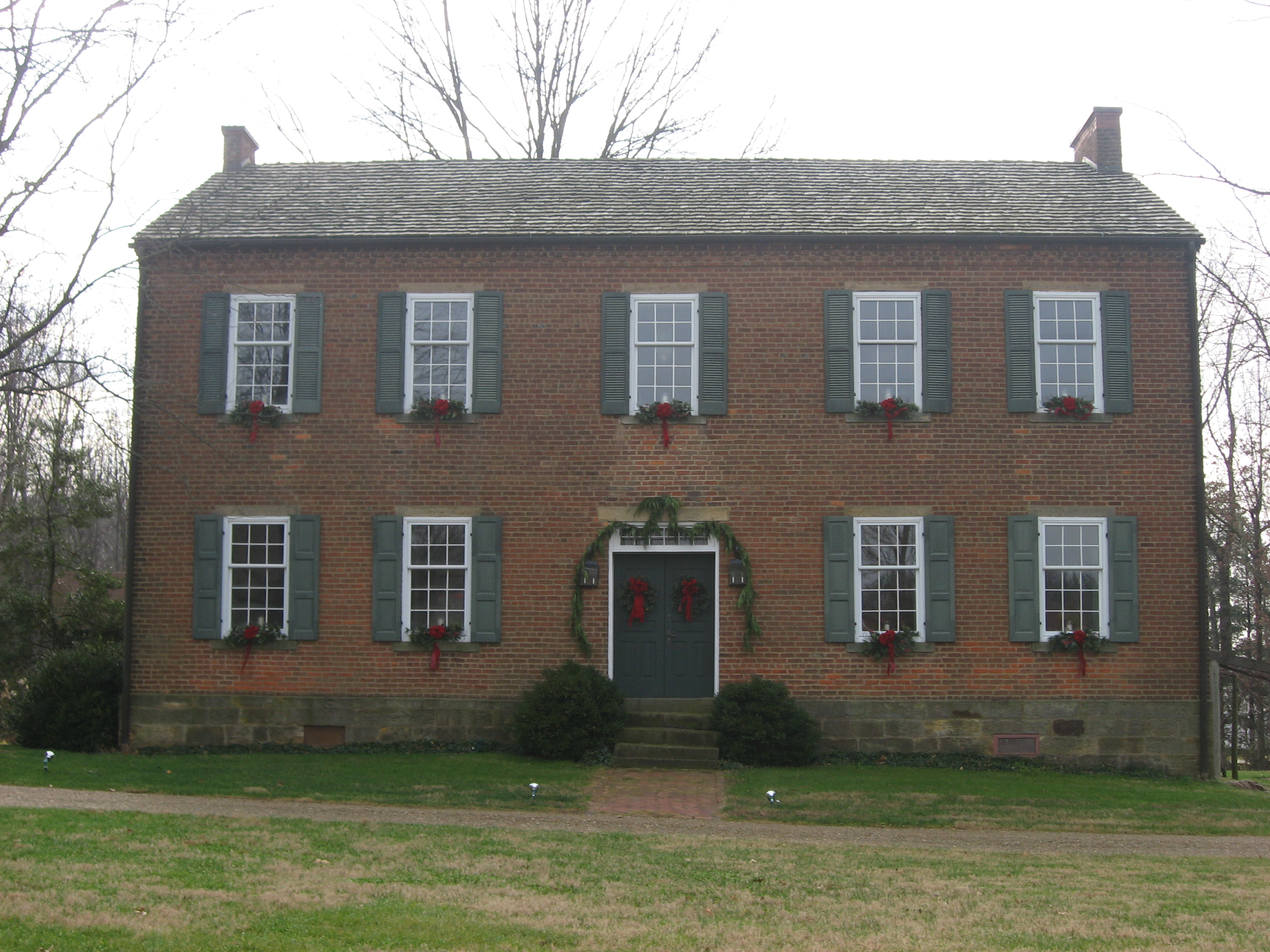
- John Opel House, December 2011

- Location within Indiana Location within the United States
- Location: St. James St., Jasper, Indiana
- Coordinates: 38°22′9″N 86°54′23″W
- Area: less than one acre
- Built: c. 1850
- Architectural style: Federal
- NRHP reference No.: 84000009
- Added to NRHP: October 4, 1984

John Opel House, also known as the Green Tree Hotel and Bochelman House, is a historic home located at Jasper, Indiana. It was built about 1850, and is a 2 1/2-story, five bay by three bay, Federal style brick dwelling. It rests on a stone foundation, has a gable roof, and interior end chimneys. It features a saw-tooth cornice and barrel-vaulted wine cellar.

It was added to the National Register of Historic Places in 1984.
