= Dr. Alois Wollenmann House =

Historic house in Indiana, United States

- U.S. National Register of Historic Places
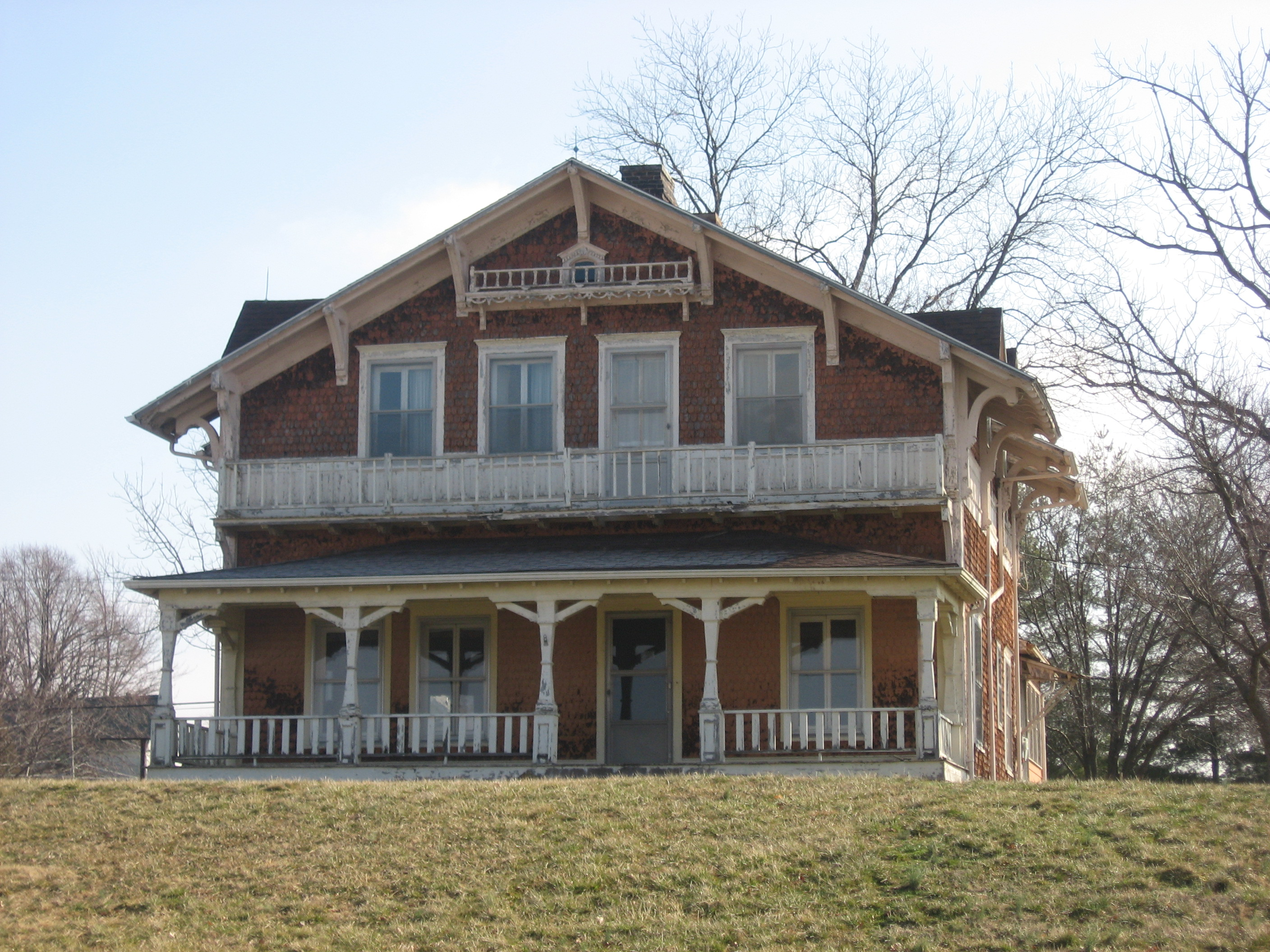
- Dr. Alois Wollenmann House, February 2013

- Location within Indiana Location within the United States
- Location: 1150 Main St., Ferdinand, Indiana
- Coordinates: 38°13′31″N 86°51′40″W
- Area: less than one acre
- Built: 1903
- Architect: Keith, Walter Jewett
- Architectural style: Swiss cottage, Craftsman
- NRHP reference No.: 13000083
- Added to NRHP: March 20, 2013

Dr. Alois Wollenmann House is a historic home located at Ferdinand, Indiana. It was built in 1903, and is a two-story, roughly square, frame Swiss Cottage style dwelling. It has American Craftsman detailing and features decorative shingles and turned balustrades and brackets. It has a one-story rear addition housing a kitchen and sunroom.

It was added to the National Register of Historic Places in 2013.
