= Monastery Immaculate Conception =

Historic district in Indiana, United States

- Convent Immaculate Conception Historic District
- U.S. National Register of Historic Places
- U.S. Historic district
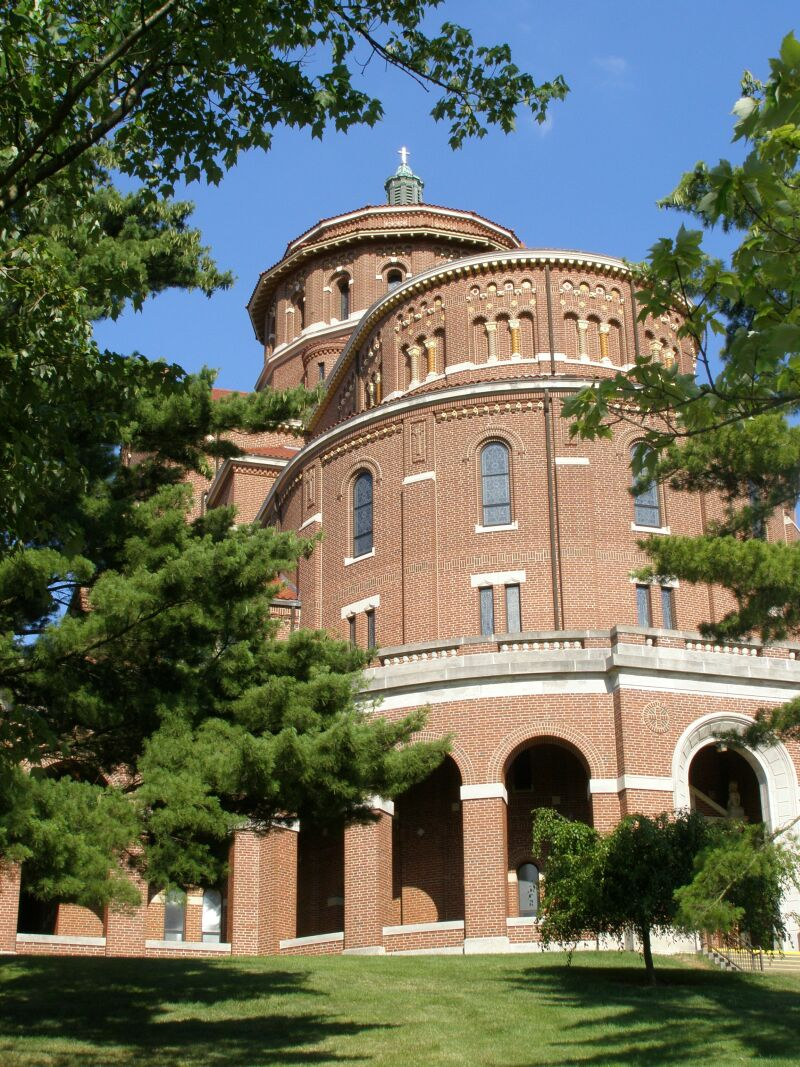
- Monastery of Immaculate Conception, June 2008

- Location within Indiana Location within the United States
- Location: 802 E. 10th St., Ferdinand, Indiana
- Coordinates: 38°13′23″N 86°51′08″W
- Area: 190 acres (77 ha)
- Built: 1883-1887, 1915
- Architects: Klutho, Victor
- Architectural style: Romanesque
- NRHP reference No.: 83000122
- Added to NRHP: July 13, 1983

The Monastery Immaculate Conception is a monastery in Ferdinand, Indiana. It is home to one of the largest communities of Benedictine women in the United States. It is located approximately fifteen minutes from St. Meinrad Archabbey.

== Convent of the Immaculate Conception ==
Construction on the new monastery, locally known as "the Castle on the Hill", was begun in 1883 on a hill east of Ferdinand known as "Mount Tabor", and completed between 1886 and 1888. The first part of the monastery completed was the quadrangle, the sisters' residence. A large addition was added in 1903.

The monastery chapel was designed by St. Louis architect Viktor Klutho. Construction started in 1915. Work on the interior was not completed until 1924. The chapel's Gothic high altar was surmounted by statues imported from Munich representing the Immaculate Conception, Saint Benedict, and Saint Scholastica. Other large statues represent some of the noted saints of the order.

The pews were hand-carved by German artisans. The Stations of the Cross were carved in Munich, as were the 47 stained glass windows. Eighty-nine angels adorn the church, in stained glass, statues, and carvings.

== Conservation ==
In 1983, the Monastery and other outbuildings and structures were added to the National Register of Historic Places as the Convent Immaculate Conception Historic District. The complex includes the main building constructed in 1883–1887. A major expansion to the complex began in 1915 and includes the Romanesque Revival style convent chapel.

== Sisters of St. Benedict of Ferdinand, Indiana ==

In 1861 the Benedictine priest Chrysostom Foffa assumed the duties of pastor of St. Ferdinand Church. He persuaded the Sisters of Providence of Saint Mary-of-the-Woods to teach in the parish school, but they did not have sufficient German-speaking sisters to meet the needs of the parish. He then approached the St. Walburg Monastery in Covington, Kentucky. Four sisters arrived in August 1867. As the sisters community grew, they also took up teaching in the parish school at Fulda and Saint Meinrad. In 1870, they opened Academy Immaculate Conception, later renamed Marian Heights Academy, a boarding school for girls. (Marian Heights Academy closed in 2000.) In 1871, the Benedictine Sisters of Ferdinand became an independent congregation. In 1872, the sisters purchased sixty-four acres of farmland adjoining the convent grounds to provide some necessities. In 1878, four sisters from Ferdinand established a mission at Standing Rock Indian Reservation in South Dakota. The chief occupation of the sisters was teaching; in each parish, they also had charge of the vestry and altar linens. The sisters were engaged in the preparation of church vestments and skilled in silk and gold embroidery. The motherhouse published a monthly newsletter, Die Taube to keep sisters at various missions in touch and informed. Up until the First World War, German was the language commonly spoken at the monastery. Proud of their German heritage, some German phrases are still found in common use there. In 1914 St. Benedict Normal College was founded to train teachers. Eventually sisters taught in more than seventy-five schools in twelve states and five countries. In 1956, St. Benedict admitted laywomen and in 1960, the college began admitting men but ultimately closed in the spring of 1970.

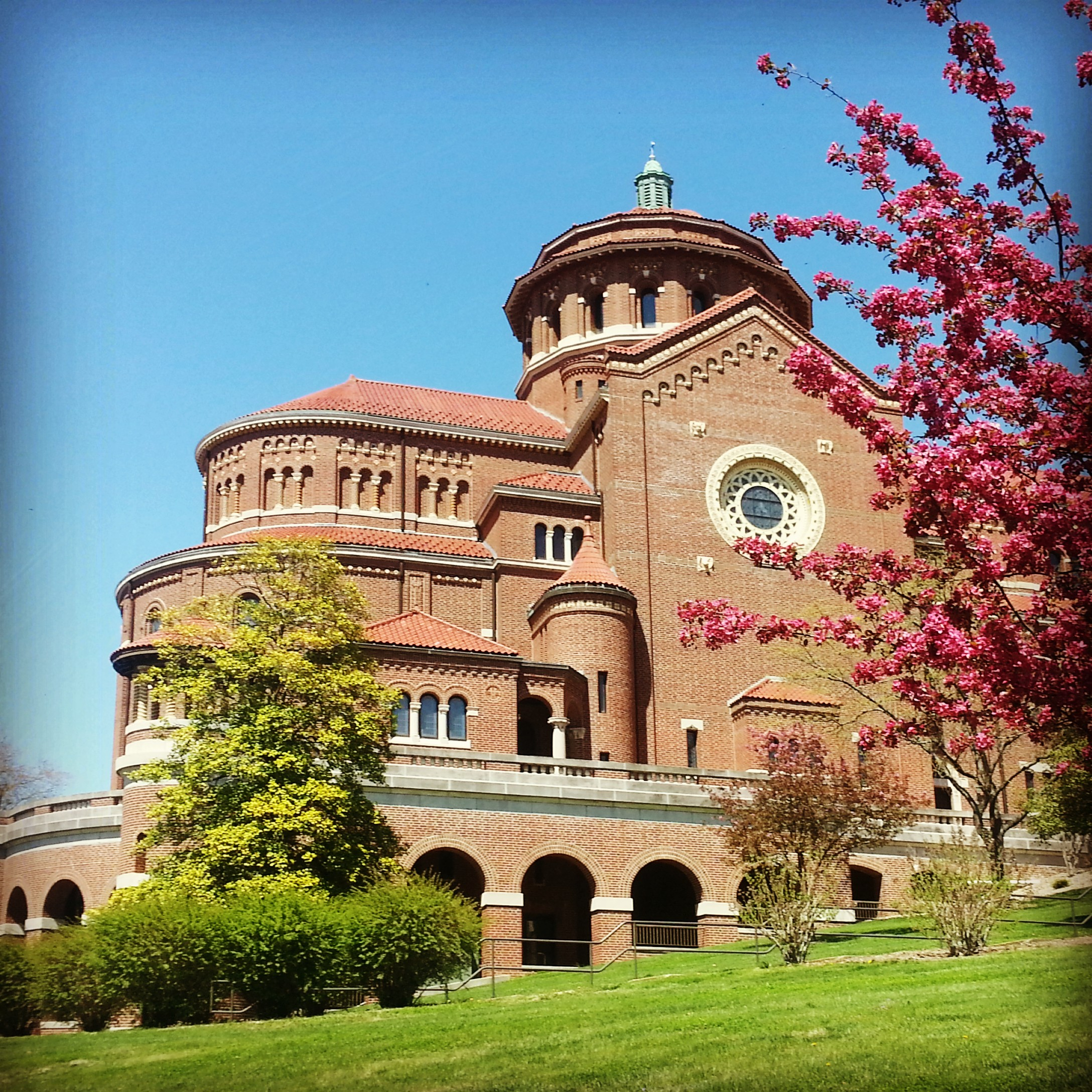
Monastery of the Immaculate Conception, Ferdinand, Indiana

Our Lady of Grace Monastery in Beech Grove, Indiana was founded as a daughter house of Immaculate Conception.

Although the abbey faced declining numbers in the late 20th century, this trend has since reversed. The Benedictine Hospitality Center is located at the Monastery of the Immaculate Conception. In 2016, Benet Hall, on the monastery grounds, was converted into fifteen affordable, senior citizen apartments. The apartment building serves persons 55 and over that meet certain income requirements. The sisters' "Simply Divine Bakery" produces a variety of baked goods according to traditional German recipes; these are sold in the monastery gift shop. There is also a kitchen garden. The academy's former art building was rented to the privately owned St. Benedict's Brew Works which opened in August 2015.

As of 2019, there were 134 members of the congregation. Their apostolates include teaching, serving in parishes, offering retreats, providing health care, counseling, working with immigrant populations, and helping the homeless, the poor, and those recovering from addictions.
