= Dubois County Courthouse =

- U.S. National Register of Historic Places
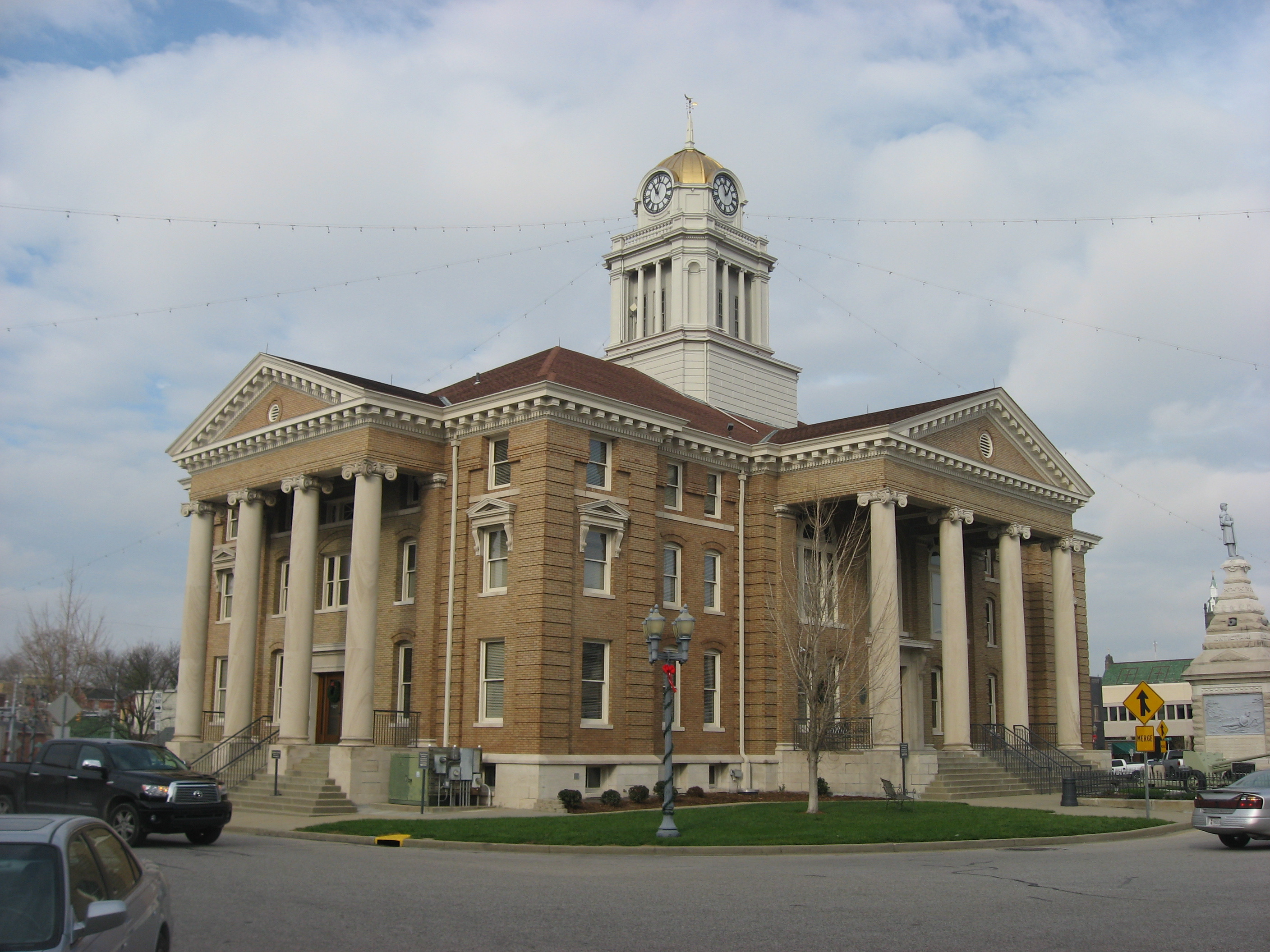
- Dubois County Courthouse, December 2011

- Location within Indiana Location within the United States
- Location: One Courthouse Sq., Jasper, Indiana
- Coordinates: 38°23′29″N 86°55′52″W
- Area: 0.5 acres (0.20 ha)
- Built: 1894, 1909-1911
- Architect: Milburn, Frank P.; Heister, Michael, et al.
- Architectural style: Classical Revival
- NRHP reference No.: 95001538
- Added to NRHP: January 11, 1996

Dubois County Courthouse is a historic courthouse located at Jasper, Indiana. It was designed by the architectural firm Milburn & Heister and built between 1909 and 1911. It is a three-story, Classical Revival style reinforced concrete and masonry building. It features a cupola that rises 100 feet high and pedimented porticos with Ionic order columns. Also on the property is the contributing Soldiers and Sailors Monument erected in 1894.

It was added to the National Register of Historic Places in 1996.

== Gallery ==
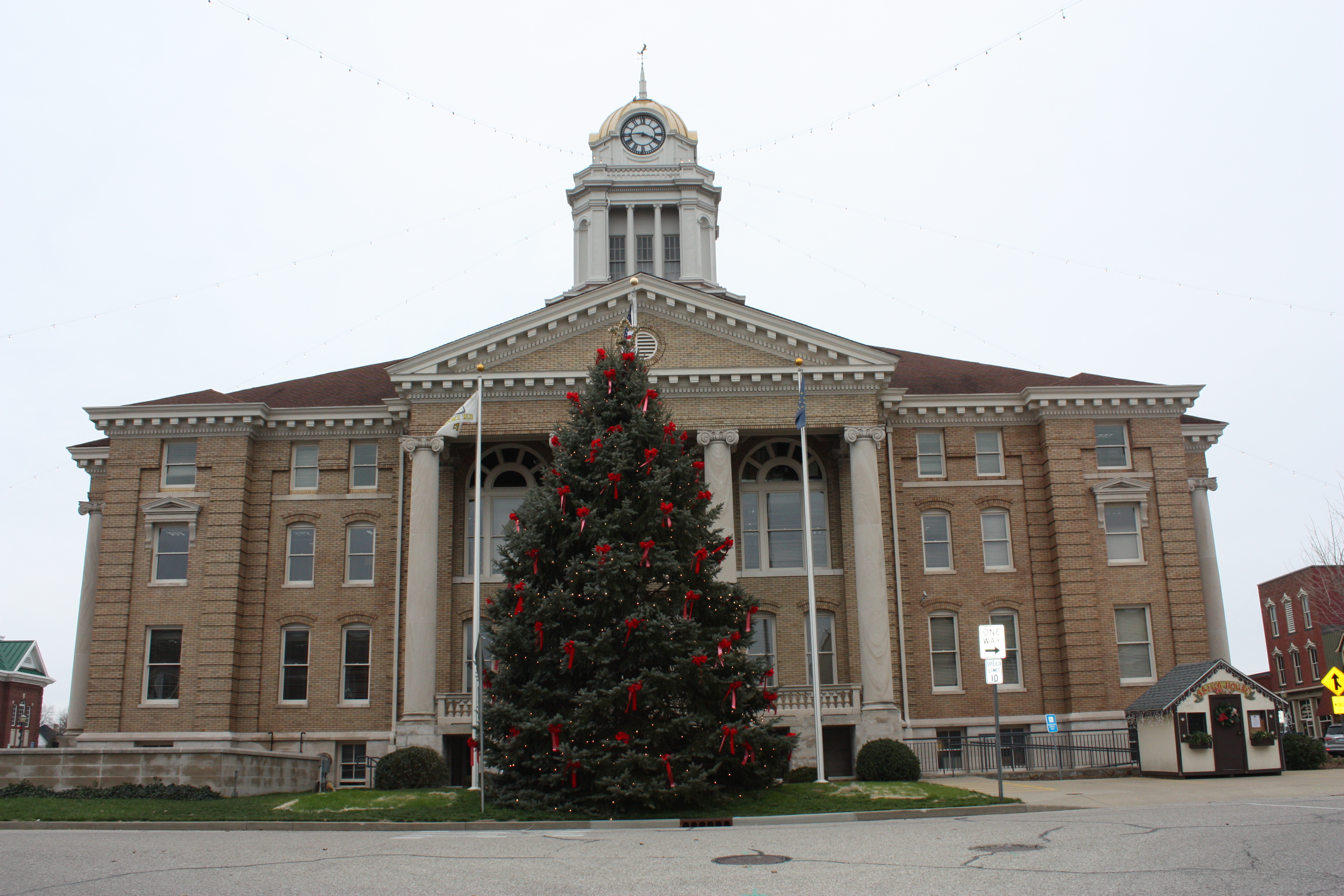
Front view with Christmas tree

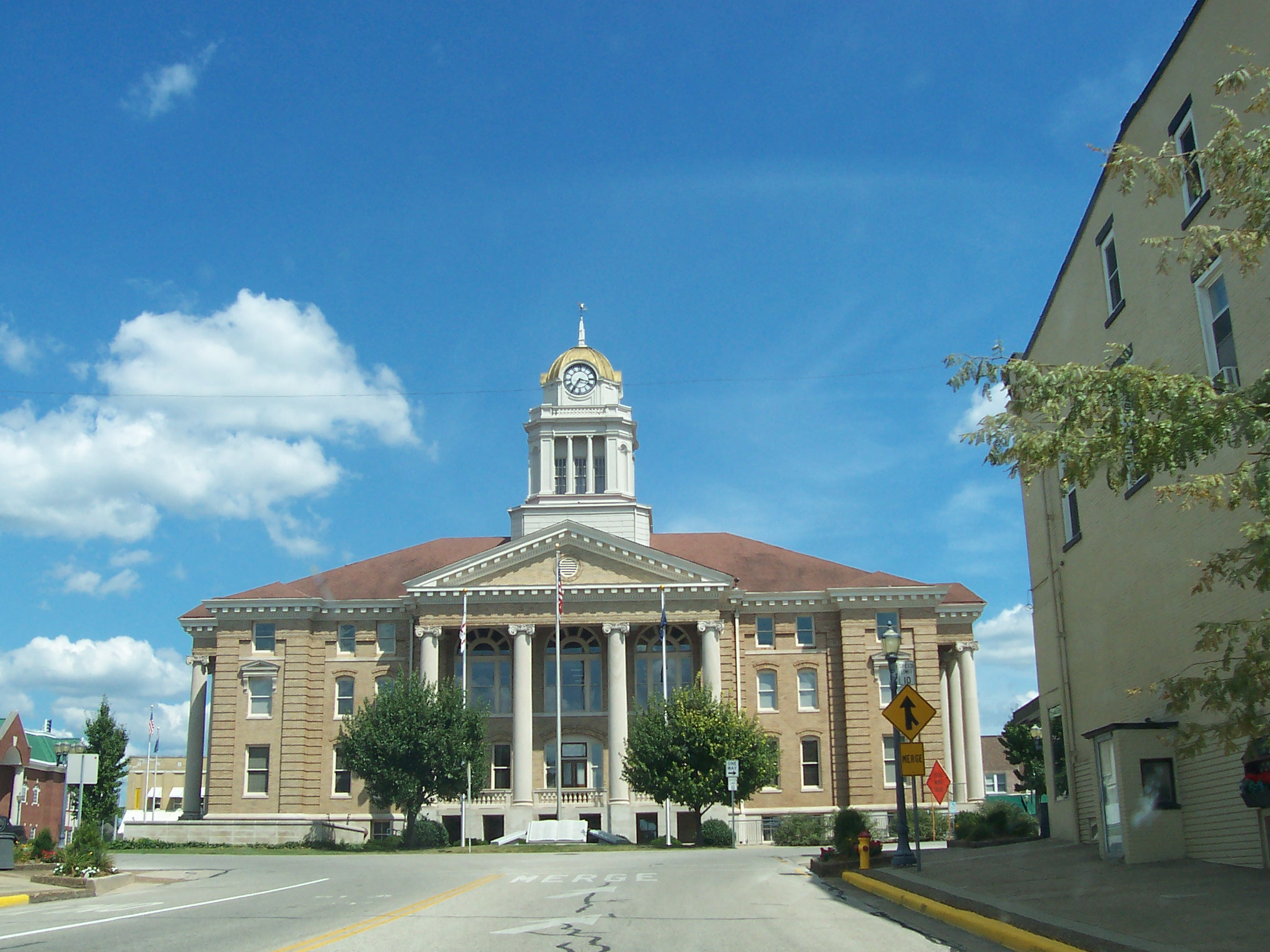
The courthouse in 2008

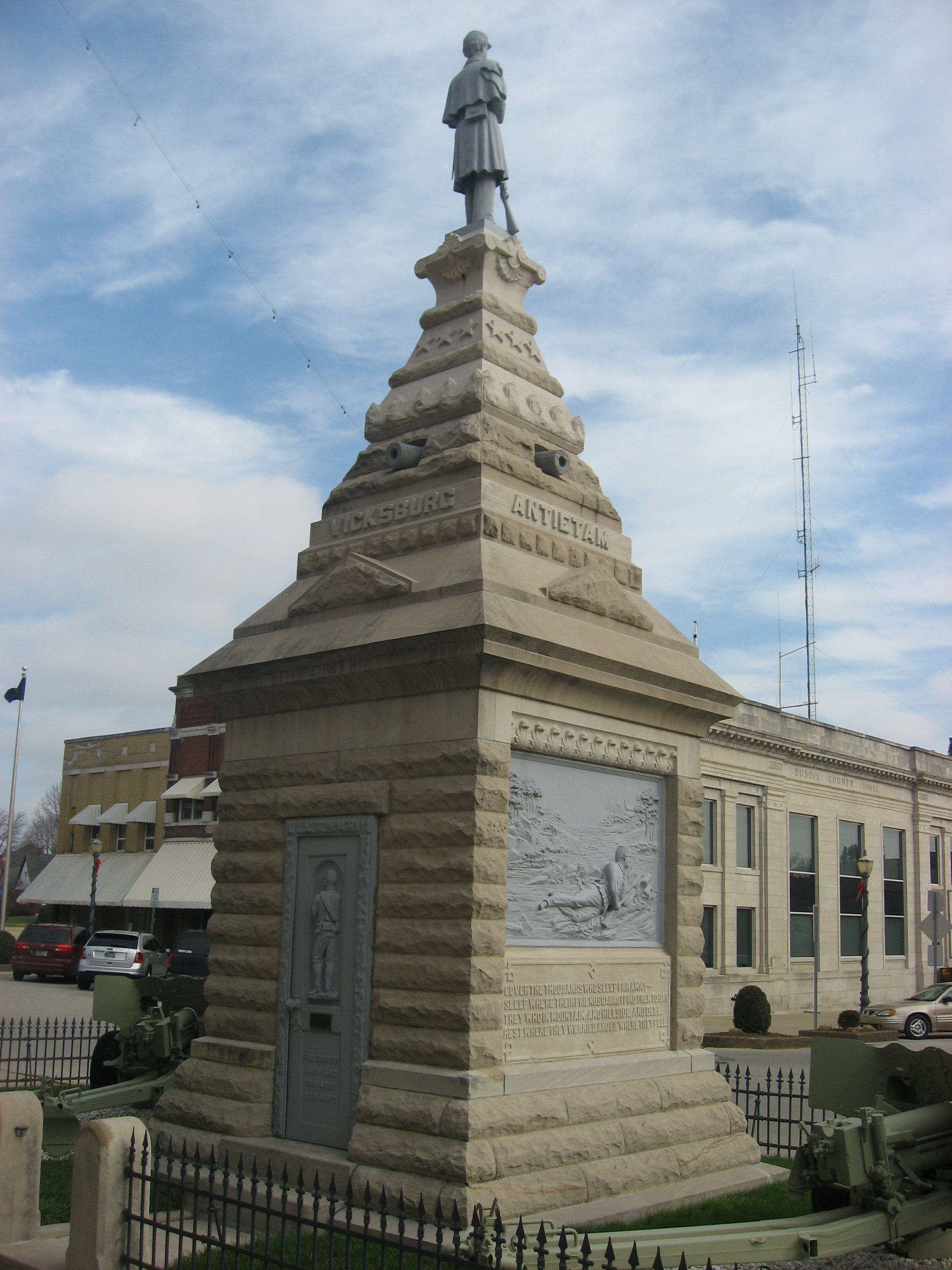
The Soldiers and Sailors Monument
