= Wilfrid Worland =

American architect

Wilfrid V. Worland (1907–1999) was an American architect who specialized in designing townhouses and apartment buildings in the Washington, D.C. area. His designs include a six-story apartment building in Cathedral Heights called The Worland, and the 25-acre Worland community of 92 townhouses in Potomac, Maryland.
