= Louis H. Sturm Hardware Store =

- U.S. National Register of Historic Places
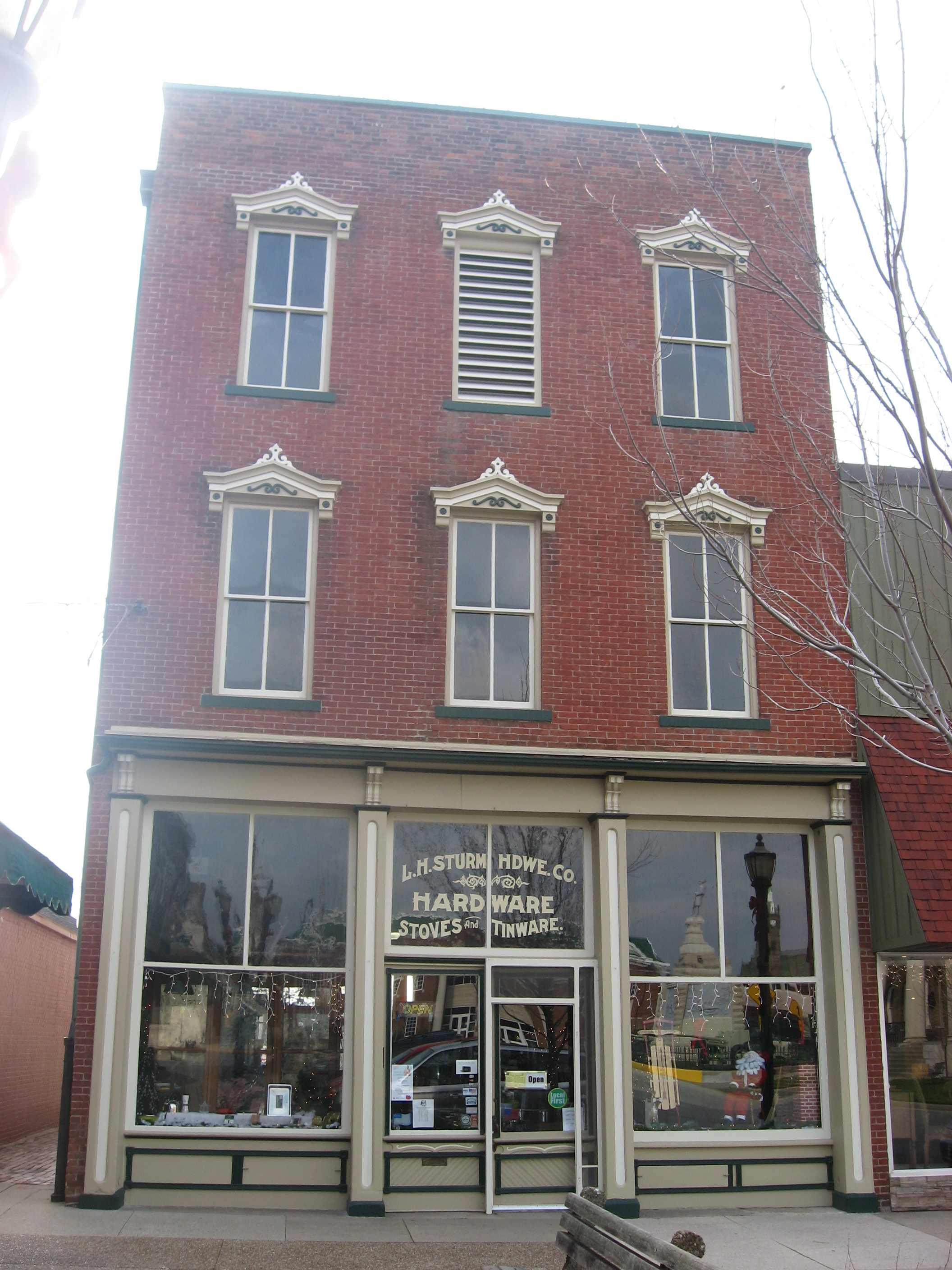
- Louis H. Sturm Hardware Store, December 2011

- Location within Indiana Location within the United States
- Location: 516 Main St., Jasper, Indiana
- Coordinates: 38°23′27″N 86°55′49″W
- Area: less than one acre
- Built: 1886
- Built by: Hochgesang Brothers
- Architectural style: Italianate
- NRHP reference No.: 03000975
- Added to NRHP: September 28, 2003

Louis H. Sturm Hardware Store is a historic commercial building located at Jasper, Indiana. It was built about 1850, and is a three-story, three-bay, Italianate-style brick building. It houses the oldest continuously operated commercial retail business in Jasper.

It was added to the National Register of Historic Places in 2003.
