= Gramelspacher-Gutzweiler House =

Historic house in Indiana, United States

- Gramelspacher–Gutzweiler House
- U.S. National Register of Historic Places
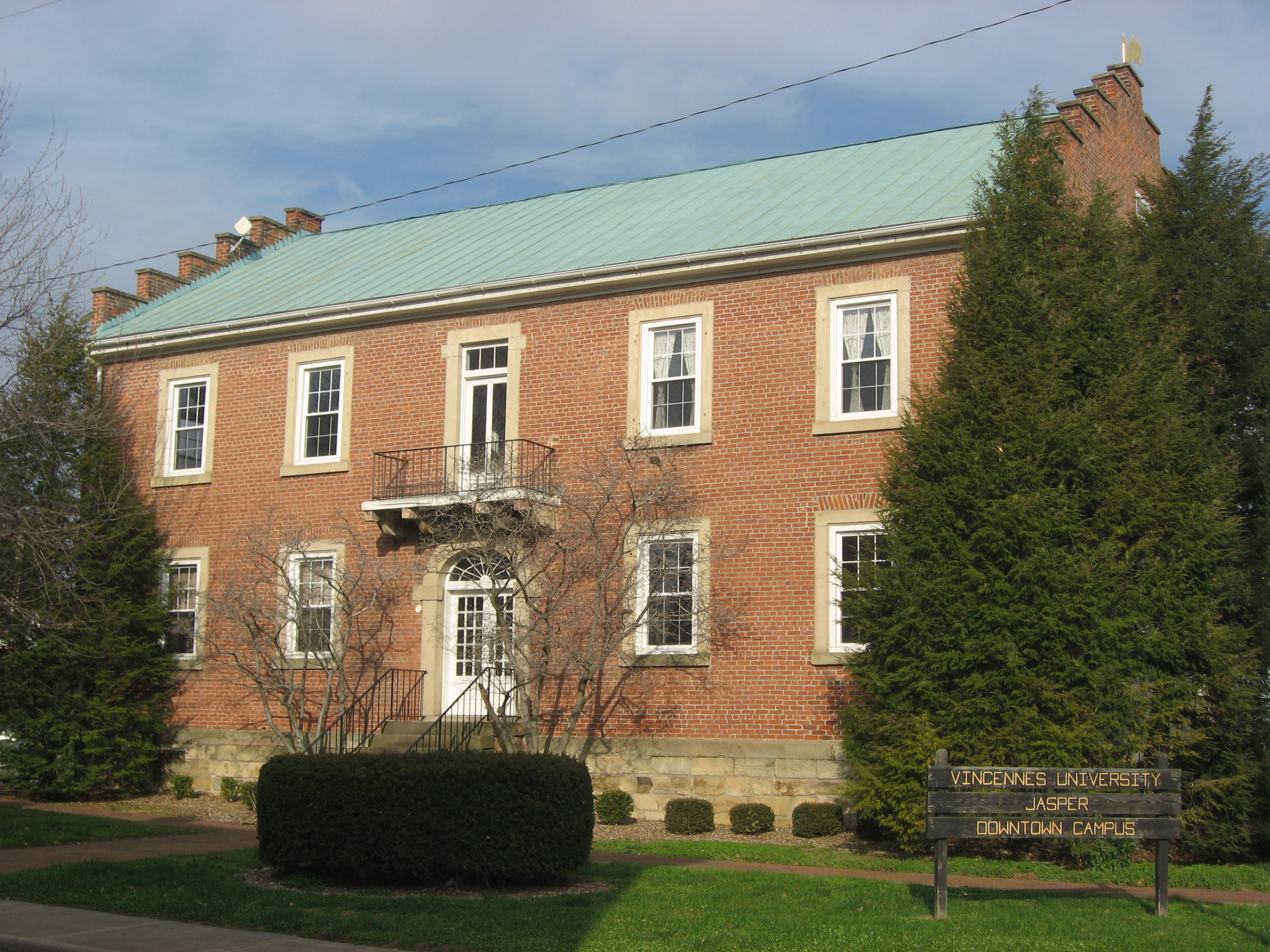
- Gramelspacher–Gutzweiler House, December 2011

- Location within Indiana Location within the United States
- Location: 11th and Main Sts., Jasper, Indiana
- Coordinates: 38°23′42″N 86°55′52″W
- Area: less than one acre
- Built: 1849
- Architectural style: Federal
- NRHP reference No.: 83000027
- Added to NRHP: February 26, 1983

Gramelspacher–Gutzweiler House is a historic home that is located at Jasper, Indiana. It was built in 1849, and is a two-story, five bay by three bay, Federal style brick dwelling on a high fieldstone basement. It has a gable roof and features stepped gable ends with six levels of corbiesteps.

It was added to the National Register of Historic Places in 1983.

The Jasper-Dubois County Public Library bought the home in 2012 and converted it into their administrative offices.
