= Ferdinand, Indiana =

- Town
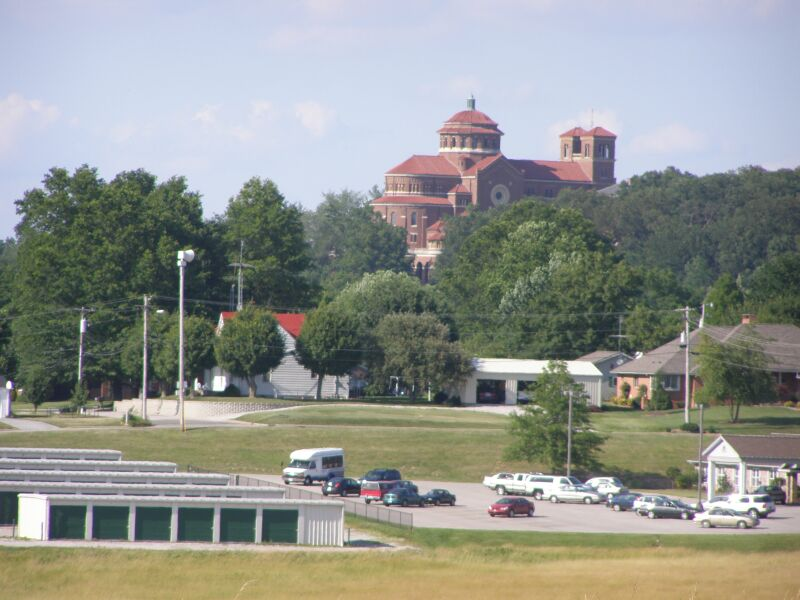
- Monastery Immaculate Conception

- Flag Logo

- Location of Ferdinand in Dubois County, Indiana.
- Coordinates: 38°13′37″N 86°51′47″W
- Country: United States
- State: Indiana
- County: Dubois
- Township: Ferdinand

Area
  - Total: 2.33 sq mi (6.04 km^{2})
  - Land: 2.30 sq mi (5.95 km^{2})
  - Water: 0.039 sq mi (0.10 km^{2})
- Elevation: 535 ft (163 m)

Population (2020)
  - Total: 2,157
  - Density: 939.2/sq mi (362.64/km^{2})
- Time zone: UTC-5 (Eastern (EST))
  - Summer (DST): UTC-5 (EDT)
- ZIP code: 47532
- Area code: 812
- FIPS code: 18-22990
- GNIS feature ID: 2396936
- Website: www.ferdinandindiana.org

Ferdinand is a town in Ferdinand Township, Dubois County, in the U.S. state of Indiana. The population was 2,157 at the 2020 census.

== History ==
Ferdinand was founded in 1840 by Fr. Joseph Kundek and was named after the Emperor Ferdinand I of Austria. The town was settled by mostly German-speaking people from central Europe. At one time Ferdinand was known as the wooden shoe village. At the end of the 19th century, Ferdinand contained many businesses, including a machine works, a brick works, brewery, several taverns, and a dairy.

The Ferdinand post office has been in operation since 1850.

In 1867, the Monastery of Immaculate Conception was founded in Ferdinand.

Ferdinand was incorporated as a town in 1905.

In 1906, the Ferdinand News was established as the local newspaper.

Just prior to World War II the Civilian Conservation Corps created the Ferdinand State Forest.

The Monastery Immaculate Conception and Dr. Alois Wollenmann House are listed on the National Register of Historic Places.

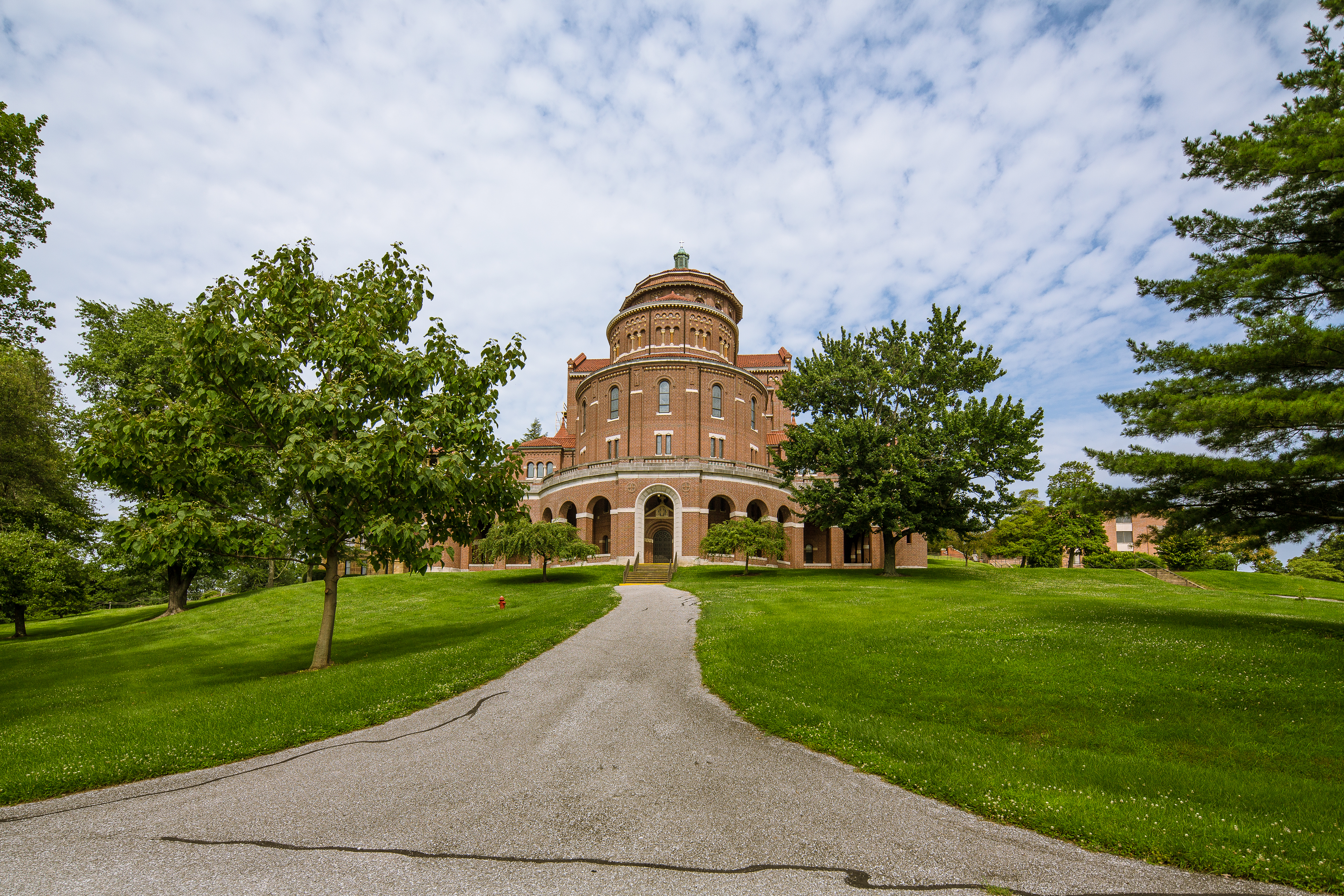
Photo from Small Town Indiana photo survey.

== Geography ==
Ferdinand is located at 38°13′31″N 86°51′40″W (38.225392, -86.860996).

According to the 2010 census, Ferdinand has a total area of 2.31 square miles (5.98 km^{2}), of which 2.27 square miles (5.88 km^{2}) (or 98.27%) is land and 0.04 square miles (0.10 km^{2}) (or 1.73%) is water.

== Demographics ==
Historical population
Census	Pop.	Note	%±
1880	500		—
1890	627		25.4%
1910	827		—
1920	884		6.9%
1930	846		−4.3%
1940	990		17.0%
1950	1,252		26.5%
1960	1,427		14.0%
1970	1,432		0.4%
1980	2,192		53.1%
1990	2,318		5.7%
2000	2,277		−1.8%
2010	2,157		−5.3%
2020	2,157		0.0%
U.S. Decennial Census

=== 2020 census ===
As of the 2020 census, Ferdinand had a population of 2,157. The median age was 45.7 years. 20.5% of residents were under the age of 18 and 26.1% of residents were 65 years of age or older. For every 100 females there were 77.8 males, and for every 100 females age 18 and over there were 73.1 males age 18 and over.

0.0% of residents lived in urban areas, while 100.0% lived in rural areas.

There were 868 households in Ferdinand, of which 25.8% had children under the age of 18 living in them. Of all households, 47.6% were married-couple households, 17.4% were households with a male householder and no spouse or partner present, and 30.3% were households with a female householder and no spouse or partner present. About 33.6% of all households were made up of individuals and 15.4% had someone living alone who was 65 years of age or older.

There were 933 housing units, of which 7.0% were vacant. The homeowner vacancy rate was 1.9% and the rental vacancy rate was 8.2%.

Racial composition as of the 2020 census
Race	Number	Percent
White	2,082	96.5%
Black or African American	3	0.1%
American Indian and Alaska Native	9	0.4%
Asian	10	0.5%
Native Hawaiian and Other Pacific Islander	0	0.0%
Some other race	30	1.4%
Two or more races	23	1.1%
Hispanic or Latino (of any race)	44	2.0%

=== 2010 census ===
As of the census of 2010, there were 2,157 people, 823 households, and 566 families residing in the town. The population density was 950.2 inhabitants per square mile (366.9/km^{2}). There were 866 housing units at an average density of 381.5 per square mile (147.3/km^{2}). The racial makeup of the town was 98.2% White, 0.1% African American, 0.2% Asian, 0.4% from other races, and 1.0% from two or more races. Hispanic or Latino of any race were 1.6% of the population.

There were 823 households, of which 30.9% had children under the age of 18 living with them, 55.9% were married couples living together, 9.1% had a female householder with no husband present, 3.8% had a male householder with no wife present, and 31.2% were non-families. 27.5% of all households were made up of individuals, and 14.8% had someone living alone who was 65 years of age or older. The average household size was 2.38 and the average family size was 2.89.

The median age in the town was 45.1 years. 21% of residents were under the age of 18; 6.2% were between the ages of 18 and 24; 22.6% were from 25 to 44; 25% were from 45 to 64; and 25.2% were 65 years of age or older. The gender makeup of the town was 44.5% male and 55.5% female.

=== 2000 census ===
As of the census of 2000, there were 2,277 people, 808 households, and 569 families residing in the town. The population density was 1,017.3 inhabitants per square mile (392.8/km^{2}). There were 845 housing units at an average density of 377.5 per square mile (145.8/km^{2}). The racial makeup of the town was 99.03% White, 0.04% African American, 0.09% Native American, 0.18% Asian, 0.09% Pacific Islander, 0.31% from other races, and 0.26% from two or more races. Hispanic or Latino of any race were 0.61% of the population.

There were 808 households, out of which 35.3% had children under the age of 18 living with them, 60.9% were married couples living together, 7.7% had a female householder with no husband present, and 29.5% were non-families. 27.1% of all households were made up of individuals, and 14.0% had someone living alone who was 65 years of age or older. The average household size was 2.51 and the average family size was 3.09.

In the town, the population was spread out, with 24.8% under the age of 18, 5.7% from 18 to 24, 28.6% from 25 to 44, 20.9% from 45 to 64, and 20.1% who were 65 years of age or older. The median age was 39 years. For every 100 females, there were 78.9 males. For every 100 females age 18 and over, there were 74.3 males.

The median income for a household in the town was $41,326, and the median income for a family was $52,065. Males had a median income of $34,205 versus $23,646 for females. The per capita income for the town was $18,335. About 3.4% of families and 9.9% of the population were below the poverty line, including 4.2% of those under age 18 and 16.1% of those age 65 or over.

== Attractions ==
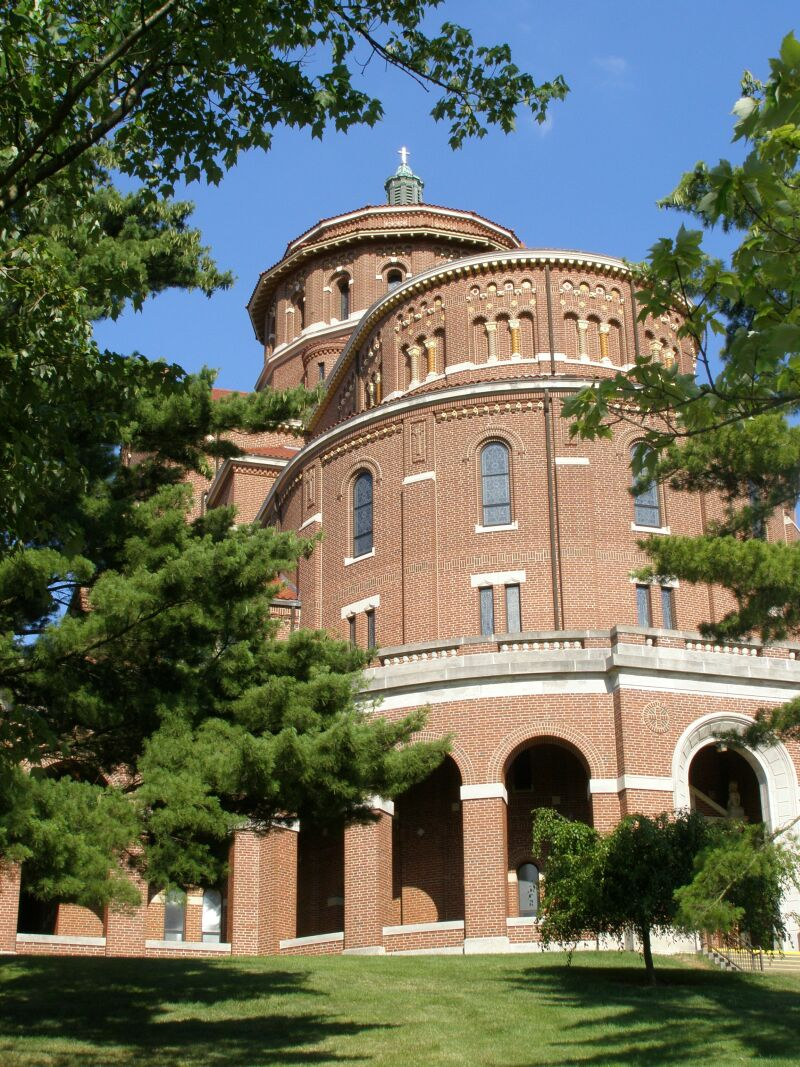
Monastery of Immaculate Conception closeup

Attractions in Ferdinand include:

- Monastery Immaculate Conception, the monastery of The Sisters of St. Benedict of Ferdinand
- Ferdinand State Forest

== Education ==
- Forest Park Jr./Sr. High School
- Ferdinand Elementary School
- Cedar Crest Intermediate School

The town has a public library, a branch of the Jasper-Dubois County Public Library.

== Churches ==
- St. Ferdinand Catholic Church
