= Portersville, Indiana =

- Unincorporated community
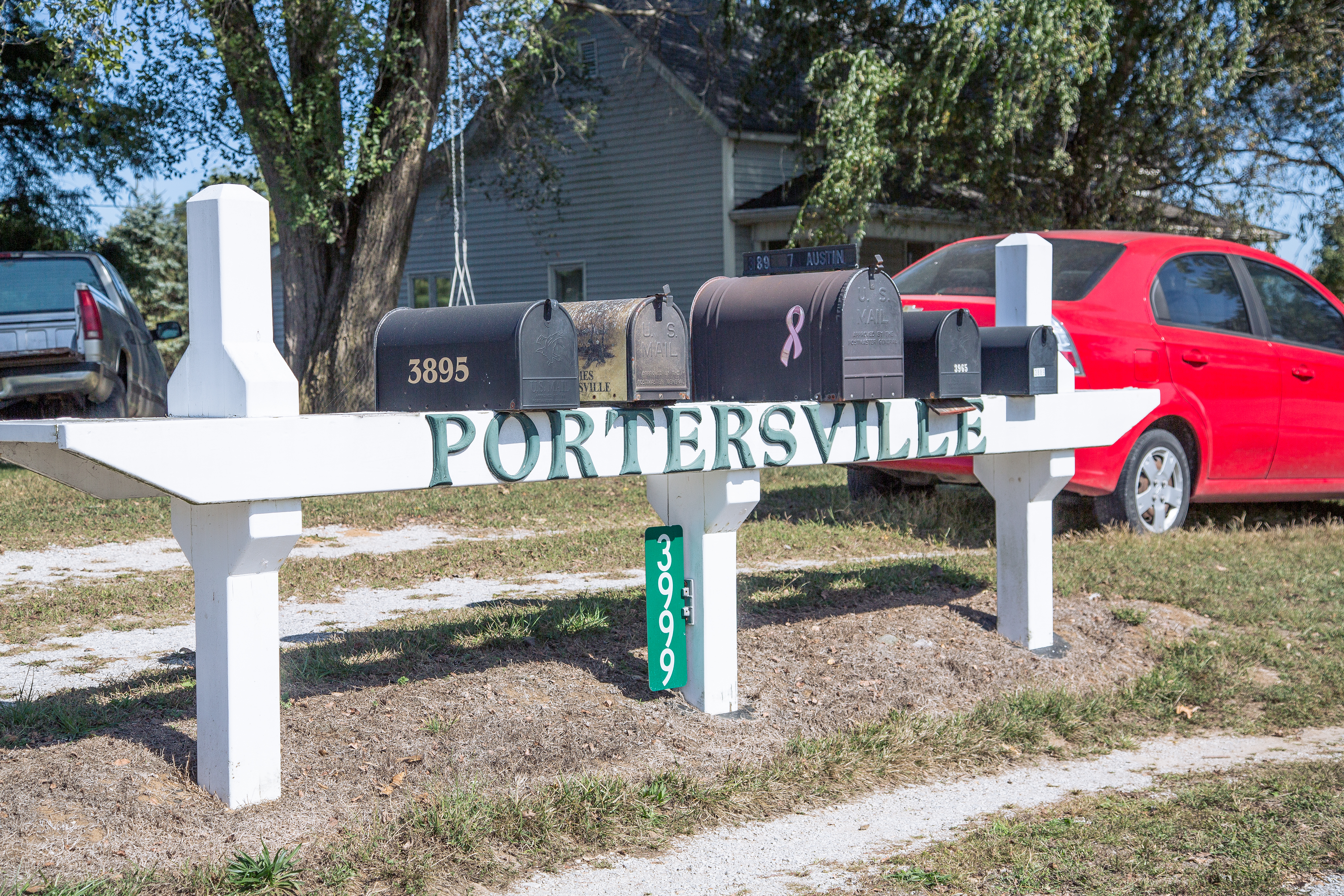

- Location within Indiana Location within the United States
- Coordinates: 38°29′58″N 86°58′42″W
- Country: United States
- State: Indiana
- County: Dubois
- Township: Boone
- Elevation: 472 ft (144 m)
- Time zone: UTC-5 (Eastern (EST))
  - Summer (DST): UTC-4 (EDT)
- ZIP code: 47546
- Area codes: 812, 930
- FIPS code: 18-61200
- GNIS feature ID: 441469

Portersville is an unincorporated community in Boone Township, Dubois County, in the U.S. state of Indiana.

== History ==
Portersville was established as a town circa 1818. It is reportedly the oldest town in Dubois County, and was selected as the county seat of Dubois County before it was changed to Jasper. A post office was established at Portersville in 1821, and remained in operation until it was discontinued in 1909.
