= Boone Township, Dubois County, Indiana =

Boone Township
- Township
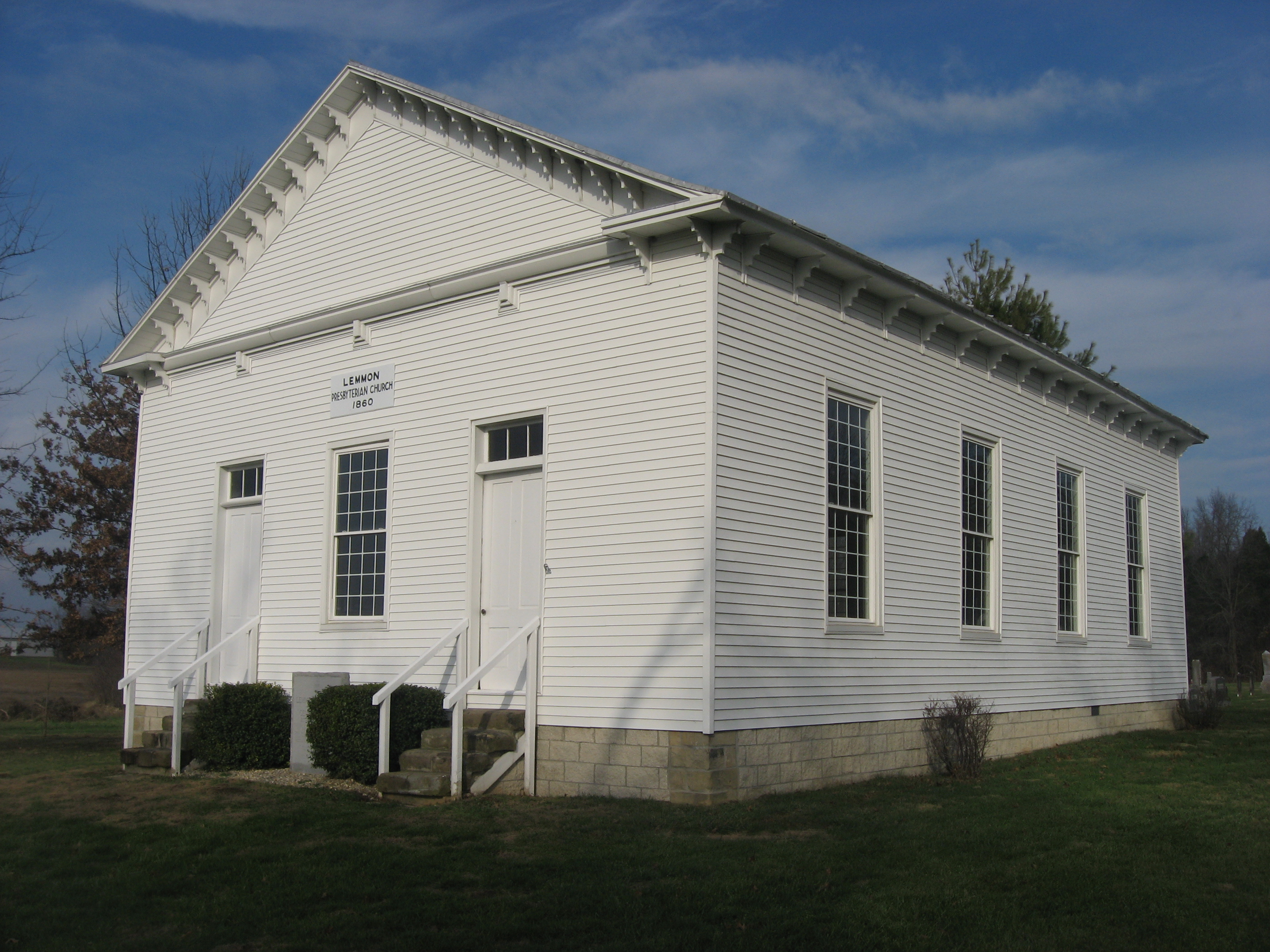
- Lemmon Presbyterian Church, a historic site in the township

- Location of Boone Township in Dubois County
- Coordinates: 38°28′23″N 87°00′44″W
- Country: United States
- State: Indiana
- County: Dubois

Government
  - Type: Indiana township

Area
  - Total: 33.55 sq mi (86.9 km^{2})
  - Land: 33.25 sq mi (86.1 km^{2})
  - Water: 0.29 sq mi (0.75 km^{2})
- Elevation: 456 ft (139 m)

Population (2020)
  - Total: 962
  - Density: 24/sq mi (9.3/km^{2})
- FIPS code: 18-06526
- GNIS feature ID: 453127

Boone Township is one of twelve townships in Dubois County, Indiana. As of the 2010 census, its population was 799 and it contained 321 housing units.

== History ==
The Lemmon's Presbyterian Church was listed on the National Register of Historic Places in 1992.

== Geography ==
According to the 2010 census, the township has a total area of 33.55 square miles (86.9 km^{2}), of which 33.25 square miles (86.1 km^{2}) (or 99.11%) is land and 0.29 square miles (0.75 km^{2}) (or 0.86%) is water.

=== Unincorporated towns ===
- Portersville

=== Adjacent townships ===
- Reeve Township, Daviess County (north)
- Harbison Township (east)
- Bainbridge Township (southeast)
- Madison Township (south)
- Jefferson Township, Pike County (west)
- Harrison Township, Daviess County (northwest)

=== Major highways ===
- Indiana State Road 56

=== Cemeteries ===
The township contains two cemeteries: Bethel and Sherritt.
