= Tornado outbreak sequence of August 4–8, 2023 =

Severe weather event in 2023

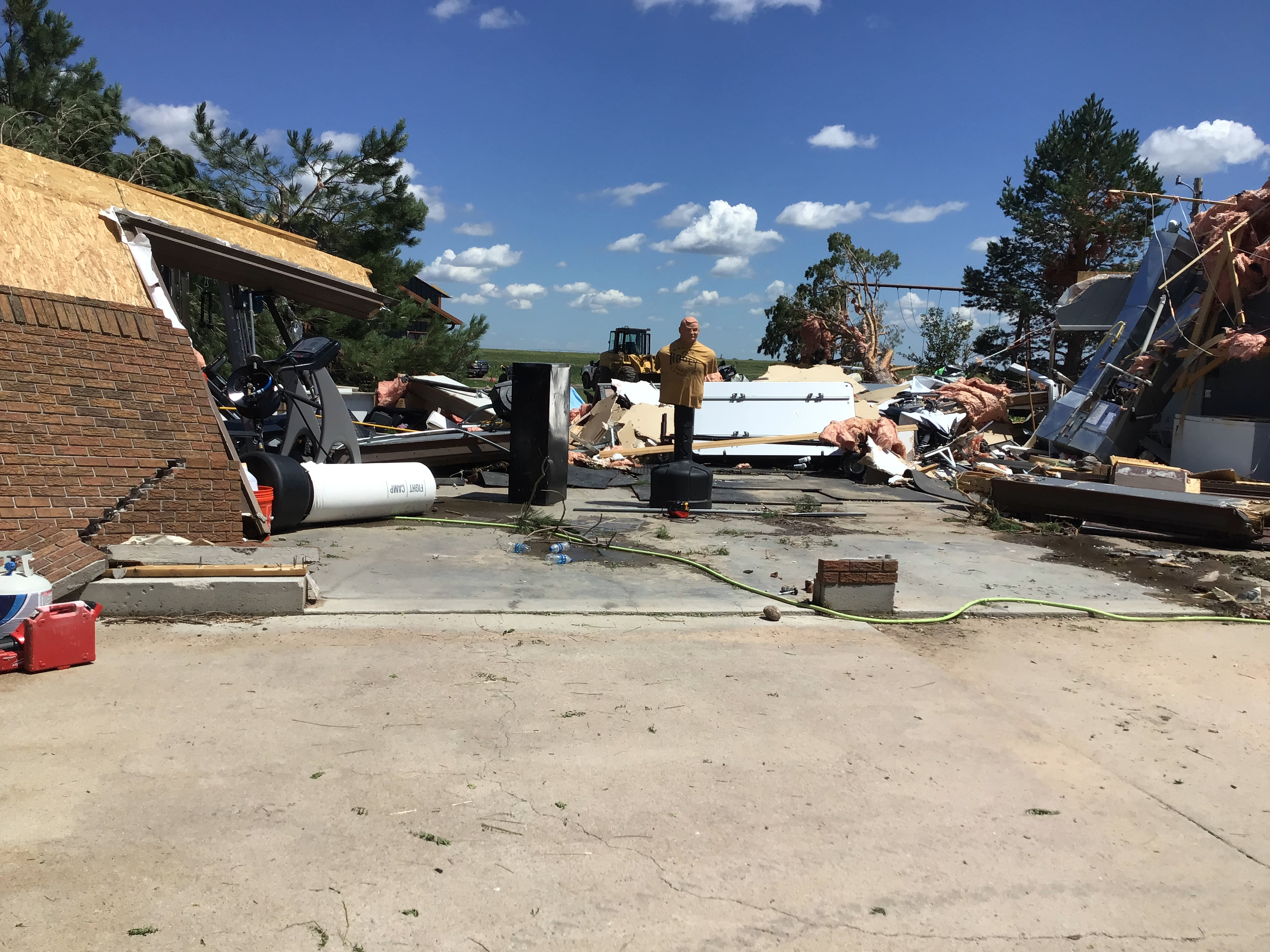
- Low-end EF3 damage to the attached garage of a well-built home near Yuma, Colorado.

Tornado outbreak
- Tornadoes: 54
- Max. rating: EF3 tornado
- Duration: August 4–8, 2023
- Highest winds: 150 mph (240 km/h) (Yuma, Colorado EF3 on August 8)
- Largest hail: 5.25 in (13.3 cm) near Kirk, Colorado on August 8

Overall effects
- Fatalities: 2 non-tornadic
- Injuries: 2
- Damage: $1.6 billion (2023 USD)
- Areas affected: Great Plains, Midwestern, and Eastern United States
- Power outages: >1,100,000
- Part of the tornado outbreaks of 2023

From August 4–8, 2023, an unusual late-season severe weather and tornado outbreak sequence impacted multiple regions of the United States. Throughout the five-day period, numerous tornadoes struck the Eastern United States, the Plains, the South and the Midwest. Some of the tornadoes were strong and caused major damage. This included an EF3 tornado formed in Lewis County, New York, causing severe damage to homes, barns, forested areas, a ski resort, and a motel. Another EF3 tornado touched down near Yuma, Colorado, causing significant damage to a home and several farm structures in Yuma County. In Baring, Missouri, a strong nocturnal EF2 tornado caused extensive damage throughout the town, where the local post office was destroyed, homes and businesses were damaged, and two people were injured. A long-tracked EF2 tornado moved through Sangamon and Christian counties in Illinois, destroying a house, damaging several other homes, and resulting in extensive tree damage along its path. The third EF2 tornado of the outbreak struck western portions of Knoxville, Tennessee, damaging multiple houses and an apartment complex. This severe weather outbreak sequence left approximately 1 million residents without power and led to over 1,000 preliminary wind reports. Additionally, heavy rainfall prompted a rare flash flood emergency in Cambridge, Maryland. Two non-tornadic fatalities (one in South Carolina and the other in Alabama) occurred as well.

== Meteorological synopsis ==
A moist and unstable air mass and very strong winds aloft were present on August 7, with a shortwave trough progressing towards northern portions of Appalachia, and convective available potential energy in the 2500-3500 values yielded for severe thunderstorm development. Thermodynamic and kinematic energy in and east of central portions of the Appalachian Mountains also contributed to thunderstorm development. A level 4/moderate risk for severe weather, along with a 10 percent tornado risk, a significant 45 percent wind risk, and a 15 percent hail risk was issued by the Storm Prediction Center on August 7, including the Washington, D.C. metro area, the first moderate risk in decades for the DC area. Several severe thunderstorms formed ahead of a cold front in eastern Ohio, eastern Kentucky and West Virginia and later congealed into a quasi-linear convective system while approaching Washington D.C., Philadelphia, and Charlotte, North Carolina, bringing widespread damaging winds.

== Confirmed tornadoes ==
Confirmed tornadoes by Enhanced Fujita rating
EFU	EF0	EF1	EF2	EF3	EF4	EF5	Total
16	15	17	4	2	0	0	54

=== August 4 event ===
List of confirmed tornadoes – Friday, August 4, 2023 (Note: All dates are based on the local time zone where the tornado touched down; however, all times are in Coordinated Universal Time for consistency.)
EF#	Location	County / Parish	State	Start Coord.	Time (UTC)	Path length	Max width
EF0	Millvile	Ray	MO	39.4059°N 93.9435°W	22:57–23:11	4.55 mi (7.32 km)	20 yd (18 m)
EF0	A weak tornado passed through Millville, causing roof damage to homes, including one that had its chimney knocked down. Outbuildings and trees were also damaged, and hay bales were tossed as well.						
EF0	E of Malta Bend	Saline	MO	39.1972°N 93.3529°W	00:17–00:20	1.54 mi (2.48 km)	20 yd (18 m)
EF0	A high-end EF0 tornado moved eastward along US 65, damaging trees and power poles.						
EF2	Baring	Knox	MO	40.26°N 92.22°W	04:13–04:15	1.64 mi (2.64 km)	450 yd (410 m)
EF2	This damaging tornado touched down southeast of Baring, quickly becoming strong and striking a farmstead as it moved along an unusual northwestward path. A house on the property had its roof and some exterior walls removed, a machine shed and a large outbuilding were completely destroyed, and grain bins were thrown up to a half-mile away. Trees and power poles were snapped nearby before the tornado moved directly through Baring, where significant damage occurred. The local post office was destroyed with only a few walls left standing, a mobile home was completely destroyed, and a few other mobile homes were heavily damaged. A restaurant was unroofed, vehicles were damaged, and shipping containers and anhydrous ammonia tanks were tossed around. A couple of one-story apartment buildings had partial to total roof loss, and frame homes in town sustained considerable roof, siding, and window damage. Sheds, garages, and outbuildings were damaged or destroyed, and many large trees were snapped or uprooted. A total of 7 businesses and 62 homes were damaged or destroyed in Baring before the tornado exited town and moved to the north-northwest. An outbuilding and some trees sustained minor damage before the tornado dissipated. Two people were injured.						

=== August 5 event ===
List of confirmed tornadoes – Saturday, August 5, 2023
EF#	Location	County / Parish	State	Start Coord.	Time (UTC)	Path length	Max width
EF1	SW of Marcelline to NW of Mendon	Adams	IL	40.1099°N 91.3759°W	07:24–07:31	2.87 mi (4.62 km)	200 yd (180 m)
EF1	A low-end EF1 tornado inflicted heavy roof and siding damage to a home, while another house suffered a broken window. Multiple outbuildings were damaged or destroyed, crops and power poles were damaged, and many trees were snapped or uprooted.						
EFU	ENE of Gleneagle to NW of Peyton	El Paso	CO	39.07°N 104.67°W	19:40–19:44	2.16 mi (3.48 km)	10 yd (9.1 m)
EFU	A trained spotter observed a tornado. No damage occurred.						
EF0	NNW of Maurice	Sioux	IA	42.993°N 96.21°W	19:30–19:33	0.92 mi (1.48 km)	30 yd (27 m)
EF0	A highly visible and slow-moving tornado damaged several hardwood trees.						
EFU	SSW of Sioux Center	Sioux	IA	43.047°N 96.209°W	19:42	0.05 mi (0.080 km)	10 yd (9.1 m)
EFU	A very brief tornado was photographed. No damage occurred.						
EF0	NE of Grand Tower	Jackson	IL	37.6556°N 89.4677°W	22:15–22:16	0.5 mi (0.80 km)	25 yd (23 m)
EF0	A brief tornado occurred in a field. No damage was observed.						
EFU	ENE of Willow Hill	Jasper	IL	39.02°N 87.97°W	22:30–22:31	0.11 mi (0.18 km)	20 yd (18 m)
EFU	A brief tornado touched down in an open field, causing no damage.						
EFU	E of Snyder	Dodge	NE	41.71°N 96.71°W	00:53	0.1 mi (0.16 km)	25 yd (23 m)
EFU	A brief tornado caused no damage.						
EFU	E of Arcadia	Carroll	IA	42.0859°N 94.9636°W	02:24–02:25	0.32 mi (0.51 km)	25 yd (23 m)
EFU	A brief tornado occurred, causing no damage.						
EF0	SSW of Auburn	Sac	IA	42.2139°N 94.8951°W	02:29–02:31	0.9 mi (1.4 km)	35 yd (32 m)
EF0	An outbuilding was damaged by this brief tornado, with debris being thrown into a farm field.						
EFU	SW of Auburn	Sac	IA	42.2235°N 94.9021°W	02:30–02:31	0.32 mi (0.51 km)	50 yd (46 m)
EFU	High resolution satellite imagery revealed a tornado path through open agricultural fields. Only crop damage occurred.						

=== August 6 event ===
List of confirmed tornadoes – Sunday, August 6, 2023
EF#	Location	County / Parish	State	Start Coord.	Time (UTC)	Path length	Max width
EF0	NE of Lima	Beaverhead	MT	44.677°N 112.411°W	20:12–20:19	1.64 mi (2.64 km)	40 yd (37 m)
EF0	A landspout tornado was caught on video near the Lima Reservoir. No damage occurred.						
EFU	S of Boulder	Jefferson	MT	46.079°N 112.133°W	21:11–21:17	3.66 mi (5.89 km)	70 yd (64 m)
EFU	A well-documented tornado occurred in the Whitetail Basin area. No structural damage occurred and most areas were inaccessible for surveying. This was the first ever recorded tornado in Jefferson County.						
EFU	SE of Dallas City to E of La Harpe	Hancock	IL	40.5776°N 91.0899°W	22:40–23:15	8.01 mi (12.89 km)	20 yd (18 m)
EFU	An intermittent multiple-vortex tornado was caught on video as it moved through open fields. No damage was reported.						
EF2	N of Pawnee to N of Taylorville to NW of Assumption	Sangamon, Christian	IL	39.6341°N 89.5702°W	23:09–00:03	25.31 mi (40.73 km)	450 yd (410 m)
EF2	A strong, long-tracked tornado touched down in Sangamon County near Pawnee, downing some trees and inflicting minor roof damage to a home before it quickly crossed into Christian County, damaging a few farm buildings and grain bins near the county line. It then strengthened as it moved across Sangchris Lake and passed between Kincaid and Sharpsburg, snapping and uprooting numerous large trees and tearing roofing and siding from a few homes, one of which was shifted off its foundation and had an exterior wall pushed in. A couple of barns were damaged along this segment of the path as well. The tornado then passed north of Taylorville and reached peak intensity near Willeys, where about two-thirds of a one-story house was destroyed, two other homes had roof damage, and a metal outbuilding was heavily damaged. Father east, the tornado rolled and destroyed a camper, damaged the roof of another house, snapped additional trees, and flattened corn in farm fields before it dissipated.						
EF1	W of Haysville to SSW of Paoli	Dubois, Orange	IN	38.4896°N 86.9426°W	04:24–04:53	25.9 mi (41.7 km)	200 yd (180 m)
EF1	This long-tracked, high-end EF1 tornado first damaged or destroyed a few outbuildings and tore fencing apart before it moved directly through Haysville. A business, some outbuildings, and a couple of homes in and around town suffered roof and gutter damage, and a greenhouse was destroyed. The tornado continued to the east of Haysville, unroofing a one-story house, inflicting minor damage to another house, and damaging or destroying multiple barns. It then struck Kellerville, damaging trees and a trailer before it passed near Dubois Crossroads, where at least 10 large poultry barns were heavily damaged or destroyed, killing numerous turkeys. Moving eastward, the tornado impacted Crystal, where homes, grain bins, and outbuildings were damaged. It then passed near Hillham, tossing and destroying a camper, damaging or destroying outbuildings and garages, and damaging several homes, one of which sustained destruction of its attached garage. As the tornado tracked south of French Lick, it rolled multiple vehicles, trailers, and mobile homes. A house and a cabin in this area had roof and siding damage, a metal carport and an outbuilding were destroyed, and some power lines were downed. Farther along the path, a few homes had significant roof and exterior damage, barns and outbuildings were damaged or destroyed, and debris was scattered across fields before the tornado dissipated near Paoli. Countless trees were snapped or uprooted along the path.						
EF1	Southern French Lick	Orange	IN	38.5429°N 86.6233°W	04:45–04:46	0.98 mi (1.58 km)	40 yd (37 m)
EF1	A brief high-end EF1 tornado moved through the south side of French Lick, snapping or uprooting numerous large trees. Several houses sustained considerable roof and siding damage, and a sand storage barn had its roof torn off.						
EF1	Northern Paoli	Orange	IN	38.5636°N 86.4807°W	04:53–04:55	1 mi (1.6 km)	110 yd (100 m)
EF1	This tornado moved through the north side of Paoli, where multiple warehouses and commercial buildings had their roofs blown off, with sheet metal scattered up to 200 yd (180 m) away. Trees were snapped or uprooted, a few of which landed on homes. One house sustained collapse of its porch, and many power poles were downed as well. This was the first of three tornadoes that occurred simultaneously in or around Paoli.						
EF0	SSE of Paoli	Orange	IN	38.5345°N 86.4598°W	04:53–04:54	0.56 mi (0.90 km)	60 yd (55 m)
EF0	A brief high-end EF0 tornado crossed SR 37 just south of Paoli and moved through Pioneer Mothers Memorial Forest, snapping or uprooting many trees. This was the second of three tornadoes that occurred simultaneously in or around Paoli.						
EF1	Paoli to W of Livonia	Orange	IN	38.5577°N 86.4863°W	04:53–05:02	8.74 mi (14.07 km)	175 yd (160 m)
EF1	This tornado first caused minor roof damage at the Crestwood Manufacturing facility on the west side of Paoli before it moved directly through the downtown area, where some businesses suffered roof damage or had their brick facades damaged or partially collapsed. A church sustained roof damage and broken windows, and the Orange County Courthouse had multiple large chimneys knocked over. Many trees, power poles, and signs were blown over as well, including a couple of trees that fell on houses. The tornado then exited Paoli and tracked eastward, downing more trees and power lines, peeling back the roof of an outbuilding, causing crop damage, and heavily damaging two large grain silos as it moved through areas in and around the rural communities of Stampers Creek and Mahan Crossing. A manufactured home, an outbuilding, and trees were damaged in Millersburg before the tornado dissipated. This was the third of three tornadoes that occurred simultaneously in or around Paoli.						

=== August 7 event ===
List of confirmed tornadoes – Monday, August 7, 2023
EF#	Location	County / Parish	State	Start Coord.	Time (UTC)	Path length	Max width
EF1	Western Salem	Washington	IN	38.5957°N 86.1412°W	05:13–05:15	1.78 mi (2.86 km)	60 yd (55 m)
EF1	This tornado impacted the west edge of Salem, where a few businesses sustained roof, siding, and gutter damage, with debris scattered up to 150 yd (140 m) away. A metal garage structure at the Salem Speedway was also damaged, and trees and power poles were snapped as well.						
EF2	Western Knoxville	Knox	TN	35.9308°N 84.158°W	18:17–18:23	3.7 mi (6.0 km)	200 yd (180 m)
EF2	A high-end EF2 tornado embedded within a larger area of straight-line damage moved through several subdivisions and an apartment complex in the western part of Knoxville. Multiple three-story apartment buildings were heavily damaged and sustained roof loss, a debris impact left a large hole in the side of the apartment complex office, and a large garage structure on the property was completely destroyed. Multiple homes had major roof damage, wooden boards were driven into the ground, and many large hardwood trees were snapped or uprooted as well.						
EF1	S of Erwin, TN to WNW of Green Mountain	Yancey, Mitchell	NC	36.036°N 82.402°W	18:48–18:57	6.23 mi (10.03 km)	50 yd (46 m)
EF1	A rare high-altitude tornado moved through rugged mountainous terrain, uprooting multiple trees and snapping tree limbs. This was the first ever tornado recorded in Mitchell County and the third tornado ever recorded in Yancey County, being the first since June 6, 1977.						
EF1	NW of Louisa, KY to NE of Fort Gay, WV	Lawrence (KY), Wayne (WV)	KY, WV	38.1331°N 82.6784°W	19:00–19:10	6.31 mi (10.15 km)	400 yd (370 m)
EF1	In Kentucky, this tornado destroyed a small utility building, overturned a construction trailer and two semi-trailers, and snapped or uprooted many trees. Some of the trees fell on homes, one of which sustained extensive damage to its attached garage. The tornado crossed the Big Sandy River into West Virginia, where a house had siding torn off and additional trees were downed before the tornado dissipated.						
EF1	SW of Claremont to Northern Mooresville to E of China Grove	Catawba, Iredell, Rowan	NC	35.7°N 81.17°W	20:40–21:22	36.23 mi (58.31 km)	550 yd (500 m)
EF1	This weak but long-tracked tornado touched down near Claremont and moved southeastward, snapping many trees and tree branches. More trees were downed as the tornado crossed into Iredell County and struck the north side of Mooresville. The tornado crossed into Rowan County, where additional tree damage occurred and a mobile home had part of its roof torn off. It then moved through Landis, where buildings sustained minor damage and trees were toppled over onto homes. Some additional trees were uprooted to the east of China Grove before the tornado dissipated.						
EF1	Blackrock	York	PA	39.7225°N 76.8603°W	21:02–21:05	0.52 mi (0.84 km)	75 yd (69 m)
EF1	Trees and tree limbs were snapped in Blackrock, and damage to homes occurred as well. The roof of an outbuilding collapsed and another outbuilding was completely destroyed.						
EF0	Western Huntersville	Mecklenburg	NC	35.41°N 80.93°W	21:07–21:10	1.8 mi (2.9 km)	50 yd (46 m)
EF0	A weak tornado touched down just south of Lake Norman, uprooting some trees and inflicting minor exterior damage to a few homes as it moved through the western part of Huntersville.						
EF1	SSE of Dryden to SE of Blodgett Mills	Tompkins, Cortland	NY	42.4437°N 76.2688°W	21:13–21:36	11.11 mi (17.88 km)	200 yd (180 m)
EF1	This low-end EF1 tornado unroofed and partially collapsed outbuildings, snapped or uprooted dozens of trees, knocked over fences and a playground, and threw a raft into a tree. Some power lines were downed as well.						
EF1	E of Cross Roads	York	PA	39.8181°N 76.554°W	21:24–21:28	1.53 mi (2.46 km)	50 yd (46 m)
EF1	Corn was flattened in a farm field and dozens of trees were snapped.						
EFU	WNW of Bird City	Cheyenne	KS	39.7612°N 101.5728°W	21:35–21:36	0.24 mi (0.39 km)	75 yd (69 m)
EFU	A storm chaser documented a brief landspout tornado in a field. No damage occurred.						
EF0	Rawlinsville	Lancaster	PA	39.8806°N 76.2673°W	21:40–21:41	0.51 mi (0.82 km)	40 yd (37 m)
EF0	A narrow swath of corn was flattened and a tree was snapped. Several other trees had branches snapped off.						
EF1	ENE of Harmony, PA to SW of Deposit, NY	Susquehanna (PA), Broome (NY)	PA, NY	41.9795°N 75.5018°W	22:25–22:35	3.37 mi (5.42 km)	200 yd (180 m)
EF1	Multiple trees were snapped or uprooted in Pennsylvania before the tornado crossed into New York. There, a house had roof shingle damage and broken windows, a shed was moved about 100 ft (30 m), and a couple of small boats were lofted from a pond.						
EF0	SSE of Munnsville	Madison	NY	42.94°N 75.58°W	22:55–22:59	1.47 mi (2.37 km)	175 yd (160 m)
EF0	A weak tornado snapped numerous tree limbs, damaged outbuildings, sheds, and garages, and knocked over a street sign.						
EF1	NE of Vernon Center	Oneida	NY	43.0562°N 75.4648°W	23:10–23:15	1.31 mi (2.11 km)	200 yd (180 m)
EF1	Many trees were snapped or uprooted and an outbuilding was damaged.						
EF1	NNE of Taberg	Oneida	NY	43.33°N 75.59°W	23:17–23:20	1.38 mi (2.22 km)	110 yd (100 m)
EF1	A high-end EF1 tornado snapped numerous trees and damaged the roof of a mobile home.						
EF1	Northeastern Allentown to Northwestern Bethlehem	Lehigh	PA	40.63°N 75.4246°W	23:21–23:23	0.3 mi (0.48 km)	160 yd (150 m)
EF1	A brief tornado touched down in the northeastern part of Allentown and impacted the Midway Manor neighborhood, where multiple homes sustained roof and siding damage, and one house had its porch awning ripped off and thrown 100 ft (30 m). A church also suffered roof damage, along with a nearby shed. Another shed was blown 50 ft (15 m) off its foundation elsewhere. A swing set and some fencing was knocked over, and patio furniture was tossed. The tornado entered the northwestern edge of Bethlehem and caused some additional tree damage before it dissipated						
EFU	ENE of Redfield	Lewis	NY	43.54°N 75.7°W	23:27–23:30	0.85 mi (1.37 km)	100 yd (91 m)
EFU	Sentinel-2 satellite imagery located a path of tornado damage in a heavily wooded area. No ground survey was conducted because of limited access to the area.						
EF0	NE of Kintnersville, PA	Hunterdon	NJ	40.57°N 75.16°W	23:37–23:38	0.52 mi (0.84 km)	150 yd (140 m)
EF0	Two farm outbuildings and some trees were damaged.						
EF3	W of West Leyden to Turin	Lewis	NY	43.46°N 75.51°W	23:42–00:14	16 mi (26 km)	700 yd (640 m)
EF3	At the beginning of the damage path near West Leyden, this strong tornado ripped the roof off of a house and inflicted significant damage to its second-floor exterior walls. Two other homes in this area were also heavily damaged and had their roofs uplifted, and a large garage structure had exterior walls blown out. Numerous large trees were snapped, uprooted, and defoliated in wooded areas, a barn was completely destroyed, and another barn was significantly damaged. The tornado then weakened and tracked through remote swampy terrain with less continuous tree damage, although surveyors had difficulty reaching this area due to a lack of road access. Towards the end of its track in Turin, the tornado intensified again as it struck the Snow Ridge Ski Resort, where all of the chair lift cables failed, some large metal chair lift support structures were toppled over or damaged, and many more trees were snapped and defoliated. Major structural damage occurred at the West Wind Motel, where several buildings had their roofs ripped off or collapsed, and also had some interior walls knocked down. A multi-story building was also shifted off its foundation and was completely unroofed. The tornado then abruptly lifted and dissipated after striking the motel.						

=== August 8 event ===
List of confirmed tornadoes – Tuesday, August 8, 2023
EF#	Location	County / Parish	State	Start Coord.	Time (UTC)	Path length	Max width
EF1	Northern Mattapoisett	Plymouth	MA	41.6808°N 70.8477°W	15:20–15:23	0.9 mi (1.4 km)	300 yd (270 m)
EF1	Numerous trees were snapped and uprooted along the northern outskirts of Mattapoisett.						
EF0	Southwestern Barnstable	Barnstable	MA	41.6751°N 70.3917°W	15:52–15:56	1.2 mi (1.9 km)	650 yd (590 m)
EF0	A tornado uprooted a tree, snapped tree limbs, damaged fences, and downed an electrical pole on the southwest side of Barnstable.						
EF0	WSW of Tuba City	Coconino	AZ	36.02°N 111.39°W	19:50–20:00	4.99 mi (8.03 km)	10 yd (9.1 m)
EF0	A landspout tornado caught on video as it lofted dust in an unpopulated area. No damage occurred.						
EF3	E of Otis to SW of Yuma	Washington, Yuma	CO	40.1455°N 102.9141°W	22:39–23:25	15.65 mi (25.19 km)	212 yd (194 m)
EF3	This strong stovepipe tornado looped over its path multiple times and was well-documented by multiple storm chasers. At the beginning of the path in Washington County, the tornado damaged a detached garage and shifted it off its foundation. A metal shack had tin roofing removed, a tin storage container was flipped, power poles and crops were damaged, and trees were snapped. After crossing into Yuma County and overturning some irrigation pivots, the tornado strengthened and significantly damaged a well-built home, which sustained total destruction of its three-car attached garage, suffered partial roof loss, had doors blown in, and also sustained broken windows. A barn was heavily damaged nearby, and multiple wooden power poles and trees were snapped. The tornado then struck a farm property, where a large and well-built anchored metal outbuilding was completely destroyed and swept off its foundation, leaving behind only a bare concrete slab and a pile of mangled metal beams. A 5,000-pound engine stored inside the building was thrown and never recovered, metal debris was strewn across a nearby field, and farm machinery was damaged. Two metal grain bins were completely swept away nearby, and were ripped away with such force that their round concrete foundation pads were cracked and rebar was bent. The tornado snapped several large power poles, including a very sturdy laminated power pole, before it dissipated just southwest of Yuma. Coupled with the EF3 tornado that occurred in Prowers County on June 23, 2023, this event marked the first time that two F3/EF3+ tornadoes touched down in Colorado in the same year since 1993.						
EFU	N of Broadwater	Morrill	NE	41.7°N 102.84°W	22:50	0.05 mi (0.080 km)	25 yd (23 m)
EFU	A brief tornado was caught on video. No damage occurred						
EFU	SE of Yuma	Yuma	CO	40.0603°N 102.6425°W	23:30–23:46	5.28 mi (8.50 km)	200 yd (180 m)
EFU	A multiple-vortex tornado was observed moving across open land. No damage was reported.						
EF0	S of Yuma	Yuma	CO	39.9045°N 102.716°W	00:04–00:08	1.67 mi (2.69 km)	193 yd (176 m)
EF0	Storm chasers observed a tornado that did damage to corn.						
EFU	NE of Cope	Yuma	CO	39.8553°N 102.6889°W	00:19–00:22	1 mi (1.6 km)	150 yd (140 m)
EFU	Multiple chasers observed a brief rope tornado that remained over an open field and caused no damage.						
EFU	NE of Cope	Yuma	CO	39.8129°N 102.6587°W	00:23–00:32	0.93 mi (1.50 km)	75 yd (69 m)
EFU	This tornado remained over open fields, causing no damage.						
EFU	W of Idalia	Yuma	CO	39.6886°N 102.5101°W	01:00–01:14	0.45 mi (0.72 km)	150 yd (140 m)
EFU	An intermittent tornado remained over an open field, causing no damage.						
EF2	SW of Idalia	Yuma, Kit Carson	CO	39.6139°N 102.3955°W	01:25–01:47	5.29 mi (8.51 km)	150 yd (140 m)
EF2	A strong tornado snapped nine wooden power poles and damaged an irrigation pivot.						
EFU	SSE of Kanorado	Sherman	KS	39.2998°N 102.0227°W	03:17–03:24	1.3 mi (2.1 km)	75 yd (69 m)
EFU	Dead tree limbs were snapped and swirl marks were left in the grass on an abandoned property.						

== Non-tornadic impacts ==
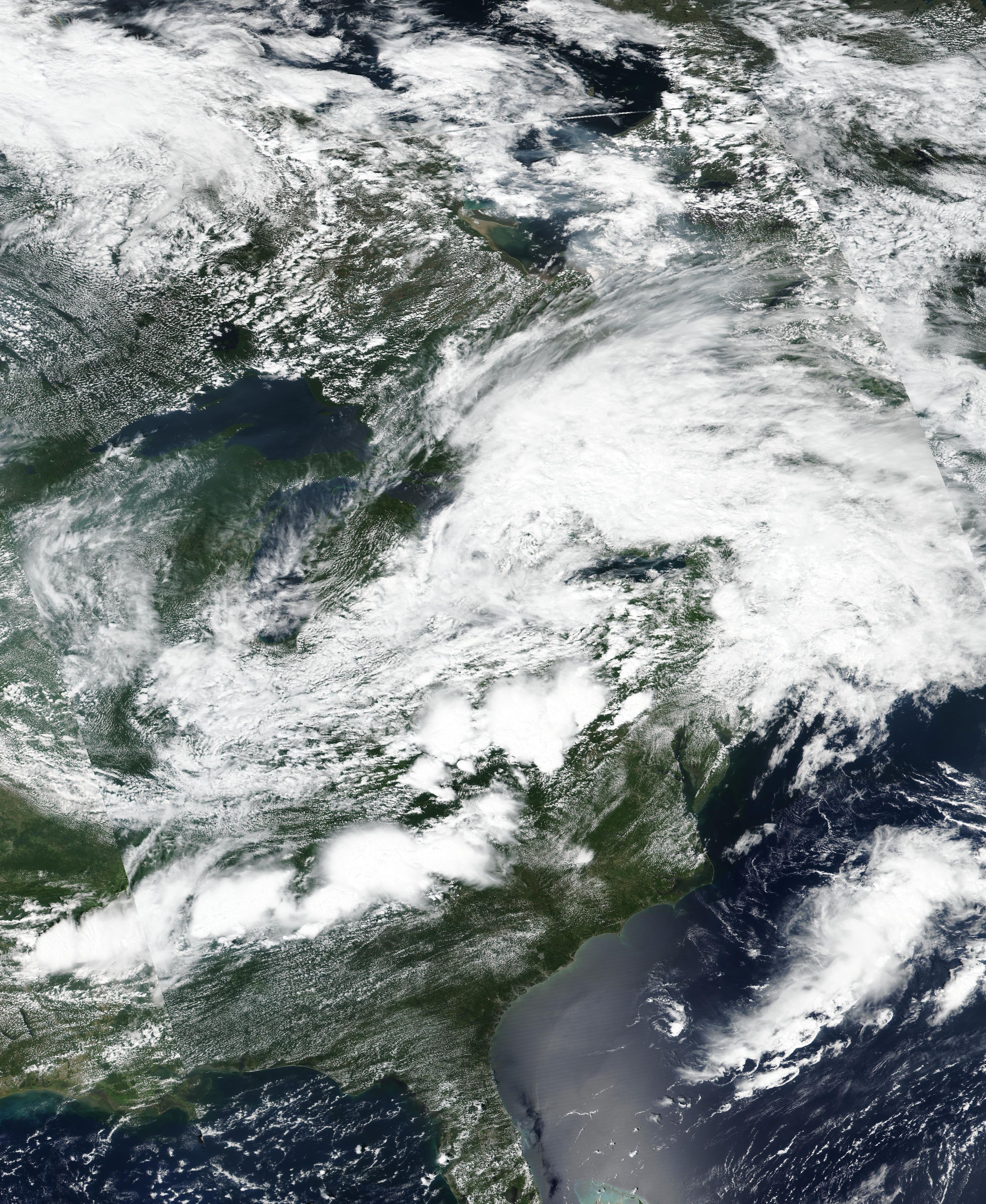
Satellite image of the severe weather system responsible for the tornado outbreak sequence that occurred on August 4–8, 2023.

Over 1,000 preliminary wind reports were recorded as severe.

A Major League Baseball game between the Washington Nationals and the Philadelphia Phillies at Nationals Park was postponed on August 7 due to the inclement weather. The baseball game between the New York Mets and Chicago Cubs saw a 2-hour and 9 minute delay due to the rain at Citi Field. A Carly Rae Jepsen concert at The Rooftop at Pier 17 in New York City was cancelled due to a lightning storm. A 2023 Leagues Cup match between the Philadelphia Union and New York Red Bulls was postponed by a day. Several state governors, including Maryland governor Wes Moore, New York governor Kathy Hochul, and West Virginia governor Jim Justice urged people to stay alert, and to be prepared. Hochul's administration and local officials in New York were on stand-by for clean-up and response efforts, while Justice declared a State of Preparedness for all counties in West Virginia. Schools in Tennessee and Georgia were closed. Tornado watches and warnings were posted across ten states from Tennessee to New York, covering 29.5 million people. U.S. government offices in Washington, D.C. were closed early in anticipation of severe weather. Joe Biden's trip to the western United States was delayed 90 minutes.

A rare flash flood emergency was issued for Cambridge, Maryland, where flood damage and water rescues occurred as 4 inches (100 mm) of rain fell in two hours. Power lines fell in Westminster, Maryland, including on MD 140, trapping more than forty people in their cars after live power lines fell behind and in front of vehicles. Montgomery Parks closed Sligo Creek Parkway and a road because of the threat for flooding, and damaging winds, causing trees to fall. A U.S. District Court sentencing was postponed due to severe weather, and tolls on I-66 reached nearly thirty dollars. Extra trains were operated by the Washington Metro to assist in people to get to their residences, and the Emergency Operations Center was activated. Train stations also operated an extra hour because Beyoncé's tour paid $100,000 to do so for fans to arrive at FedExField in Landover, Maryland, and to help people get home. FedexField was also under a "shelter in place" order due to the imminent severe weather threat, and it was lifted nearly two hours later. Despite the severe weather, a Pink concert was allowed to proceed, but inclement weather forced fans at Nationals Park to remain at the concourse.

Fallen trees trapped hikers and campers at Fall Creek Falls State Park, and forced the park to close. Damage occurred in eastern Kentucky and western North Carolina. Flooding occurred in numerous towns in Massachusetts, including North Andover, Lowell, and Needham. The Knoxville Utilities Board in Knoxville, Tennessee, stated that the damage across eastern Tennessee was "widespread and extensive".

On August 8, additional flash flooding resulted in the Maine Turnpike reducing their speed limit to below 45 miles per hour (72 km/h) south of Falmouth. In Syracuse, New York, record rain of 2.45 in (62 mm) poured down, which resulted in lengthy closures on I-81 and I-690 throughout the day on August 8. More than nine airports issued ground stops, including LaGuardia Airport, Ronald Reagan Washington National Airport, Hartsfield–Jackson Atlanta International Airport, and Baltimore/Washington International Airport. More than 1,700 flights were cancelled and nearly 9,000 were delayed across eastern United States airports impacted by severe weather. At least one million power outages occurred across the eastern United States, and two people were killed.

On August 8, the storms in Colorado produced a 5.25 in (13.3 cm) hailstone in Kirk that became the largest hailstone in state history in terms of diameter.

The American Red Cross were prepared to respond if conditions were necessary.

== See also ==
- Tornadoes of 2023
- Weather of 2023
- List of North American tornadoes and tornado outbreaks
- List of United States tornadoes from July to August 2023
