= Paoli Historic District (Paoli, Indiana) =

Historic district in Indiana, United States

- U.S. National Register of Historic Places
- U.S. Historic district
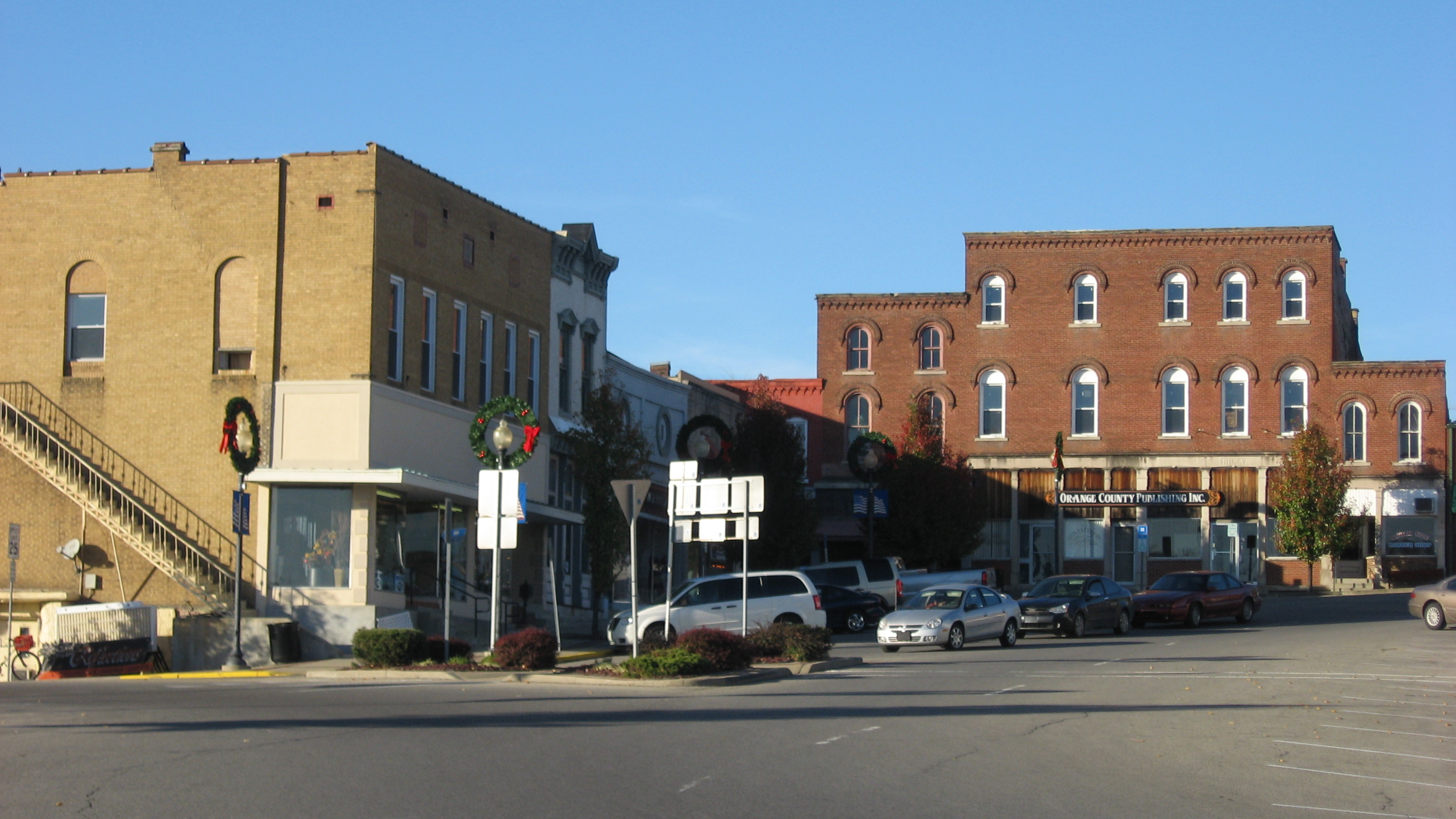
- Paoli Historic District, November 2011

- Location within Indiana Location within the United States
- Location: Roughly bounded by W. Fifth, Railroad and NE. Third Sts. and Lick Cr., Paoli, Indiana
- Coordinates: 38°33′22″N 86°28′08″W
- Area: 65 acres (26 ha)
- Architect: Harmon, William Watson; Pugh, Hugh
- Architectural style: Italianate, Queen Anne, Greek Revival
- NRHP reference No.: 94001355
- Added to NRHP: November 25, 1994

Paoli Historic District is a national historic district located at Paoli, Indiana. The district encompasses 144 contributing buildings, 1 contributing site, 4 contributing structures, and 4 contributing objects in the central business district and surrounding residential sections of Paoli. It developed between about 1840 and 1940, and includes notable examples of Greek Revival, Italianate, and Queen Anne style architecture. Located in the district are the separately listed Thomas Newby Braxtan House and Orange County Courthouse. Other notable contributing resources include Lithia Springs Park, Dr. J.H. Sherrod House (1885), Gabbert House (c. 1870), Lithia Water Bottling Plant (1920), Orange County Jail (1858), U.S. Post Office (1937), Presbyterian Church (1920), Methodist Episcopal Church (1888), Braxtan Store (late 1890s), Riley Building (1887), Paoli State Bank (1912), and Thomas Volney Thornton House (1846).

It was listed on the National Register of Historic Places in 1994.
