= Paoli Historic District =

Paoli Historic District may refer to:

- Paoli Historic District (Paoli, Georgia), listed on the National Register of Historic Places in Madison County, Georgia
- Paoli Historic District (Paoli, Indiana), listed on the National Register of Historic Places in Orange County, Indiana
