= Baring, Missouri =

- City
- Location of Baring, Missouri
- Coordinates: 40°14′38″N 92°12′24″W
- Country: United States
- State: Missouri
- County: Knox

Area
  - Total: 0.13 sq mi (0.33 km^{2})
  - Land: 0.13 sq mi (0.33 km^{2})
  - Water: 0 sq mi (0.00 km^{2})
- Elevation: 817 ft (249 m)

Population (2020)
  - Total: 125
  - Density: 982.5/sq mi (379.36/km^{2})
- Time zone: UTC-6 (Central (CST))
  - Summer (DST): UTC-5 (CDT)
- ZIP code: 63531
- Area code: 660
- FIPS code: 29-03322
- GNIS feature ID: 0713640

Baring is a city in northern Knox County, Missouri, United States. As of the 2020 census, its population is 125.

Baring is located on the Burlington Northern and Santa Fe railroad's mainline between Chicago and Los Angeles, which can carry heavy mixed freight and intermodal traffic, as well as Amtrak's Southwest Chief passenger train.

== History ==
Baring was platted in 1888 when the Atchison, Topeka and Santa Fe Railway was extended to that point. The community was named for the Baring Brothers & Co., investors in the railroad. A post office has been in operation at Baring since 1888.

On the evening of August 4, 2023, an EF2 tornado struck Baring, badly damaging homes and businesses.

== Geography ==
Baring is located at 40°14′38″N 92°12′24″W (40.248973, -92.206619).

According to the United States Census Bureau, the city has a total area of 0.13 square miles (0.34 km^{2}), all land.

== Demographics ==
Historical population
Census	Pop.	Note	%±
1890	266		—
1900	241		−9.4%
1910	379		57.3%
1920	248		−34.6%
1930	329		32.7%
1940	259		−21.3%
1950	274		5.8%
1960	213		−22.3%
1970	206		−3.3%
1980	206		0.0%
1990	182		−11.7%
2000	159		−12.6%
2010	132		−17.0%
2020	125		−5.3%
U.S. Decennial Census

=== 2010 census ===
At the 2010 census, there were 132 people, 63 households and 36 families residing in the city. The population density was 1,015.4 inhabitants per square mile (392.0/km^{2}). There were 82 housing units at an average density of 630.8 per square mile (243.6/km^{2}). The racial makeup of the city was 100.0% White.

There were 63 households, of which 22.2% had children under the age of 18 living with them, 36.5% were married couples living together, 12.7% had a female householder with no husband present, 7.9% had a male householder with no wife present, and 42.9% were non-families. 39.7% of all households were made up of individuals, and 22.3% had someone living alone who was 65 years of age or older. The average household size was 2.10 and the average family size was 2.78.

The median age in the city was 41.7 years. 21.2% of residents were under the age of 18; 11.3% were between the ages of 18 and 24; 21.2% were from 25 to 44; 26.5% were from 45 to 64; and 19.7% were 65 years of age or older. The gender makeup of the city was 43.2% male and 56.8% female.

=== 2000 census ===
At the 2000 census, there were 159 people, 65 households and 41 families residing in the city. The population density was 1,254.6 inhabitants per square mile (484.4/km^{2}). There were 80 housing units at an average density of 631.2 per square mile (243.7/km^{2}). The racial makeup of the city was 100.00% White. Hispanic or Latino of any race were 0.63% of the population.

There were 65 households, of which 29.2% had children under the age of 18 living with them, 52.3% were married couples living together, 12.3% had a female householder with no husband present, and 35.4% were non-families. 30.8% of all households were made up of individuals, and 15.4% had someone living alone who was 65 years of age or older. The average household size was 2.45 and the average family size was 3.14.

28.3% of the population were under the age of 18, 6.9% from 18 to 24, 20.8% from 25 to 44, 25.2% from 45 to 64, and 18.9% who were 65 years of age or older. The median age was 40 years. For every 100 females, there were 82.8 males. For every 100 females age 18 and over, there were 78.1 males.

The median household income was $27,500 and the median family income was $32,500. Males had a median income of $25,000 compared with $23,750 for females. The per capita income for the city was $11,980. About 8.3% of families and 14.1% of the population were below the poverty line, including 22.7% of those under the age of eighteen and 10.3% of those 65 or over.

== Education ==
It is in the Knox County R-I School District.
