= Evangelische Lutherische Emanuels Kirche =

Historic church in Indiana, United States

- U.S. National Register of Historic Places
- U.S. Historic district
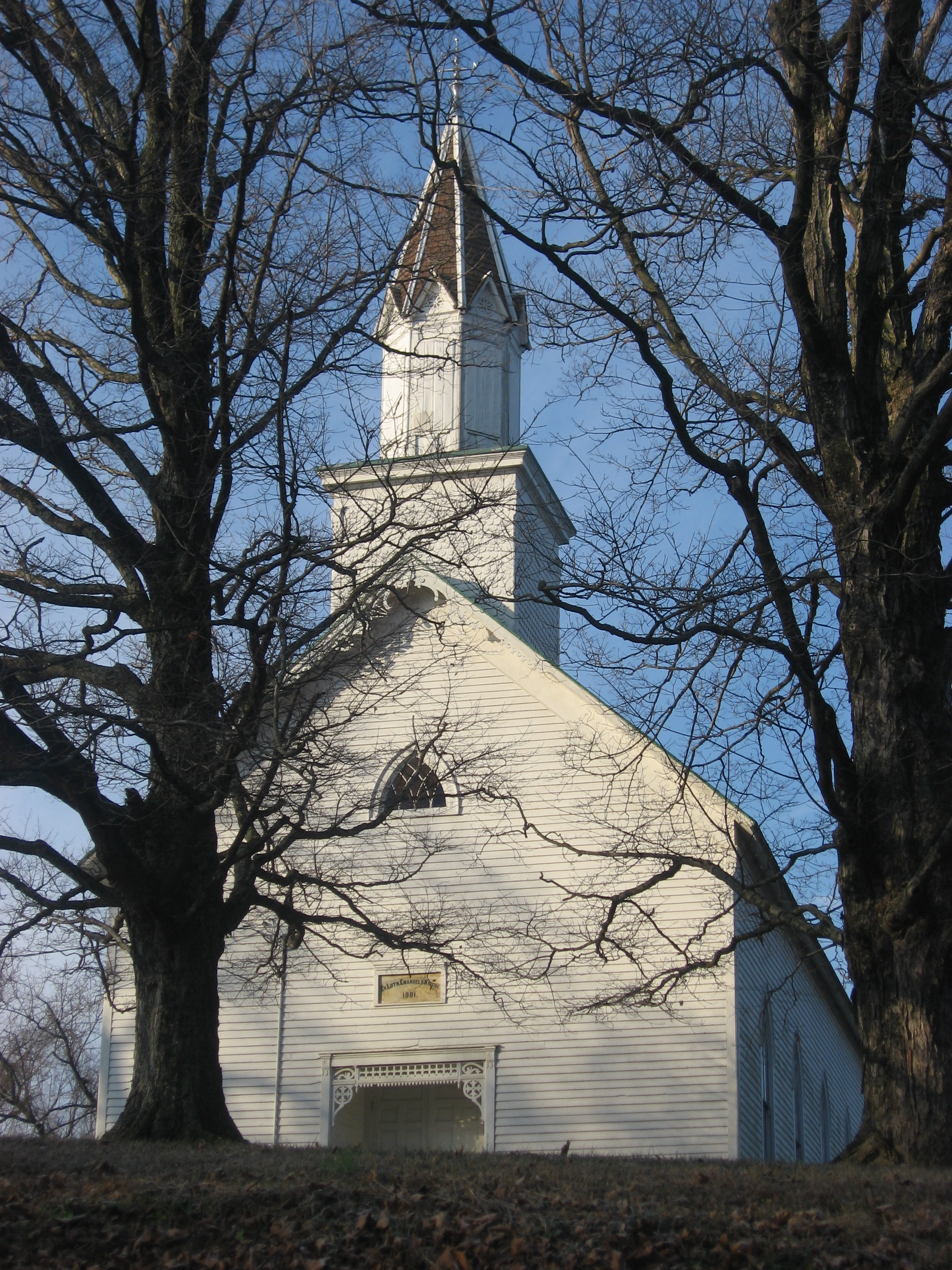

- Location within Indiana Location within the United States
- Location: County Road 445E, 1 mile south of State Road 56 and northwest of Dubois, Harbison Township, Dubois County, Indiana
- Coordinates: 38°27′59″N 86°49′23″W
- Area: 9.2 acres (3.7 ha)
- Built: 1901
- Architectural style: Italianate, High Victorian Gothic
- NRHP reference No.: 90000329
- Added to NRHP: February 23, 1990

Evangelische Lutherische Emanuels Kirche, also known as Emmanuel Evangelical Lutheran Church and Hill Church, is a historic Lutheran church complex and national historic district located near Dubois in Harbison Township, Dubois County, Indiana. The main church was built in 1901, and is a one-story, rectangular High Victorian Gothic style frame building. It has a front gable roof and rests on a stone foundation. It features a large steeple structure consisting of a square tower, octagonal drum, and spire. Also on the property are the contributing cemetery, schoolhouse (1889), and parsonage (1891).

== History ==
The church was built in 1901 following a large number of German immigrants to the United States and the Indiana area during the 1800s. The congregation itself was formed in 1859 and initially based in a schoolhouse that they had bought from Dubois County to allow for education of their youth in German. When schooling was formalised in Indiana under the state, the schoolhouse began to be used as a church school and also place of worship. In 1863, a church was erected but this was replaced when Evangelische Lutherische Emanuels Kirche was constructed in 1901. The church was built in Late Victorian Gothic style rather than Germanic.

The church closed for Christian worship in 1971, though it remained maintained as part of a cemetery association. It was added to the National Register of Historic Places in 1990. It remained consecrated in the Lutheran tradition and still opens for occasional events. It holds an annual reunion that is open to the public.

== Gallery ==
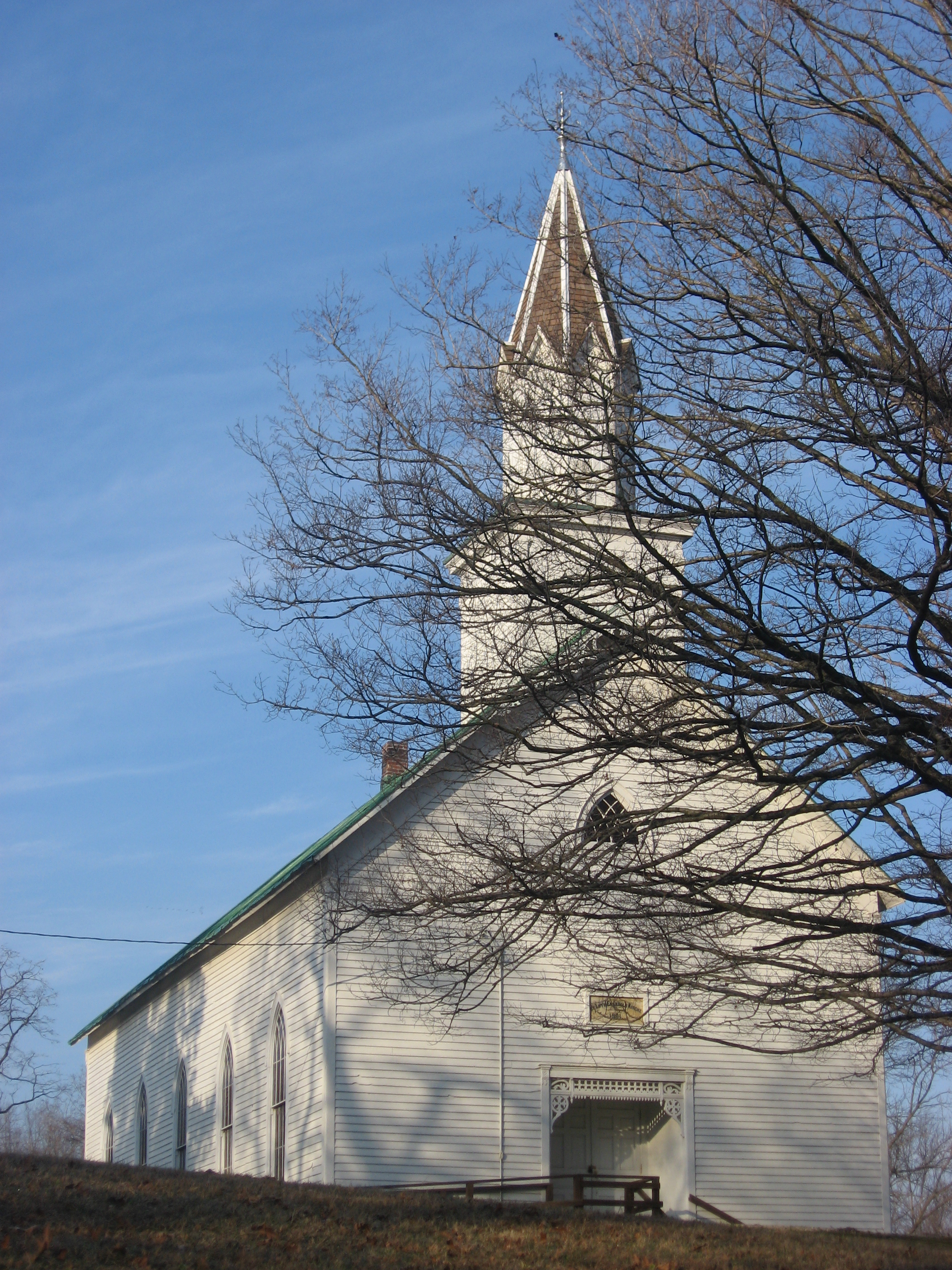
Front view

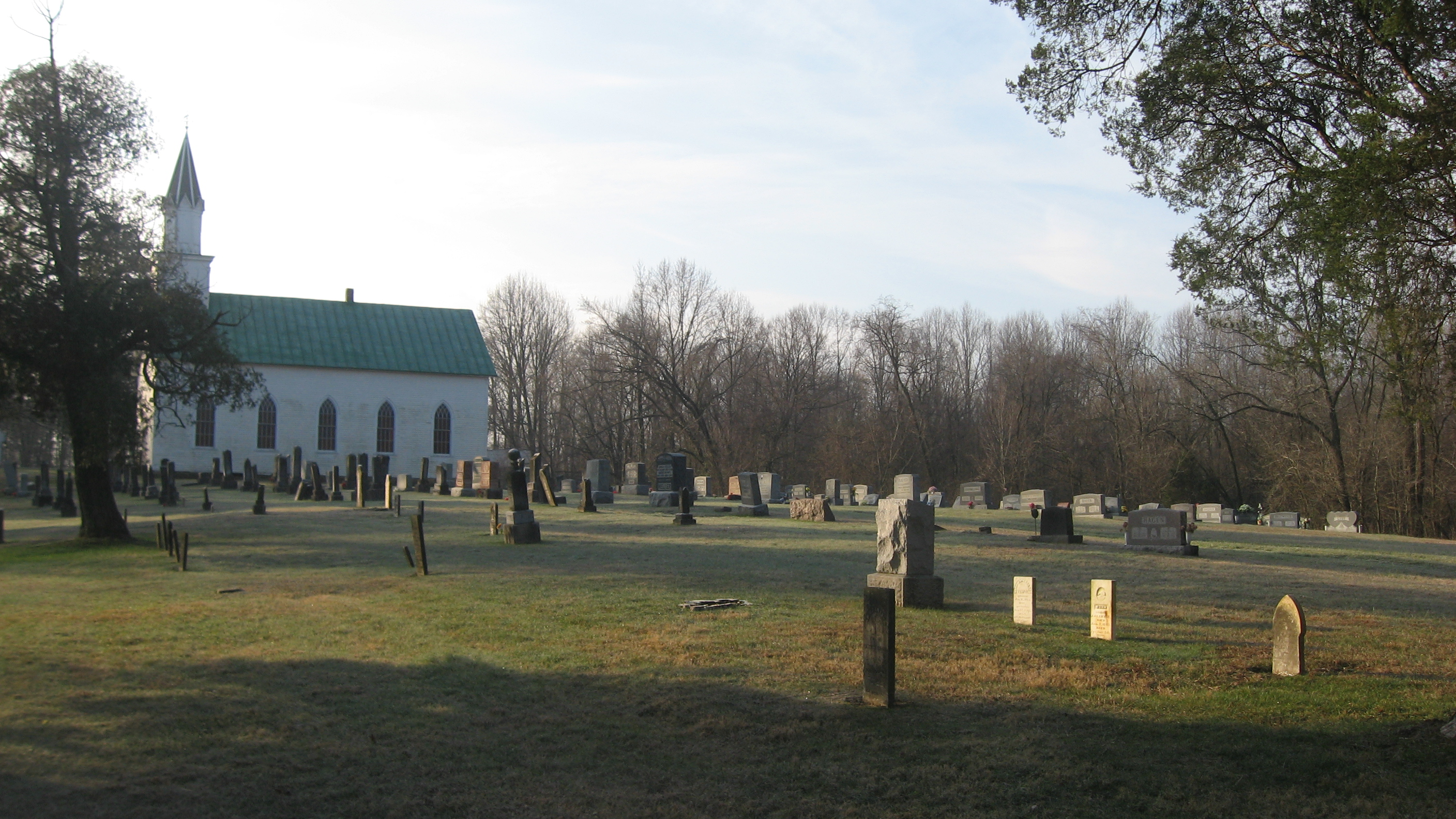
View of the cemetery
