= Pawnee, Illinois =

Pawnee
- Village
- Location of Pawnee in Sangamon County, Illinois.
- Coordinates: 39°35′37″N 89°35′05″W
- Country: United States
- State: Illinois
- County: Sangamon

Government
  - Body: Board of Trustees of the Village of Pawnee

Area
  - Total: 1.33 sq mi (3.45 km^{2})
  - Land: 1.33 sq mi (3.45 km^{2})
  - Water: 0 sq mi (0.00 km^{2})
- Elevation: 607 ft (185 m)

Population (2020)
  - Total: 2,678
  - Density: 2,010.7/sq mi (776.33/km^{2})
- Time zone: UTC-6 (CST)
  - Summer (DST): UTC-5 (CDT)
- ZIP code: 62558
- Area code: 217
- FIPS code: 17-58174
- GNIS feature ID: 2399635
- Website: www.pawneeil.net

Pawnee is a village in Sangamon County, Illinois, United States. As of the 2020 census, Pawnee had a population of 2,678. It is part of the Springfield, Illinois, Metropolitan Statistical Area.

== History ==
The community is named after the Pawnee Tribe.

On October 13, 1902, the Victor Mine exploded killing six workers. Press reports indicate an explosive charge ignited coal dust in the shaft.

On August 6, 2023, a large and long-tracked EF2 tornado hit north of Pawnee, Illinois destroying houses and businesses.

== Geography ==
According to the 2010 census, Pawnee has a total area of 1.26 square miles (3.26 km^{2}), all land.

== Demographics ==
Historical population
Census	Pop.	Note	%±
1880	192		—
1900	595		—
1910	1,399		135.1%
1920	1,200		−14.2%
1930	959		−20.1%
1940	1,006		4.9%
1950	974		−3.2%
1960	1,517		55.7%
1970	1,936		27.6%
1980	2,577		33.1%
1990	2,384		−7.5%
2000	2,647		11.0%
2010	2,739		3.5%
2020	2,678		−2.2%
U.S. Decennial Census

=== 2020 census ===
As of the 2020 census, Pawnee had a population of 2,678. The median age was 39.3 years. 23.3% of residents were under the age of 18 and 16.1% of residents were 65 years of age or older. For every 100 females there were 98.1 males, and for every 100 females age 18 and over there were 96.6 males age 18 and over.

0.0% of residents lived in urban areas, while 100.0% lived in rural areas.

There were 1,078 households in Pawnee, of which 32.7% had children under the age of 18 living in them. Of all households, 53.7% were married-couple households, 16.1% were households with a male householder and no spouse or partner present, and 22.8% were households with a female householder and no spouse or partner present. About 23.3% of all households were made up of individuals and 11.2% had someone living alone who was 65 years of age or older.

There were 1,168 housing units, of which 7.7% were vacant. The homeowner vacancy rate was 1.7% and the rental vacancy rate was 8.6%.

Racial composition as of the 2020 census
Race	Number	Percent
White	2,513	93.8%
Black or African American	24	0.9%
American Indian and Alaska Native	1	0.0%
Asian	8	0.3%
Native Hawaiian and Other Pacific Islander	0	0.0%
Some other race	20	0.7%
Two or more races	112	4.2%
Hispanic or Latino (of any race)	30	1.1%

=== 2000 census ===
At the 2000 census there were 2,647 people, 1,028 households, and 747 families in the village. The population density was 2,221.0 inhabitants per square mile (857.5/km^{2}). There were 1,086 housing units at an average density of 911.2 per square mile (351.8/km^{2}). The racial makeup of the village was 98.83% White, 0.15% African American, 0.11% Native American, 0.19% Asian, 0.04% from other races, and 0.68% from two or more races. Hispanic or Latino of any race were 0.30%.

Of the 1,028 households 40.0% had children under the age of 18 living with them, 59.0% were married couples living together, 10.6% had a female householder with no husband present, and 27.3% were non-families. 23.4% of households were one person and 12.5% were one person aged 65 or older. The average household size was 2.57 and the average family size was 3.06.

The age distribution was 28.1% under the age of 18, 6.8% from 18 to 24, 31.8% from 25 to 44, 21.7% from 45 to 64, and 11.5% 65 or older. The median age was 35 years. For every 100 females, there were 92.8 males. For every 100 females age 18 and over, there were 85.6 males.

The median household income was $50,787 and the median family income was $54,736. Males had a median income of $37,171 versus $26,304 for females. The per capita income for the village was $21,599. About 5.9% of families and 6.3% of the population were below the poverty line, including 7.6% of those under age 18 and 8.5% of those age 65 or over.
