= Harbison Township, Dubois County, Indiana =

Harbison Township
- Township
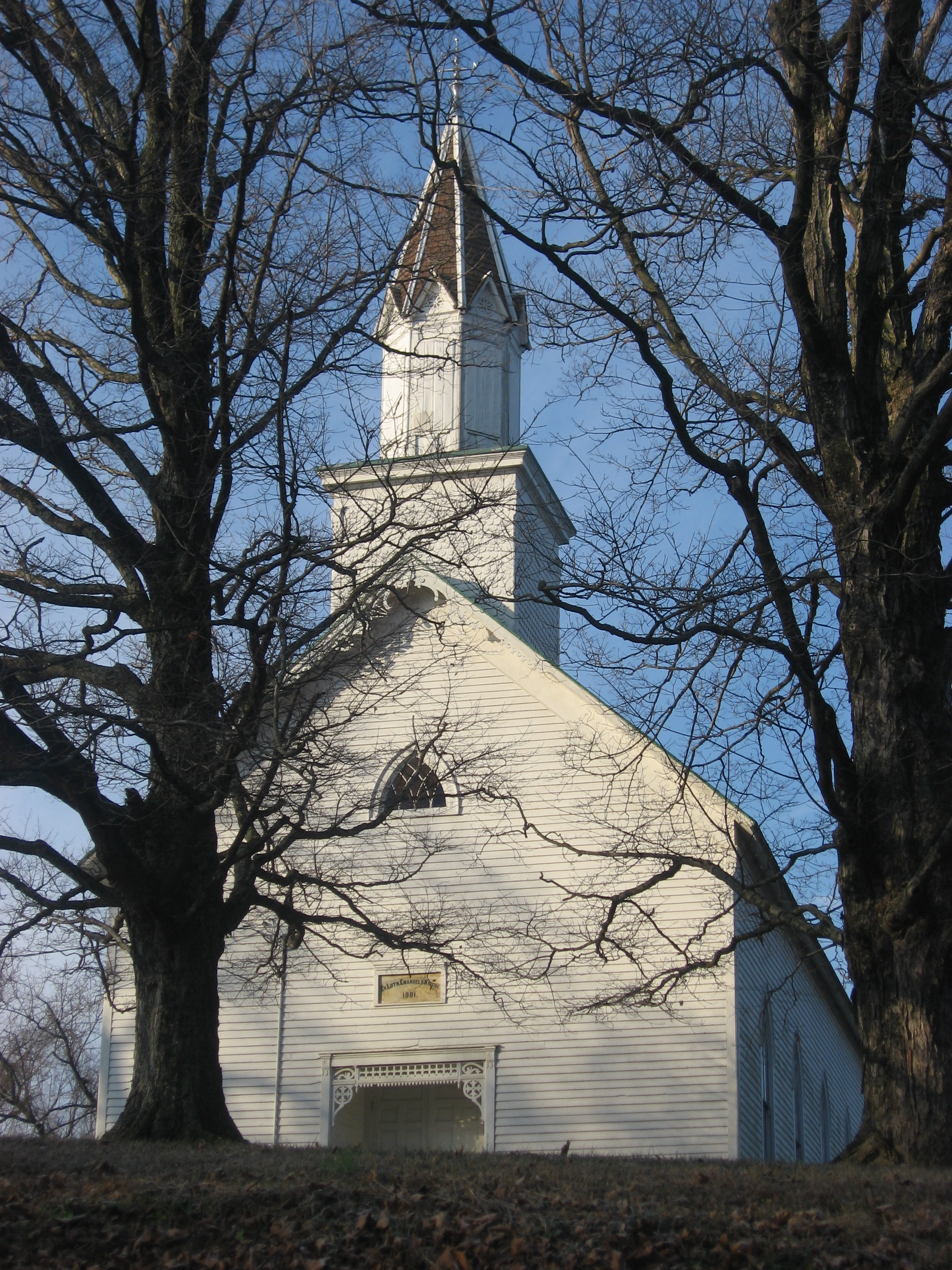
- Evangelische Lutherische Emanuels Kirche, a historic site in the township

- Location of Harbison Township in Dubois County
- Coordinates: 38°28′15″N 86°51′30″W
- Country: United States
- State: Indiana
- County: Dubois

Government
  - Type: Indiana township

Area
  - Total: 38.21 sq mi (99.0 km^{2})
  - Land: 37.55 sq mi (97.3 km^{2})
  - Water: 0.66 sq mi (1.7 km^{2})
- Elevation: 535 ft (163 m)

Population (2020)
  - Total: 1,585
  - Density: 42.3/sq mi (16.3/km^{2})
- FIPS code: 18-31324
- GNIS feature ID: 453373

Harbison Township is one of twelve townships in Dubois County, Indiana. As of the 2010 census, its population was 1,588 and it contained 690 housing units.

== History ==
Harbison Township was named for Arthur Harbison, a pioneer settler and judge.

The Evangelische Lutherische Emanuels Kirche was listed on the National Register of Historic Places in 1990.

== Geography ==
According to the 2010 census, the township has a total area of 38.21 square miles (99.0 km^{2}), of which 37.55 square miles (97.3 km^{2}) (or 98.27%) is land and 0.66 square miles (1.7 km^{2}) (or 1.73%) is water.

=== Unincorporated towns ===
- Dubois (part)
- Dubois Crossroads
- Haysville
- Kellerville

(This list is based on USGS data and may include former settlements.)

=== Adjacent townships ===
- Rutherford Township, Martin County (north)
- Lost River Township, Martin County (northeast)
- Columbia Township (east)
- Marion Township (south)
- Bainbridge Township (southwest)
- Boone Township (west)
- Reeve Township, Daviess County (northwest)

=== Major highways ===
- U.S. Route 231
- Indiana State Road 56

=== Cemeteries ===
The township contains ten cemeteries: Cavender, Chattin, Cooper, Ewing, Gwin, Harbison, Hardin, Hope, Mount Zion and Reed.

== Education ==
Harbison Township is in Northeast Dubois County School Corporation. The comprehensive high school of that school district is Northeast Dubois High School.

In 1948 Harbison and Marion townships were planning a joint high school.
