= Sangchris Lake State Recreation Area =

State park in Illinois, United States

- IUCN category V (protected landscape/seascape)
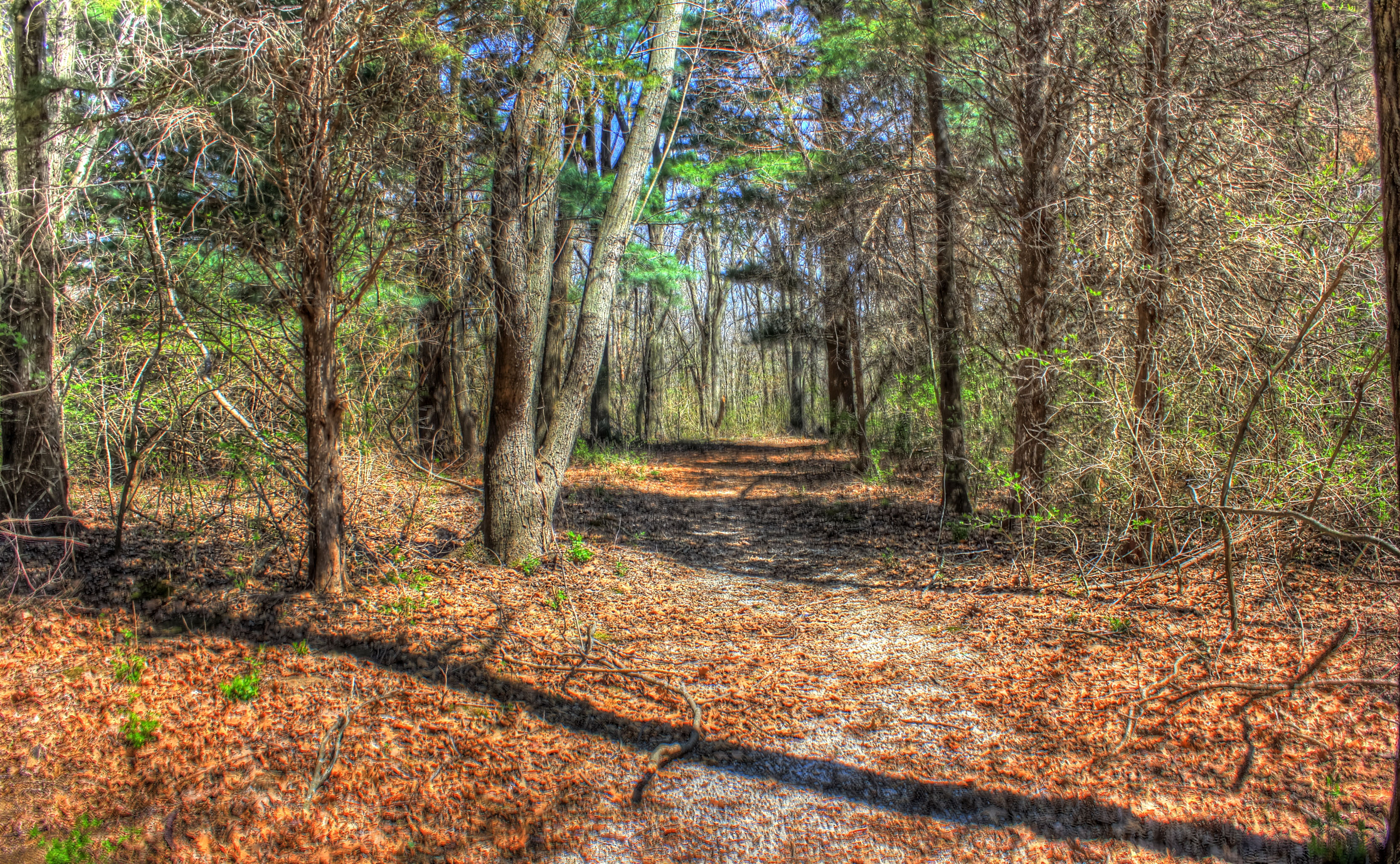
- A hiking trail at Sangchris Lake State Recreation Area

- Location within Illinois Location within the United States
- Location: Christian and Sangamon Counties, Illinois, USA
- Nearest city: Rochester, Illinois
- Coordinates: 39°39′03″N 89°28′21″W
- Area: 3,022 acres (1,223 ha)
- Established: 1964
- Governing body: Illinois Department of Natural Resources

Sangchris Lake State Recreation Area is an Illinois state park on 3,022 acres (1,223 ha) in Christian and Sangamon Counties, Illinois, United States. The Sangchris Lake makes up a large portion of this state park.
