= Kincaid Generating Station =

Coal-fired power plant in Illinois

- Country: USA
- Location: Christian County, Illinois
- Coordinates: 39°35′31″N 89°29′49″W
- Construction began: June 1967
- Construction cost: $100 million
- Owner: Vistra

Thermal power station
- Primary fuel: Coal

Power generation
- Annual net output: 1319 Mw

The Kincaid Generating Station is a 1,319-megawatt Illinois coal-fired power plant located in Christian County. It is located on one of the southern arms of Sangchris Lake, which serves as the plant's cooling pond. It is owned and operated by the private-sector holding company Vistra. The plant is adjacent to an Illinois and Midland Railroad line, which delivers the coal that it burns.

== History ==
Kincaid was commissioned by Commonwealth Edison in 1967 as a thermal generator of baseload electricity. The cost of building the plant was $100 million. The first unit, originally nameplated at 625 MW, began generating revenue power in June 1967; a parallel second unit went online in June 1968. The plant was originally designed to burn Illinois coal. Due to enactment of the U.S. federal Clean Air Act the plant, in 1995, the plant switched over to sub-bituminous, low-sulfur coal mined in the Powder River Basin in eastern Wyoming.
