= Kellerville, Indiana =

- Unincorporated community
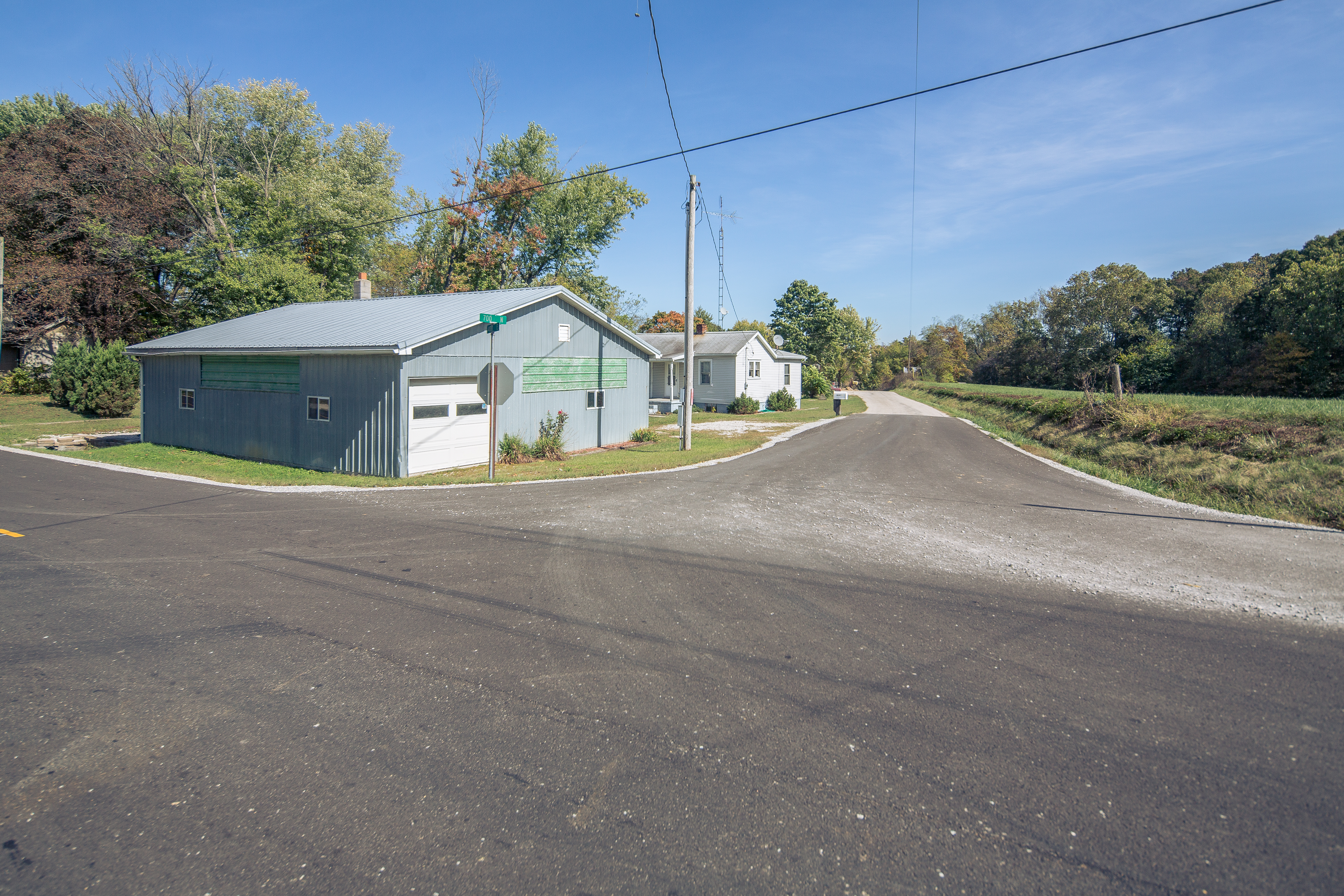

- Location within Indiana Location within the United States
- Coordinates: 38°28′54″N 86°49′54″W
- Country: United States
- State: Indiana
- County: Dubois
- Township: Harbison
- Elevation: 617 ft (188 m)
- Time zone: UTC-5 (Eastern (EST))
  - Summer (DST): UTC-4 (EDT)
- ZIP code: 47527
- Area codes: 812, 930
- FIPS code: 18-39294
- GNIS feature ID: 437213

Kellerville is an unincorporated community in Harbison Township, Dubois County, in the U.S. state of Indiana.

== History ==
Kellerville was named for its founder, John Keller. An old variant name of the community was called Ludlow.

A post office was established under the name Ludlow in 1851, was renamed Kellerville in 1870, and remained in operation until it was discontinued in 1931.
