= Thomas Newby Braxtan House =

Historic house in Indiana, United States

- U.S. National Register of Historic Places
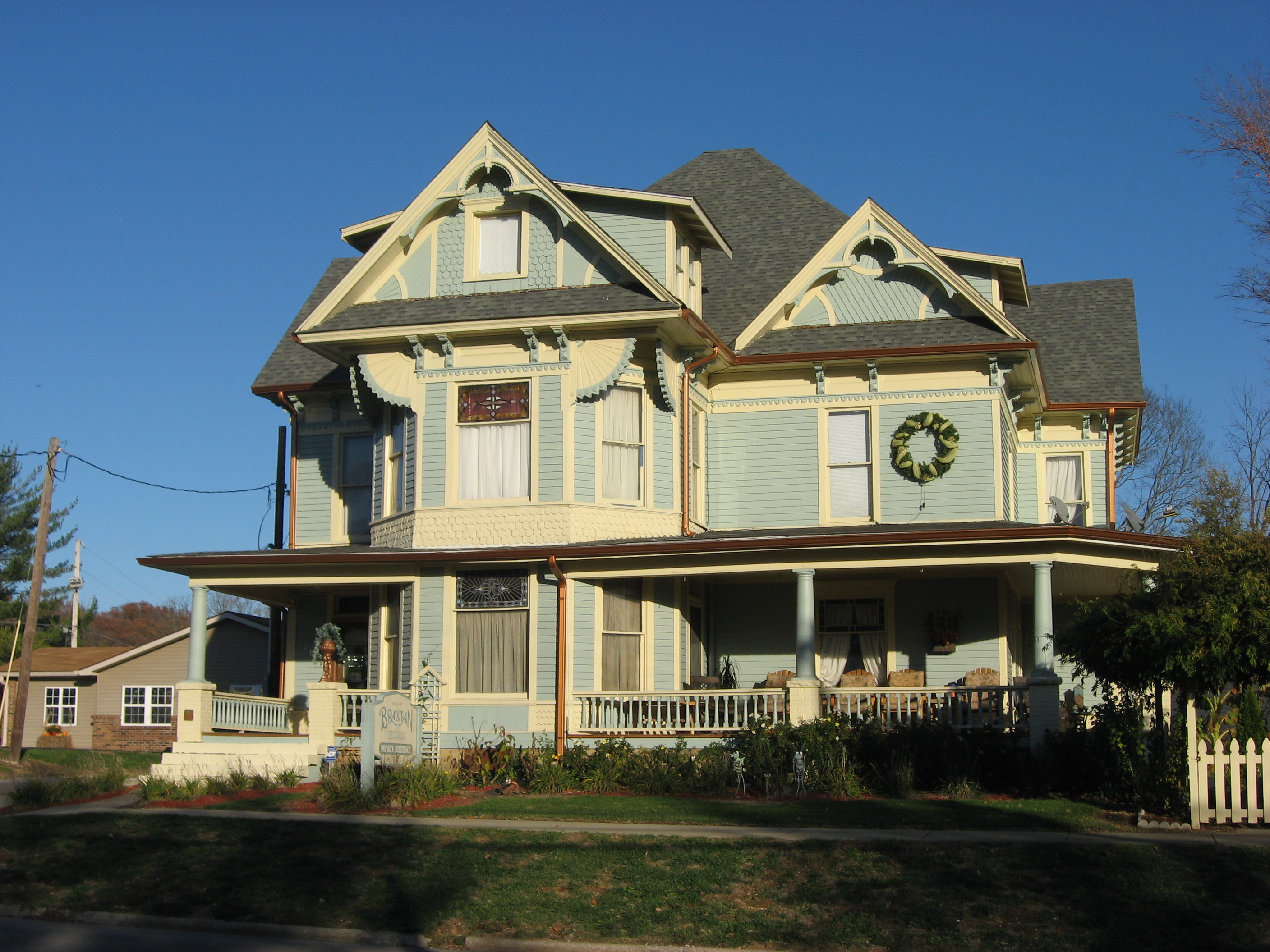
- Thomas Newby Braxtan House, November 2011

- Location within Indiana Location within the United States
- Location: 210 N. Gospel St., Paoli, Indiana
- Coordinates: 38°33′28″N 86°28′5″W
- Area: less than one acre
- Built: 1893
- Architect: McVey, Ben
- Architectural style: Classical Revival, Queen Anne
- NRHP reference No.: 89000777
- Added to NRHP: June 29, 1989

Thomas Newby Braxtan House, also known as the Braxtan Inn, is a historic home located at Paoli, Indiana. It was built in 1893, and is a 2 1/2-story, Queen Anne style frame dwelling. It sits on a sandstone foundation and has a semi-octagonal gabled projection. It features wooden ornamentation including fishscale shingles, fan-shaped corner braces, and turned posts on the rear porch. The house was first used as a hotel / boarding house in 1924, and continues as a bed and breakfast.

It was listed on the National Register of Historic Places in 1989.
