= Kincaid, Illinois =

Kincaid
- Village
- Location of Kincaid in Christian County, Illinois.
- Coordinates: 39°35′13″N 89°24′59″W
- Country: United States
- State: Illinois
- County: Christian

Government
  - Village president: David Oller

Area
  - Total: 0.82 sq mi (2.12 km^{2})
  - Land: 0.82 sq mi (2.12 km^{2})
  - Water: 0 sq mi (0.00 km^{2})
- Elevation: 600 ft (180 m)

Population (2020)
  - Total: 1,349
  - Density: 1,651.9/sq mi (637.81/km^{2})
- Time zone: UTC-6 (CST)
  - Summer (DST): UTC-5 (CDT)
- ZIP code: 62540
- Area code: 217
- FIPS code: 17-39909
- GNIS ID: 2398347
- Website: https://www.villageofkincaid.com/

Kincaid is a village in Christian County, Illinois. The population was 1,349 at the 2020 census.

== Geography ==
According to the 2021 census gazetteer files, Kincaid has a total area of 0.82 square miles (2.12 km^{2}), all land. The village is located near Sangchris Lake.

== Demographics ==
Historical population
Census	Pop.	Note	%±
1920	1,453		—
1930	1,583		8.9%
1940	1,749		10.5%
1950	1,793		2.5%
1960	1,544		−13.9%
1970	1,424		−7.8%
1980	1,591		11.7%
1990	1,353		−15.0%
2000	1,441		6.5%
2010	1,505		4.4%
2020	1,349		−10.4%
U.S. Decennial Census

=== 2020 census ===
As of the 2020 census, Kincaid had a population of 1,349, with 624 households and 383 families residing in the village. The population density was 1,651.16 inhabitants per square mile (637.52/km^{2}). There were 691 housing units at an average density of 845.78 per square mile (326.56/km^{2}).

The median age was 42.5 years. 20.0% of residents were under the age of 18 and 19.7% were 65 years of age or older. For every 100 females, there were 92.4 males, and for every 100 females age 18 and over, there were 93.0 males.

0.0% of residents lived in urban areas, while 100.0% lived in rural areas.

Of the 624 households, 25.5% had children under the age of 18 living in them. Of all households, 38.0% were married-couple households, 22.3% were households with a male householder and no spouse or partner present, and 29.2% were households with a female householder and no spouse or partner present. About 35.0% of all households were made up of individuals, and 15.5% had someone living alone who was 65 years of age or older.

Of the 691 housing units, 9.7% were vacant. The homeowner vacancy rate was 2.5%, and the rental vacancy rate was 10.6%.

Racial composition as of the 2020 census
Race	Number	Percent
White	1,274	94.4%
Black or African American	8	0.6%
American Indian and Alaska Native	3	0.2%
Asian	1	0.1%
Native Hawaiian and Other Pacific Islander	0	0.0%
Some other race	3	0.2%
Two or more races	60	4.4%
Hispanic or Latino (of any race)	10	0.7%

=== Income and poverty ===
The median income for a household in the village was $57,139, and the median income for a family was $82,250. Males had a median income of $53,194 versus $31,250 for females. The per capita income for the village was $34,174. About 5.5% of families and 13.5% of the population were below the poverty line, including 20.5% of those under age 18 and 19.7% of those age 65 or over.

== Notable people ==
- Chuck Boerio, linebacker for the Green Bay Packers; born in Kincaid
- Larry Bucshon, congressman from Indiana (IN-8); grew up in Kincaid
- Harry Chiti, catcher for various teams; born in Kincaid
