= Dubois Crossroads, Indiana =

Dubois Crossroads
- Unincorporated community
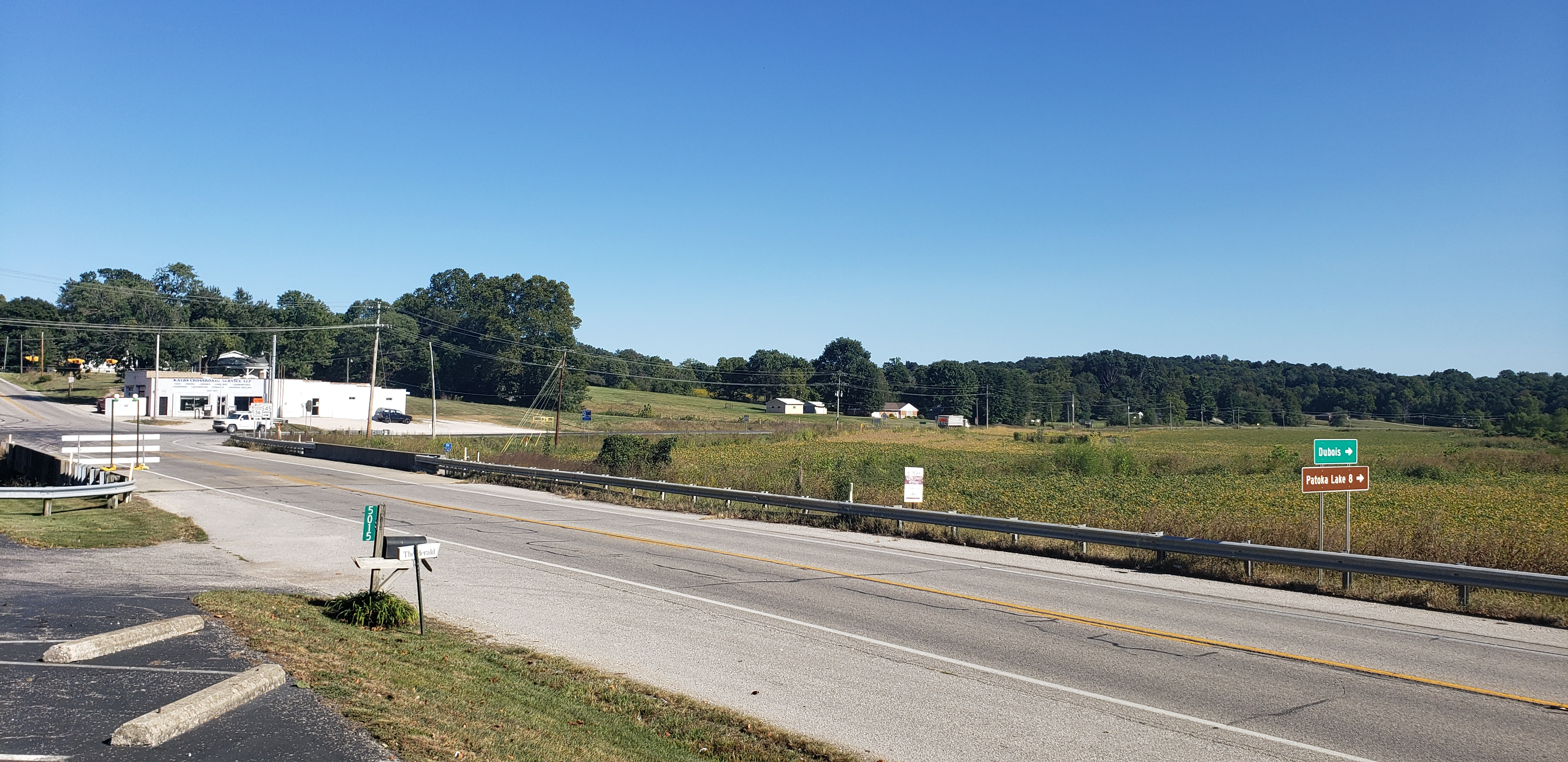
- Landscape of Dubois Crossroads

- Location within Indiana Location within the United States
- Coordinates: 38°28′52″N 86°48′43″W
- Country: United States
- State: Indiana
- County: Dubois
- Township: Harbison
- Elevation: 509 ft (155 m)
- Time zone: UTC-5 (Eastern (EST))
  - Summer (DST): UTC-4 (EDT)
- ZIP code: 47527
- Area code: 812
- FIPS code: 18-18802
- GNIS feature ID: 433738

Dubois Crossroads is an unincorporated community in Harbison Township, Dubois County, in the U.S. state of Indiana.

== History ==
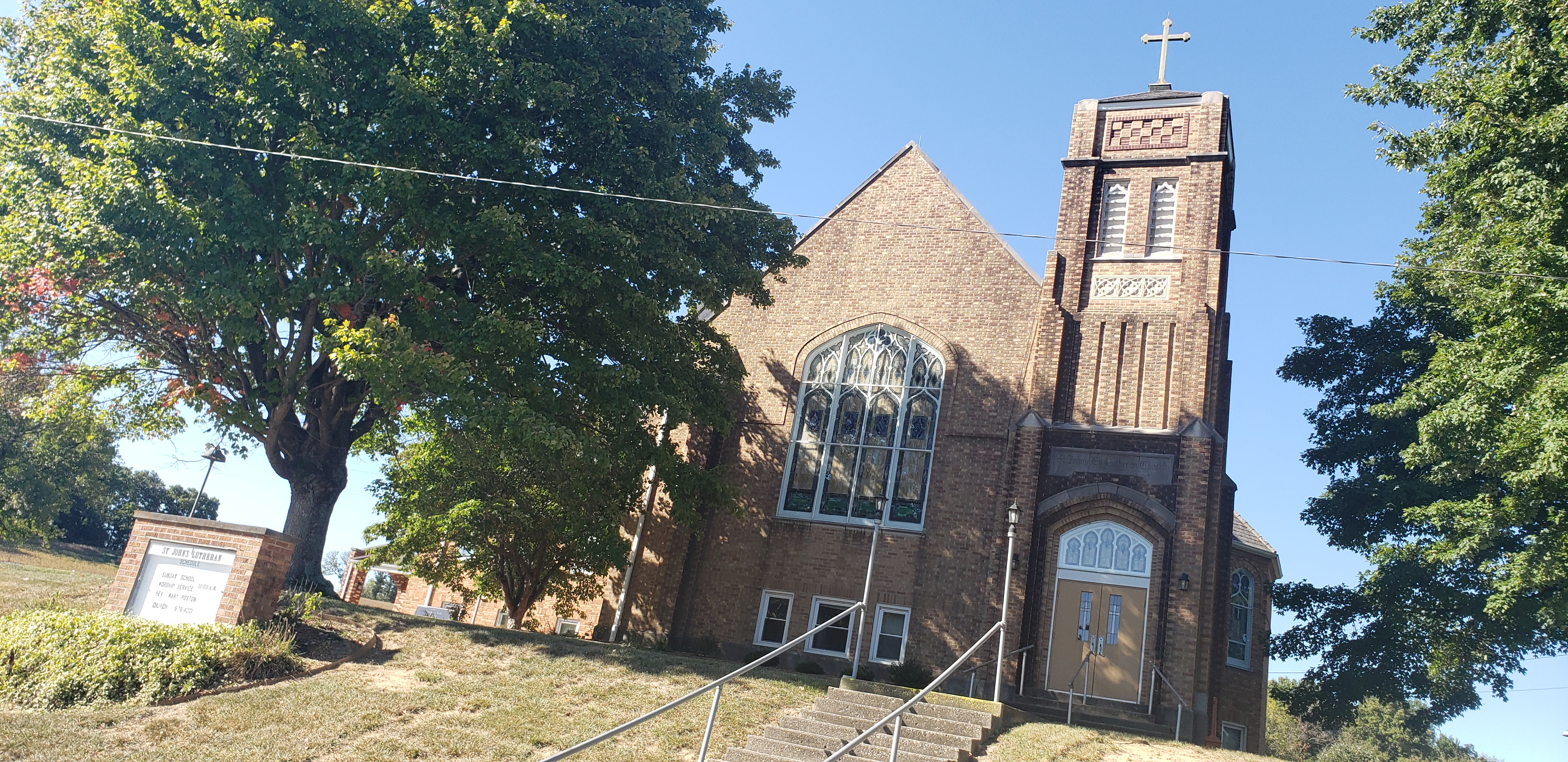
St. John's Lutheran Church in Dubois Crossroads

Dubois Crossroads had its start in the 1920s when a filling station opened at the intersection.
