= Paoli, Indiana =

- Town
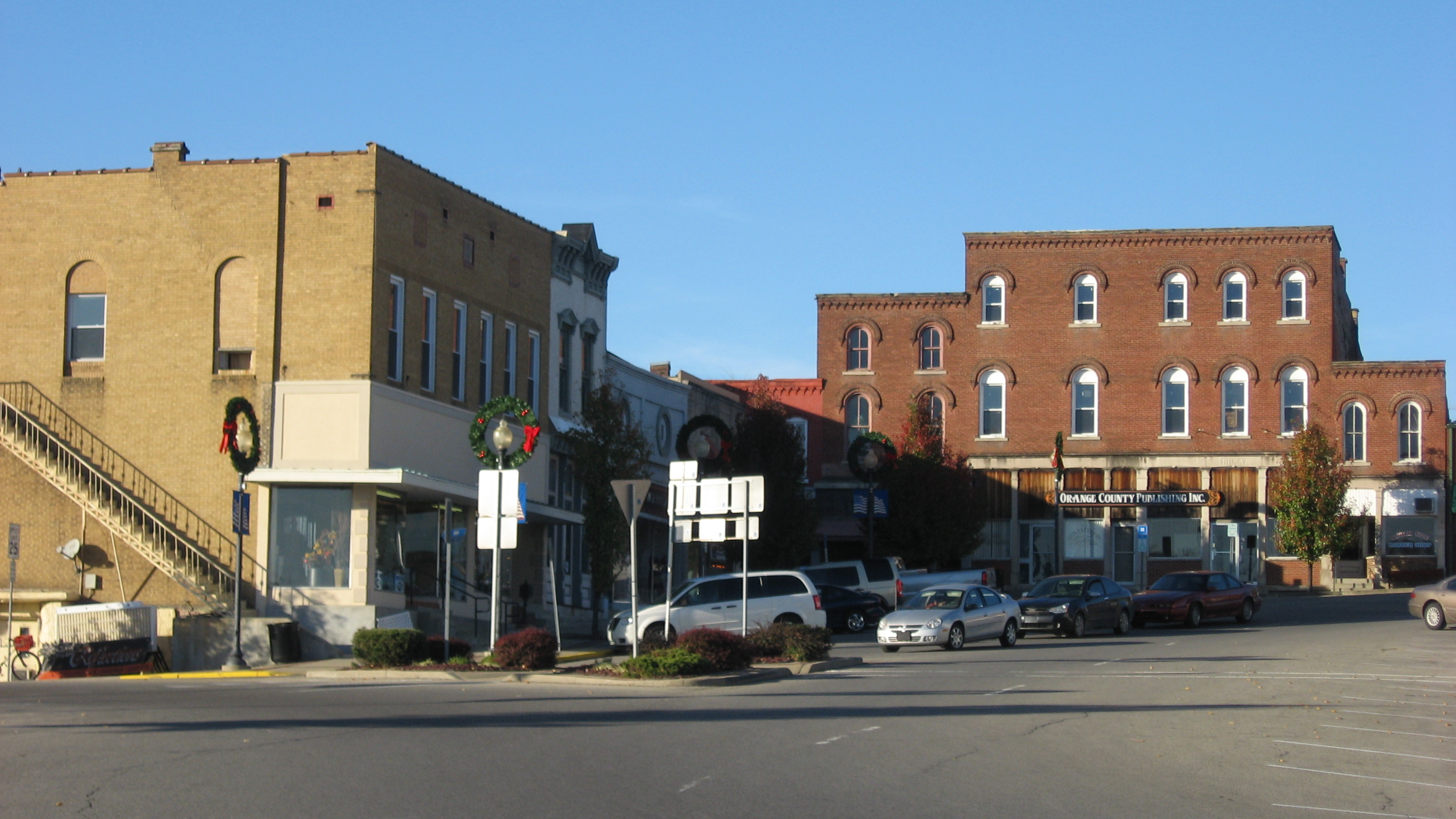
- Town Square in Paoli

- Logo
- Mottoes: "The Heart of Hoosier Hospitality", "An American Heritage Destination"
- Location of Paoli in Orange County, Indiana.
- Coordinates: 38°33′26″N 86°28′12″W
- Country: United States
- State: Indiana
- County: Orange
- Township: Paoli

Area
  - Total: 3.75 sq mi (9.72 km^{2})
  - Land: 3.74 sq mi (9.68 km^{2})
  - Water: 0.015 sq mi (0.04 km^{2})
- Elevation: 617 ft (188 m)

Population (2020)
  - Total: 3,666
  - Density: 980.4/sq mi (378.54/km^{2})
- Time zone: UTC-5 (Eastern (EST))
  - Summer (DST): UTC-4 (EDT)
- ZIP code: 47454
- Area codes: 812, 930
- FIPS code: 18-57780
- GNIS feature ID: 2396846
- Website: paoli.in.gov

Paoli (/peɪˈoʊli/ pay-OH-lee) is a town within Paoli Township and the county seat of Orange County, in the U.S. state of Indiana. As of the 2020 census, Paoli had a population of 3,666.

== History ==
Paoli was laid out and platted in 1816. It was named for Pasquale Paoli Ash, the son of North Carolina governor Samuel Ashe. A post office has been in operation at Paoli since 1817.

In its first decades, it was noted as a Quaker town that played a role in the Underground Railroad by transporting enslaved people from the South to Canada. In the 1900s, it became known as the site of the Pioneer Mothers Memorial Forest, a surviving fragment of the once-extensive virgin oak forest of southern Indiana.

== Geography ==
According to the 2010 census, Paoli has a total area of 3.75 square miles (9.71 km^{2}), of which 3.74 square miles (9.69 km^{2}) (or 99.73%) is land and 0.01 square miles (0.03 km^{2}) (or 0.27%) is water.

=== Climate ===
The climate in this area is characterized by hot, humid summers and generally mild to cool winters. According to the Köppen Climate Classification system, Paoli has a humid subtropical climate, abbreviated "Cfa" on climate maps.

Climate data for Paoli, Indiana (1991–2020)
Month	Jan	Feb	Mar	Apr	May	Jun	Jul	Aug	Sep	Oct	Nov	Dec	Year
Mean daily maximum °F (°C)	40.2 (4.6)	44.8 (7.1)	54.6 (12.6)	66.8 (19.3)	75.9 (24.4)	83.5 (28.6)	86.6 (30.3)	85.9 (29.9)	79.6 (26.4)	68.3 (20.2)	55.0 (12.8)	44.1 (6.7)	65.4 (18.6)
Daily mean °F (°C)	30.8 (−0.7)	34.4 (1.3)	43.1 (6.2)	53.9 (12.2)	64.0 (17.8)	72.2 (22.3)	75.6 (24.2)	74.1 (23.4)	66.8 (19.3)	55.2 (12.9)	43.8 (6.6)	34.8 (1.6)	54.1 (12.3)
Mean daily minimum °F (°C)	21.4 (−5.9)	23.9 (−4.5)	31.6 (−0.2)	41.0 (5.0)	52.1 (11.2)	60.9 (16.1)	64.5 (18.1)	62.3 (16.8)	54.0 (12.2)	42.1 (5.6)	32.5 (0.3)	25.5 (−3.6)	42.7 (5.9)
Average precipitation inches (mm)	3.41 (87)	3.36 (85)	4.35 (110)	5.44 (138)	5.41 (137)	4.90 (124)	4.23 (107)	3.15 (80)	3.86 (98)	3.39 (86)	4.03 (102)	3.95 (100)	49.48 (1,254)
Average snowfall inches (cm)	3.7 (9.4)	5.2 (13)	1.2 (3.0)	0.0 (0.0)	0.0 (0.0)	0.0 (0.0)	0.0 (0.0)	0.0 (0.0)	0.0 (0.0)	0.0 (0.0)	0.1 (0.25)	2.6 (6.6)	12.8 (32.25)
Source: NOAA

== Demographics ==
Historical population
Census	Pop.	Note	%±
1850	461		—
1870	628		—
1880	696		10.8%
1890	707		1.6%
1900	1,186		67.8%
1910	1,278		7.8%
1920	1,520		18.9%
1930	2,016		32.6%
1940	2,218		10.0%
1950	2,575		16.1%
1960	2,754		7.0%
1970	3,281		19.1%
1980	3,637		10.9%
1990	3,542		−2.6%
2000	3,844		8.5%
2010	3,677		−4.3%
2020	3,666		−0.3%
U.S. Decennial Census

=== Racial and ethnic composition ===
Paoli town, Indiana – Racial composition Note: the US Census treats Hispanic/Latino as an ethnic category. This table excludes Latinos from the racial categories and assigns them to a separate category. Hispanics/Latinos may be of any race.
Race (NH = Non-Hispanic)	% 2020	% 2010	% 2000	Pop 2020	Pop 2010	Pop 2000
White alone (NH)	92%	96.8%	97.8%	3,372	3,560	3,759
Black alone (NH)	0.8%	0.3%	0.2%	30	11	8
American Indian alone (NH)	0.1%	0.2%	0.2%	2	9	9
Asian alone (NH)	0.6%	0.3%	0.2%	21	12	7
Pacific Islander alone (NH)	0%	0%	0%	1	0	0
Other race alone (NH)	0.2%	0.1%	0%	6	2	1
Multiracial (NH)	4.2%	1%	0.9%	153	35	33
Hispanic/Latino (any race)	2.2%	1.3%	0.7%	81	48	27

=== 2020 census ===
As of the 2020 census, Paoli had a population of 3,666. The median age was 39.4 years. 22.8% of residents were under the age of 18 and 19.0% of residents were 65 years of age or older. For every 100 females, there were 91.3 males, and for every 100 females age 18 and over there were 87.2 males age 18 and over.

0.0% of residents lived in urban areas, while 100.0% lived in rural areas.

There were 1,485 households in Paoli, of which 30.2% had children under the age of 18 living in them. Of all households, 39.1% were married-couple households, 17.5% were households with a male householder and no spouse or partner present, and 33.5% were households with a female householder and no spouse or partner present. About 32.3% of all households were made up of individuals and 13.3% had someone living alone who was 65 years of age or older.

There were 1,638 housing units, of which 9.3% were vacant. The homeowner vacancy rate was 2.0% and the rental vacancy rate was 4.3%.

=== 2010 census ===
As of the census of 2010, there were 3,677 people, 1,484 households, and 923 families living in the town. The population density was 983.2 inhabitants per square mile (379.6/km^{2}). There were 1,645 housing units at an average density of 439.8 per square mile (169.8/km^{2}). The racial makeup of the town was 97.7% White, 0.3% African American, 0.2% Native American, 0.3% Asian, 0.5% from other races, and 1.0% from two or more races. Hispanic or Latino of any race were 1.3% of the population.

There were 1,484 households, of which 31.5% had children under the age of 18 living with them, 42.2% were married couples living together, 15.0% had a female householder with no husband present, 5.0% had a male householder with no wife present, and 37.8% were non-families. 32.4% of all households were made up of individuals, and 14% had someone living alone who was 65 years of age or older. The average household size was 2.35 and the average family size was 2.97.

The median age in the town was 39.7 years. 23.8% of residents were under the age of 18; 8.2% were between the ages of 18 and 24; 25.5% were from 25 to 44; 25% were from 45 to 64; and 17.5% were 65 years of age or older. The gender makeup of the town was 48.3% male and 51.7% female.

=== 2000 census ===
As of the census of 2000, there were 3,844 people, 1,581 households, and 1,013 families living in the town. The population density was 1,016.0 inhabitants per square mile (392.3/km^{2}). There were 1,725 housing units at an average density of 455.9 per square mile (176.0/km^{2}). The racial makeup of the town was 98.34% White, 0.21% African American, 0.23% Native American, 0.18% Asian, 0.18% from other races, and 0.86% from two or more races. Hispanic or Latino of any race were 0.70% of the population.

There were 1,581 households, out of which 31.2% had children under the age of 18 living with them, 49.7% were married couples living together, 11.2% had a female householder with no husband present, and 35.9% were non-families. 32.5% of all households were made up of individuals, and 16.1% had someone living alone who was 65 years of age or older. The average household size was 2.31 and the average family size was 2.90.

In the town, the population was spread out, with 23.7% under the age of 18, 8.7% from 18 to 24, 27.7% from 25 to 44, 21.5% from 45 to 64, and 18.3% who were 65 years of age or older. The median age was 38 years. For every 100 females, there were 91.3 males. For every 100 females age 18 and over, there were 87.2 males.

The median income for a household in the town was $26,962, and the median income for a family was $34,412. Males had a median income of $28,566 versus $20,110 for females. The per capita income for the town was $14,313. About 12.8% of families and 15.1% of the population were below the poverty line, including 15.2% of those under age 18 and 13.3% of those age 65 or over.

== Arts and culture ==
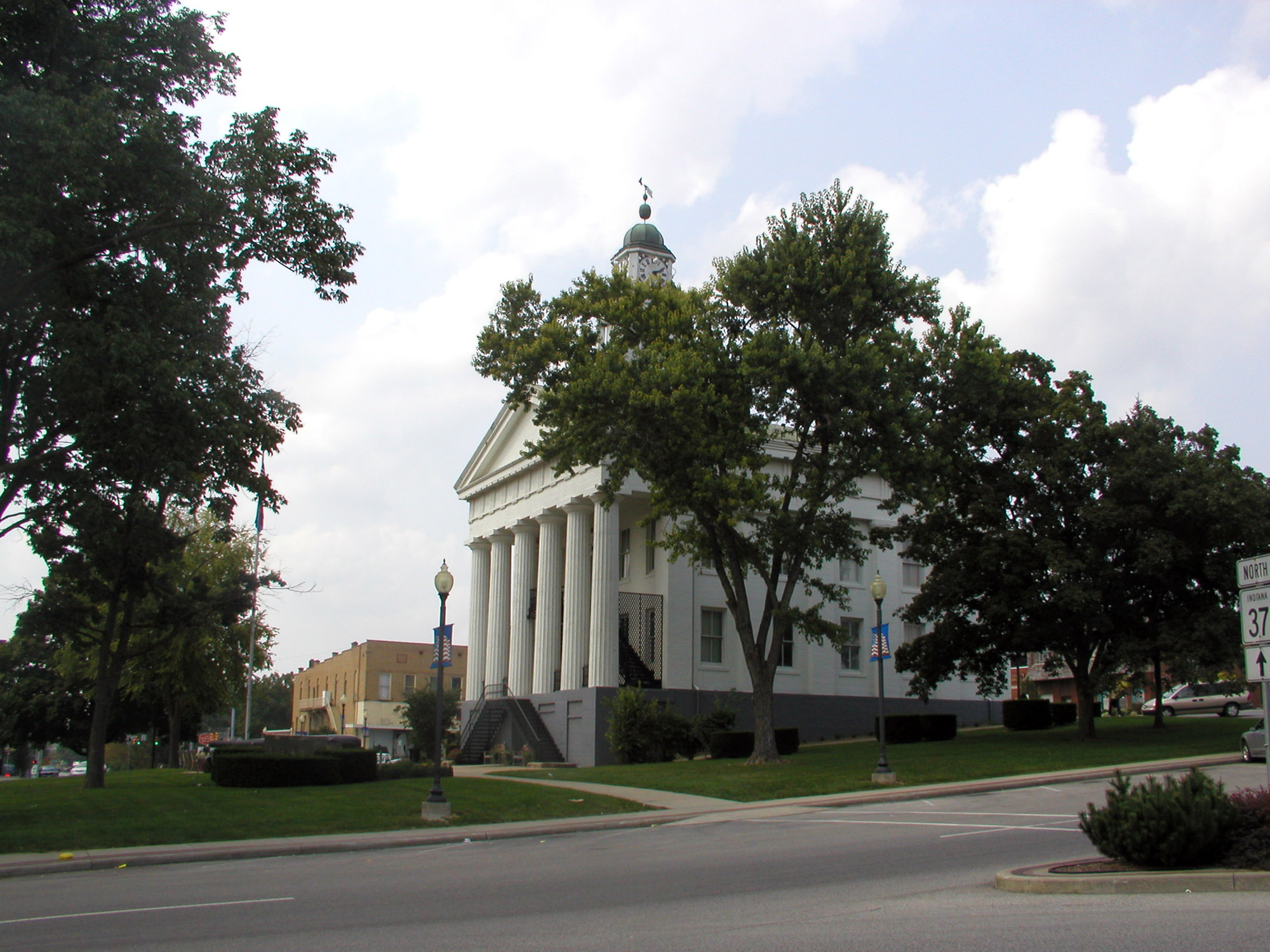
Orange County Courthouse on the square in Paoli

Thomas Newby Braxtan House, Orange County Courthouse, and Paoli Historic District are listed on the National Register of Historic Places.

The town has a lending library, the Paoli Public Library.

== Media ==
The Paoli News-Republican was a newspaper founded in 1875, and published weekly until January 2010.

== Notable people ==
- Sandra Blanton, Democratic member of the Indiana House of Representatives from 2007 to 2011
- Margaret Hamilton, developed on-board flight software for the Apollo program
- Ken Trinkle, right-handed relief pitcher in Major League Baseball from 1943 to 1949.

== See also ==
Paoli Peaks, a nearby ski resort.
