= Haysville, Indiana =

- Unincorporated community and Census Designated Place
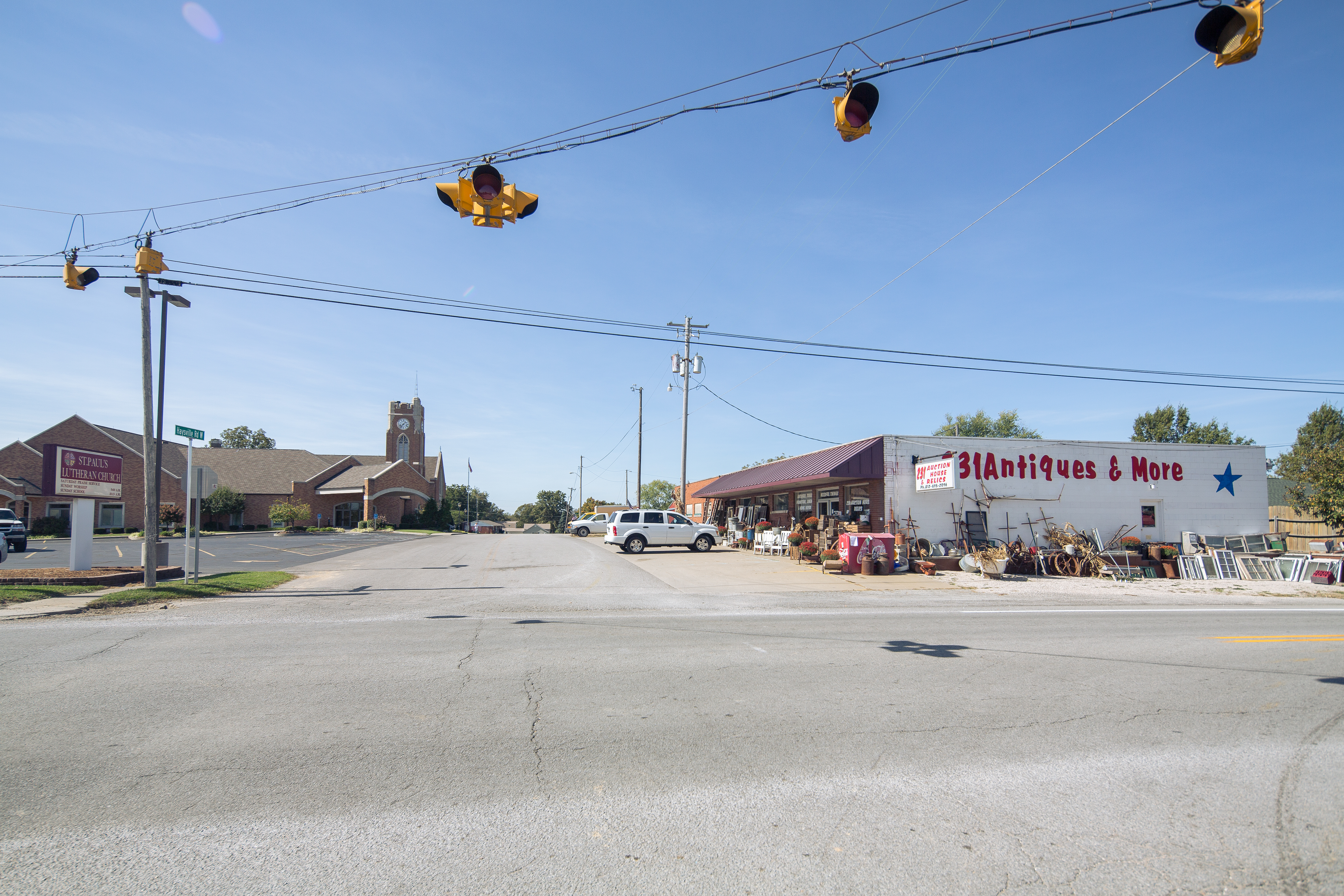

- Location within Indiana Location within the United States
- Coordinates: 38°29′11″N 86°54′35″W
- Country: United States
- State: Indiana
- County: Dubois
- Township: Harbison
- Elevation: 528 ft (161 m)
- Time zone: UTC-5 (Eastern (EST))
  - Summer (DST): UTC-4 (EDT)
- ZIP code: 47546
- Area codes: 812, 930
- FIPS code: 18-32638
- GNIS feature ID: 2830363

Haysville is an unincorporated community in Harbison Township, Dubois County, in the U.S. state of Indiana.

== History ==
Haysville was laid out in about 1835. It was named in honor of Judge Willis Hayes, the original owner of the town site.

A post office was established at Haysville in 1846, and remained in operation until it was discontinued in 1914.

== Demographics ==
The United States Census Bureau delineated Haysville as a census designated place in the 2022 American Community Survey.
