= Pioneer Mothers Memorial Forest =

Forest in Indiana, United States

Coordinates: 38.540°N 86.454°W

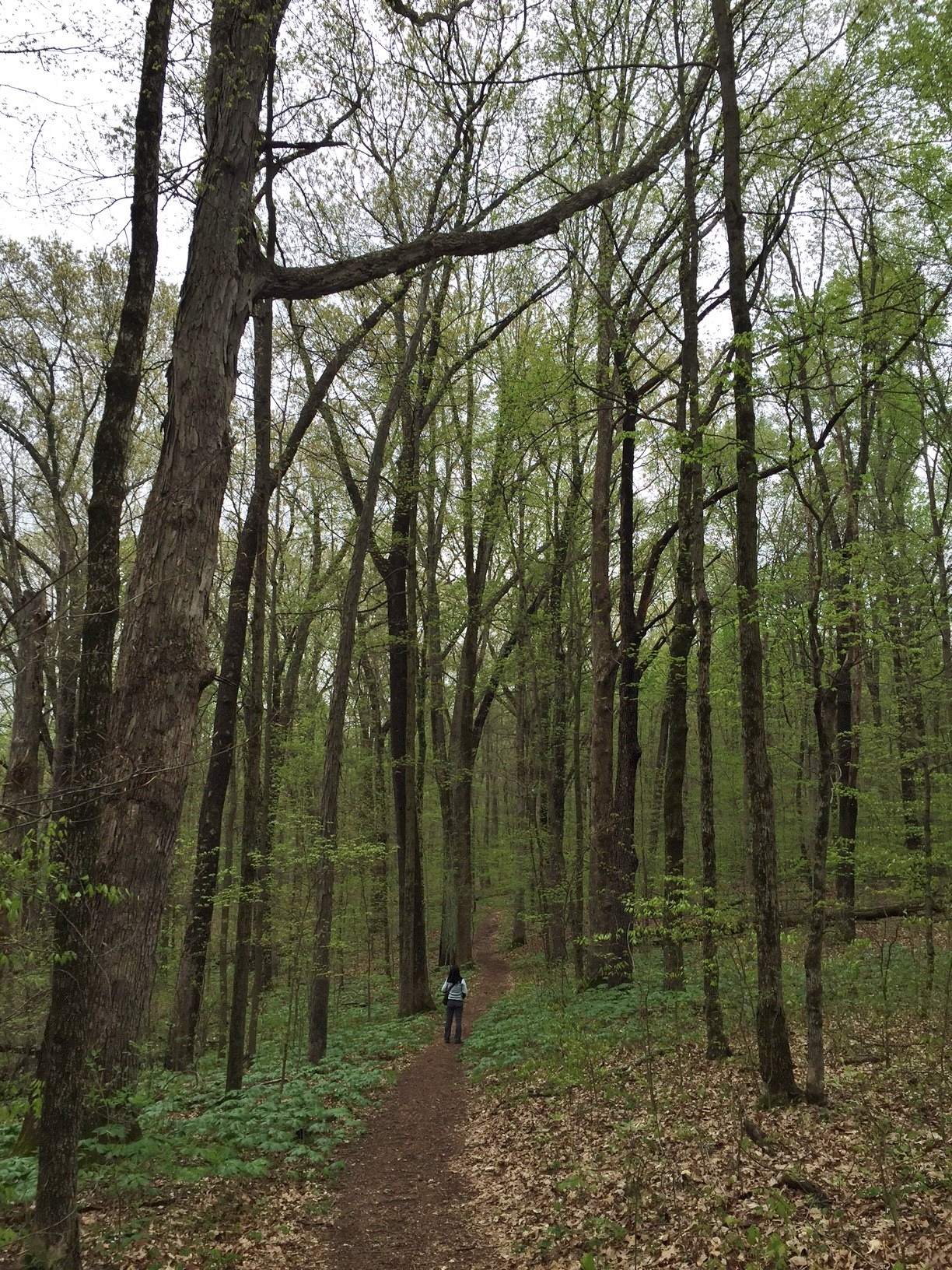
An image of the trail in the Pioneer Mother's Memorial Forest within the Hoosier National Forest in late April. The large height of the trees can be discerned when compared to the person standing in the trail.

The Pioneer Mothers Memorial Forest is an 88-acre oak-hickory forest located in Orange County, Indiana, near Paoli. Identified as a surviving fragment of virgin Central Hardwood forest, a woodland type that largely vanished in the 1800s, it is a National Natural Landmark and Research Natural Area within the Hoosier National Forest.

== Description ==
The old-growth woodlot is characterized by mature stands of white ash, white oak, tuliptree, and black walnut. The United States Forest Service (USFS) has measured several of these trees at 60 feet to the first limb and 50 inches in diameter at breast height. As many of these trees were harvested in pioneer times for firewood or construction timber, the Pioneer Mothers Memorial Forest was a valuable relic by the time it was set aside for conservation in 1944.

The Forest Service credits preservation of the mature woodlot to the Cox family. The land was patented in 1816 by Joseph Cox. Unlike most other timbered lands of southern Indiana, the Cox family never harvested the forest during the 124-year duration of family ownership. Upon the death of the last Cox owner in 1940, a preservation effort led to support for purchase of the land by the Forest Service. The USFS continues to manage the parcel for research and recreation purposes. Studies of the forest tract have uncovered a Native American bottomland village area with archeological remains dating to approximately 1380 CE. A 1.3-mile hiking trail is open to the public.
