= Sangchris Lake =

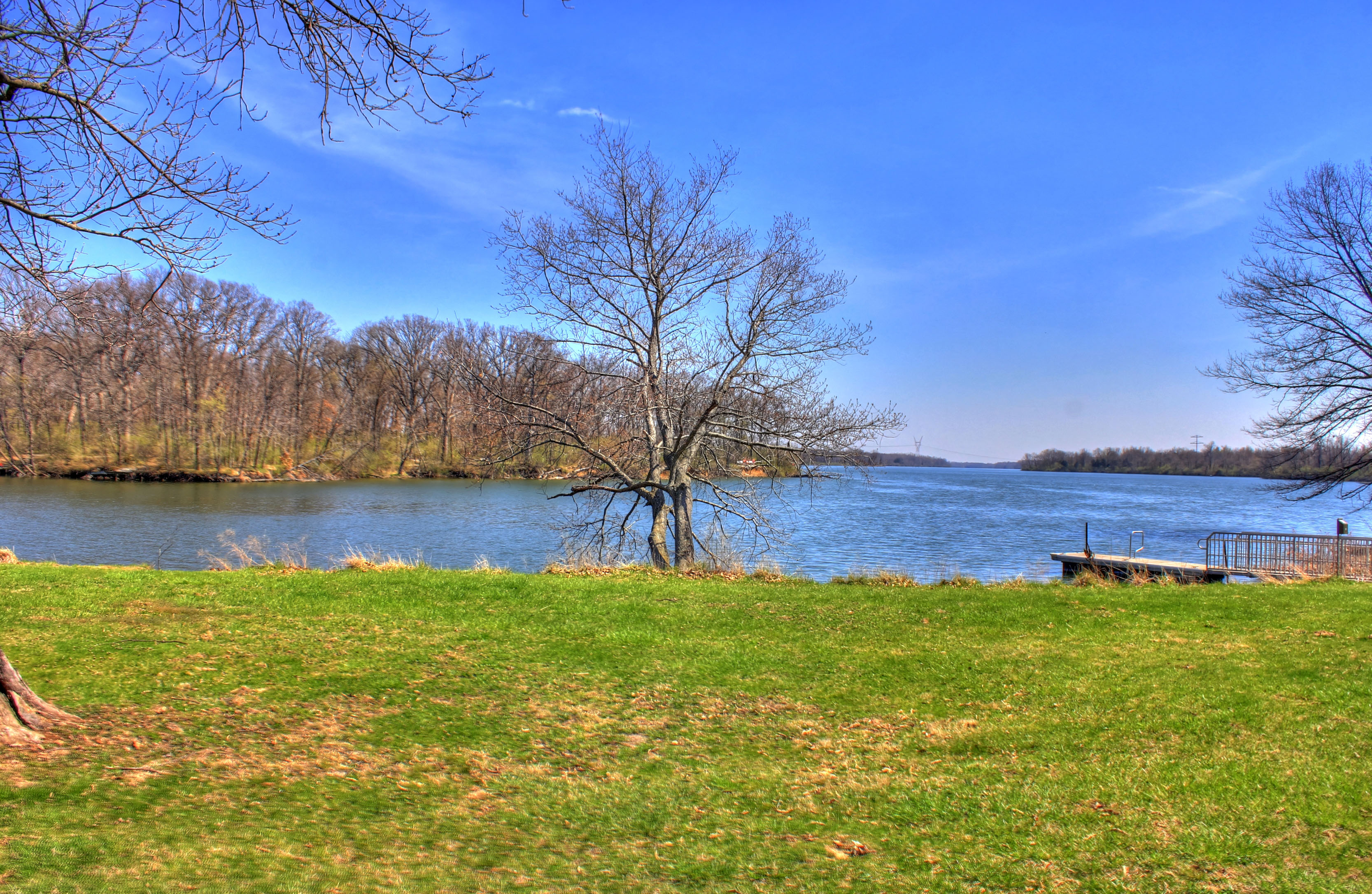
- View of Sangchris Lake

- Location within Illinois Location within the United States
- Location: Christian / Sangamon counties, Illinois, U.S.
- Coordinates: 39°38′47″N 89°28′37″W
- Type: reservoir
- Primary inflows: Clear Creek
- Primary outflows: Clear Creek
- Basin countries: United States
- Max. length: 7 mi (11 km)
- Surface area: 3,022 acres (1,223 ha)
- Surface elevation: 584 ft (178 m)

Sangchris Lake is a 3,022 acres (1,223 ha) reservoir located in Christian and Sangamon Counties, Illinois. It was created in 1964 by damming Clear Creek, a tributary of the South Fork of the Sangamon River, for recreation and to serve as a source for cooling water for the Kincaid Generating Station. The lake is no more than 7 miles (11 km) long from headwaters to dam, but so jagged is its shore that the lake's total shoreline measures 120 miles (193 km) in length. Much of the shoreline is now part of Sangchris Lake State Recreation Area. The nearest town is Kincaid, Illinois.

The lake's name comes from SANG for Sangamon County, Illinois and CHRIS for Christian County, Illinois.

As of 2013, the lake and state park are operated by the Illinois Department of Natural Resources, and the adjacent 1,108 megawatt Kincaid Generating Station, a coal-fired generating plant, is operated by Vistra, an electricity conglomerate. The lake is known for its crappie, largemouth bass, and striped bass fisheries.
