= Orange County Courthouse (Indiana) =

Historic government building in Indiana, United States

- U.S. National Register of Historic Places
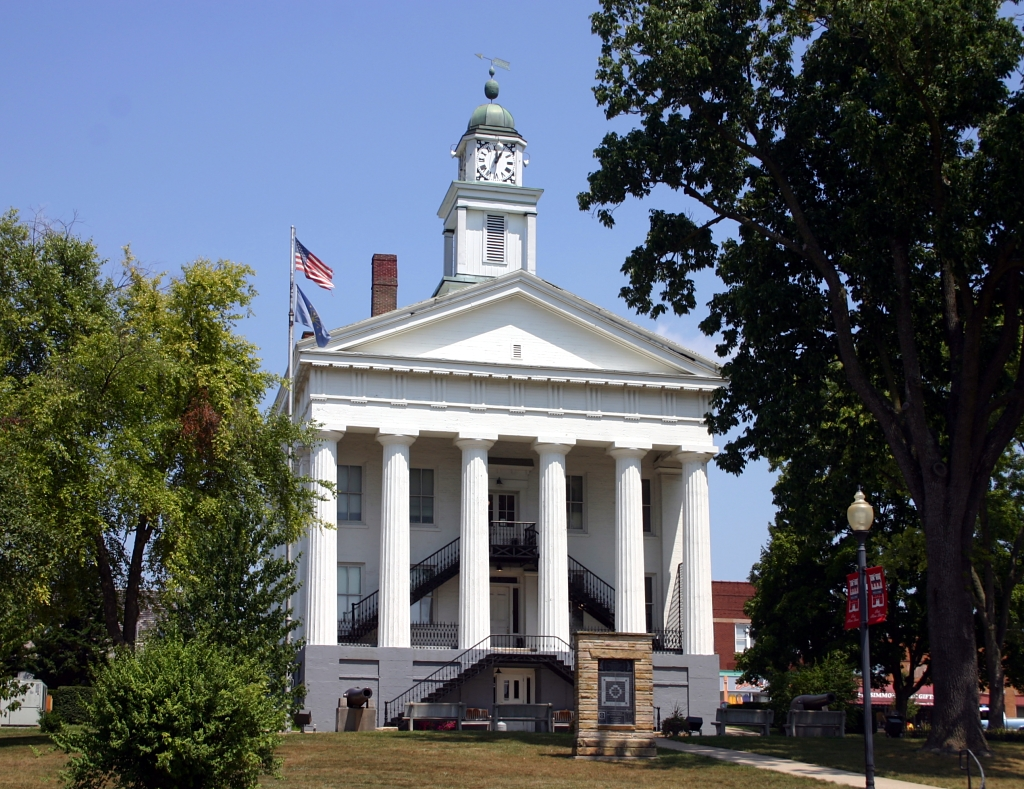
- Southern front of the courthouse

- Location within Indiana Location within the United States
- Location: Public Sq., Paoli, Indiana
- Coordinates: 38°33′23″N 86°28′7″W
- Area: 1 acre (0.40 ha)
- Built: 1847
- Architect: Multiple
- Architectural style: Greek Revival
- NRHP reference No.: 75000009
- Added to NRHP: February 24, 1975

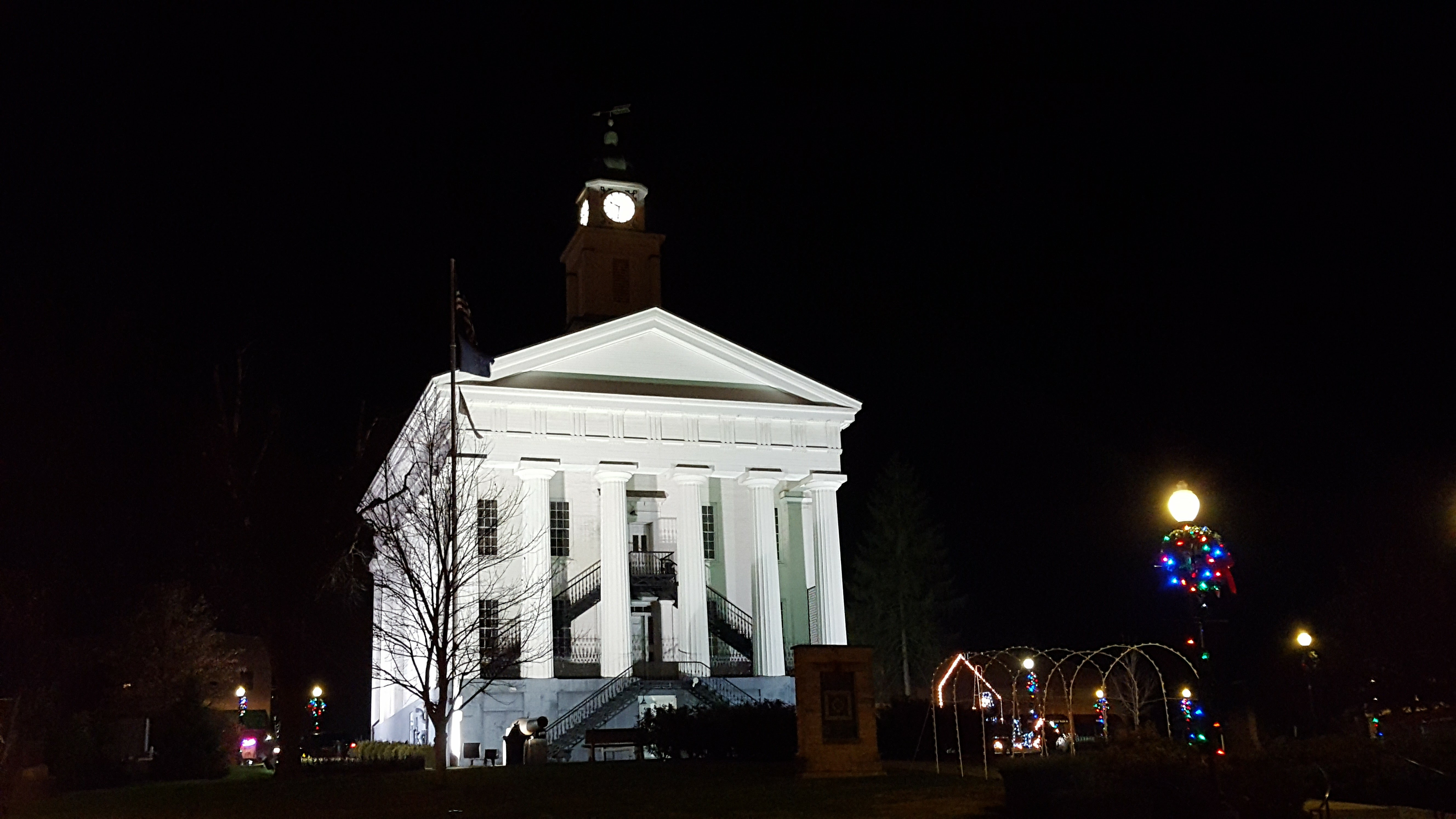
Orange County Courthouse at night, 2016

The Orange County Courthouse is located on Courthouse Square in Paoli, Indiana at the intersection of State Roads 37, 56 and US Highway 150.

The courthouse is one of the two oldest courthouses in Indiana that have been used continuously, the other being in Rising Sun, Indiana (Ohio County). The Orange County Courthouse was built 1847–1850. It is a good example of the Greek Revival style of architecture. The courthouse is distinguished by a Doric portico with six fluted columns.

It was listed on the National Register of Historic Places in 1975.
