= Mentor, Indiana =

- Unincorporated community
- Location within Indiana Location within the United States
- Coordinates: 38°18′59″N 86°43′08″W
- Country: United States
- State: Indiana
- County: Dubois
- Township: Jefferson
- Elevation: 742 ft (226 m)
- Time zone: UTC-5 (Eastern (EST))
  - Summer (DST): UTC-4 (EDT)
- ZIP code: 47513
- Area codes: 812, 930
- FIPS code: 18-48420
- GNIS feature ID: 451211

Mentor is an unincorporated community in Jefferson Township, Dubois County, Indiana, United States.

== History ==
Mentor was founded in 1881 by Francis M. Sanders. Sanders, an admirer of President James A. Garfield, named the settlement for Garfield's hometown of Mentor, Ohio.

An old variant name of the community was called Altoga. A post office ran with this name from 1883 to 1908.
