= List of public art at the Indiana Statehouse =

This is a list of public art in and around the Indiana Statehouse, the Indiana Government Center North, and the Indiana Government Center South, which make up the Indiana Statehouse Public Art Collection.

Title	Artist	Year	Location/GPS Coordinates	Material	Dimensions	Owner	Image
Christopher Columbus (sculpture by Vittori)	Enrico Vittori	1920	Indiana Statehouse (grounds) 39°46′4.85″N 86°9′47.45″W	Bronze, granite	39 × 23 × 29 in.	State of Indiana	
Abraham Lincoln (relief by Schwarz)	Rudolph Schwarz and Marie Stewart	1906	Indiana Government Center South (grounds) 39°46′2.71″N 86°9′54.48″W	Bronze	65 × 35 in.	State of Indiana	
George Washington	Donald De Lue	1959	Indiana Statehouse (grounds) 39°46′3.33″N 86°9′45.66″W	Bronze	9 ft. 4 in. × 46 in. × 36 in. (900 lbs.)	State of Indiana	
Tulip to Life	Eric Ernstberger	1991	Indiana Government Center South (grounds) 39°46′4.92″N 86°9′52.48″W	Stainless steel, copper, limestone	42 in. × 15 ft. × 18 ft.	State of Indiana	
Indiana Law Enforcement and Firefighters Memorial	Multiple	2001	Indiana Government Center North (grounds) 39°46′8.70″N 86°9′49.88″W	Bronze, Granite, Indiana Limestone	multiple pieces	State of Indiana	
Oliver P. Morton (monument)	Rudolph Schwarz	1907	Indiana Statehouse (grounds) 39°46′6.99″N 86°9′42.93″W	Bronze, granite	10 × 4 × 4 ft.	State of Indiana	
Robert Dale Owen Memorial	Frances Goodwin	1911	Indiana Statehouse (grounds) 39°46′4.06″N 86°9′45.62″W	Bronze	45.5 × 42.5 × 70 in.	State of Indiana	
Thomas A. Hendricks Monument	Richard Henry Park	1890	Indiana Statehouse (grounds) 39°46′3.29″N 86°9′43.87″W	Bronze, red granite	132 in × 60 in × 60 in	State of Indiana	
Coal Miner (statue)	John J. Szaton	1966	Indiana Statehouse (grounds) 39°46′08.33″N 86°9′47.3″W	Bronze, black granite	85 × 26 1/2 × 28 in.	State of Indiana	
The Westward Journey	Herman Carl Mueller	1878	Indiana Statehouse (grounds) 39°46′4.75″N 86°9′45.67″W	Limestone	4 units. Figure groupings: 12 × 12 × 3 1/2; Single figures: 12 × 3 1/2 × 3 1/2 ft.	State of Indiana	
Workers' Memorial Sculpture	Daniel Edwards	1995	Indiana Government Center South (grounds) 39°46′8.77″N 86°10′0.07″W	Bronze on limestone base		State of Indiana	
Young Abe Lincoln	David K. Rubins	1962	Indiana Government Center South (grounds) 39°46′6.74″N 86°9′54.65″W	Bronze, Granite	108 × 30 × 38 1/2 in.	State of Indiana	
Abraham Lincoln (bust by Jones)	Thomas Dow Jones	1862	Indiana Statehouse	plaster	33" × 25" × 18"	State of Indiana	
Ashbel Parsons Willard (bust)	Henry Dexter	1860	Indiana Statehouse	plaster	9" × 11.5" × 23.5"	State of Indiana	
Benjamin Harrison (bust)	Richard Peglow		Indiana Statehouse			State of Indiana	
Calvin Fletcher (bust)	Unknown		Indiana Statehouse	Marble	47.5 × 20 × 10.25 inches	State of Indiana	
Colonel Richard Owen (bust)	Belle Kinney Scholz	1913	Indiana Statehouse	Bronze	70 × 40 × 21 in.	State of Indiana	
Daniel W. Voorhees (bust)	James Paxton Voorhees		Indiana Statehouse	Plaster	31 × 27 × 18 in	State of Indiana	
George Rogers Clark (bust)	David McLary	1987	Indiana Statehouse	Plaster		State of Indiana	
George Washington (bust by Houdon)	Jean-Antoine Houdon	1932	Indiana Statehouse	Plaster	25 × 18 × 18 in	Indiana Historical Bureau	
Frank O'Bannon (bust)	Kenneth G. Ryden	2005	Indiana Statehouse	Bronze	17 × 10 × 37 in.	State of Indiana	
Henry F. Schricker (bust)	David K. Rubins	1964	Indiana Statehouse	Bronze and limestone	49 × 29 × 22 in.	State of Indiana	
Matthew E. Welsh (bust)	Daniel Edwards	1996	Indiana Statehouse	Bronze	23.5 × 12.75 × 12 in	State of Indiana	
Otis Bowen (bust)	Lou Ann Lanagan	1981	Indiana Statehouse	Bronze on wooden base	20.5 × 13	State of Indiana	
Robert D. Orr (bust)	Don Ingle	1987	Indiana Statehouse	Bronze	30 × 21 × 15 in	State of Indiana	
Sherman Minton (bust)	Robert Merrell Gage	1956	Indiana Statehouse	Bronze	30.25 × 24 × 11.75 in	State of Indiana	
Stephen Neal (bust)	Clara Barth Leonard	1907	Indiana Statehouse	Bronze	27 × 24 × 15 in.; 68.58 × 60.96 × 38.1 cm	State of Indiana	
William H. English (bust)	Unknown		Indiana Statehouse	Marble	22 × 24 × 15 in.; 55.88 × 60.96 × 38.1 cm	State of Indiana	
Indiana (statue)	Retta T. Matthews	1893	Indiana Statehouse	Metal		State of Indiana	
Sarah T. Bolton (relief)	Emma Sangernebo	1941	Indiana Statehouse	Bronze	49 in. × 31 1/8 in. × 3/4 in.	State of Indiana	
Frances Elizabeth Willard (relief)	Lorado Taft	1929	Indiana Statehouse	Bronze	49.75 in × 32 in × .5 in	State of Indiana	
Wendell Willkie (relief)	Paul Fjelde		Indiana Statehouse	Bronze	50.75 in × 33.25 in × 1 in	State of Indiana	
Here I Grew Up	Garo Z. Antreasian	1962	Indiana Government Center North	Bysantine Smalti	70 × 25 ft.	State of Indiana	
Plaque honoring 1st religious service in Indianapolis	Howard Petty	1924	Indiana Statehouse				
Values of Civilization	Alexander Doyle	1888	Indiana Statehouse	Marble	9 ft.	State of Indiana	
Spirit of Indiana	Eugene Francis Savage	1964	Indiana Statehouse	Oil on linen canvas	21 × 41.5 ft.	State of Indiana	
Indiana state stone (sculpture)	Perry, Matthews, & Buskirk Quarry		Indiana Statehouse	Limestone on oak base with metal casters and steel plate	16.25 in × 16 in × 16 in	State of Indiana	
