= Indiana Statehouse Public Art Collection =

The Indiana Statehouse Public Art Collection, located in Indianapolis, Indiana, consists of more than 40 public artworks that are on display inside and around the grounds of Indiana Statehouse and the Indiana Government Center North and Indiana Government Center South.

The Statehouse was built in 1888 and remains one of the most important Neo-Classical Revival buildings in the state of Indiana. The building, which is listed on the National Register of Historic Places, has an interior that is decorated in the Italian Renaissance style.

The artworks at the Indiana Statehouse illustrate more than 130 years of artistic activity in a variety of mediums.

== Grounds ==
The sculptures on the east and south lawn of the Statehouse are the most visible of all. Notable artworks include the Oliver P. Morton Monument, which was installed in 1907. Also on the grounds are sculptures of Christopher Columbus, a youthful Abraham Lincoln, Thomas A. Hendricks, and the pedestal remaining from the Robert Dale Owen Memorial, an artwork which was stolen in 1970.

== Inside the Statehouse and Government Centers ==
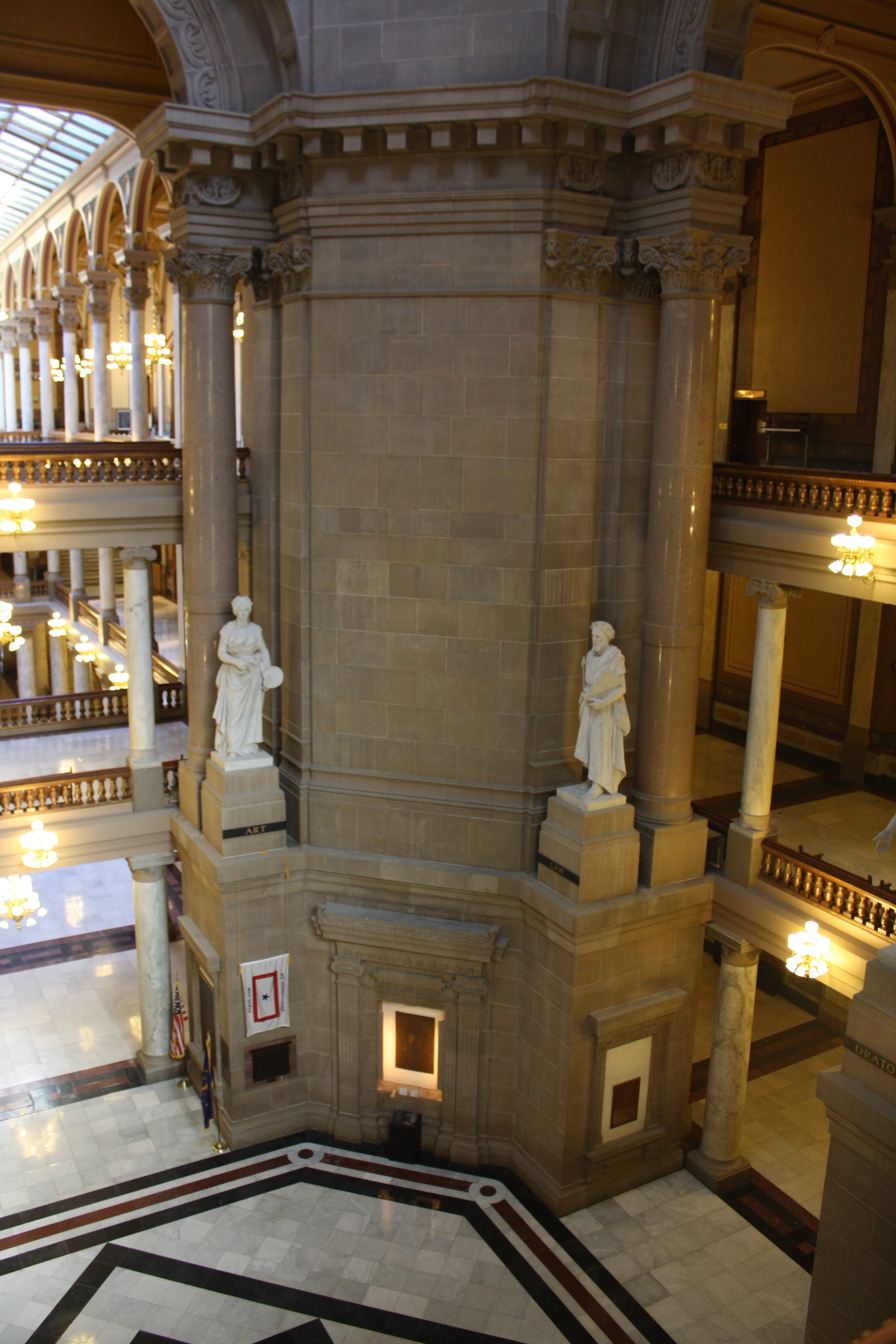
Two of the eight sculptures depicting the Values of Civilization

Alexander Doyle's set of eight sculptures depicting the Values of Civilization (Agriculture, Art, Commerce, History, Justice, Law, Liberty, and Oratory) were commissioned for the Statehouse in the late 1880s and remain among the most prominent interior sculptures. Other notable works include many portrait busts and bronze plaques of Indiana governors and notable citizens. There is a 21 x 41.5 foot mural depicting the Spirit of Indiana on the east wall of the Indiana House of Representatives and a figural representation of state of Indiana which was commissioned for the 1893 World's Columbian Exposition.

== Image gallery ==
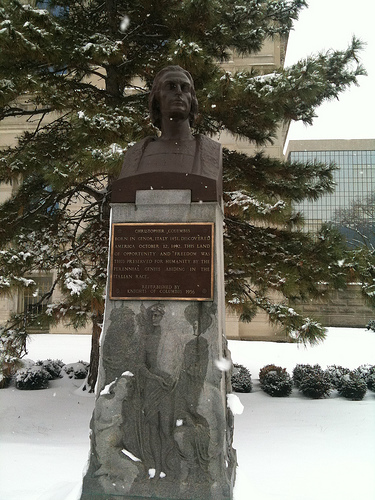
Christopher Columbus by Enrico Vittori

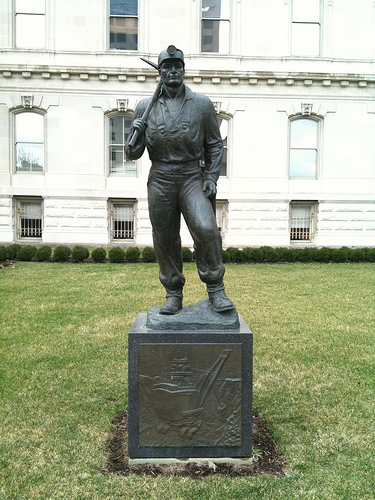
Coal Miner by John Szaton

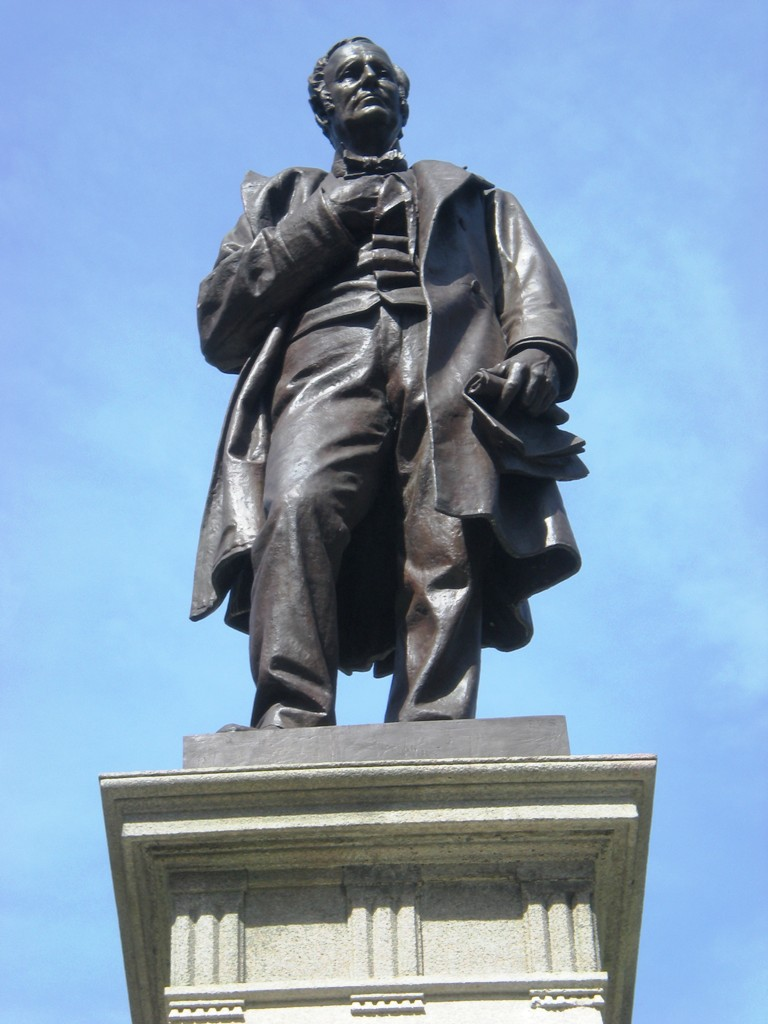
Thomas A. Hendricks by Richard Henry Park, 1890

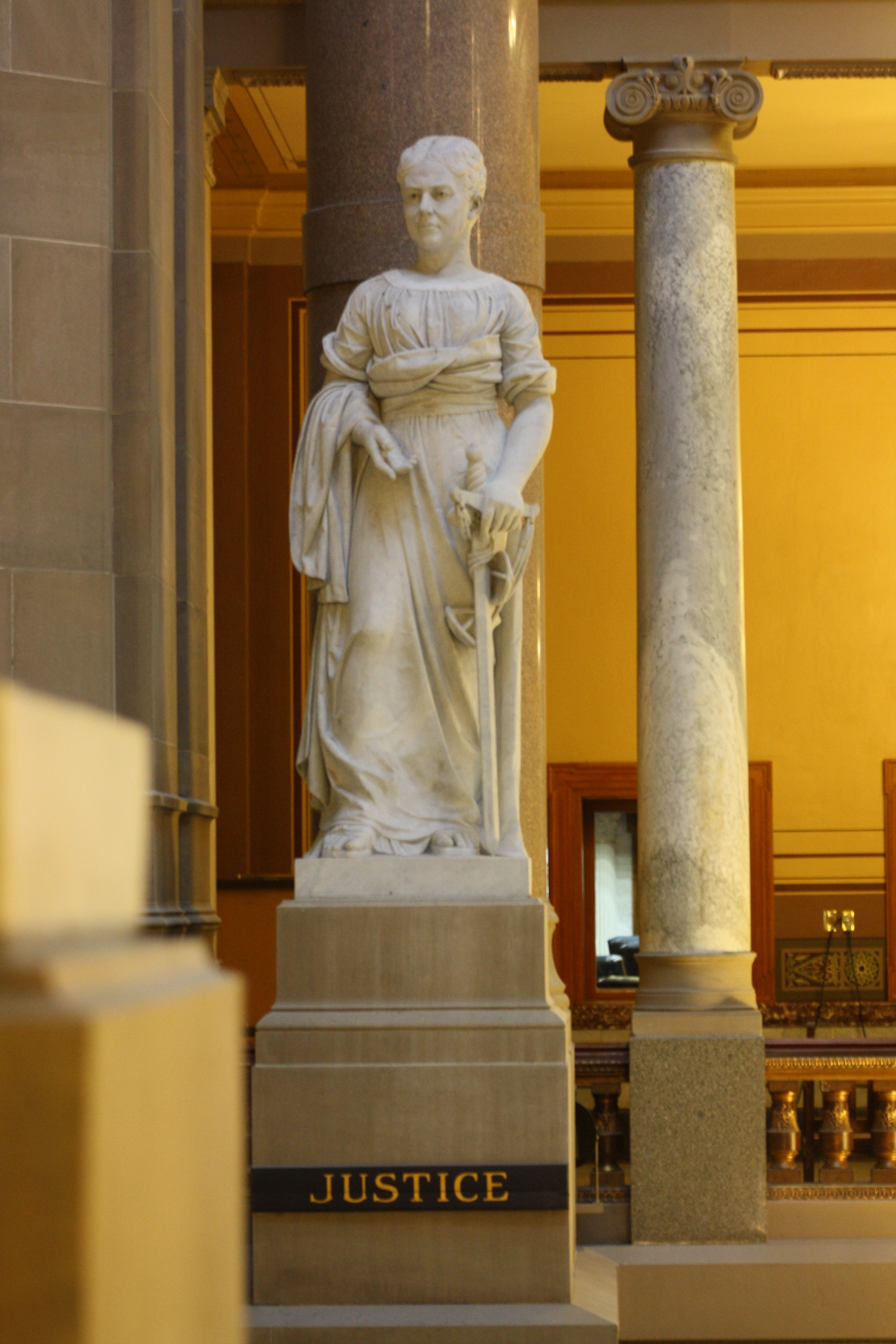
Sculpture of Justice

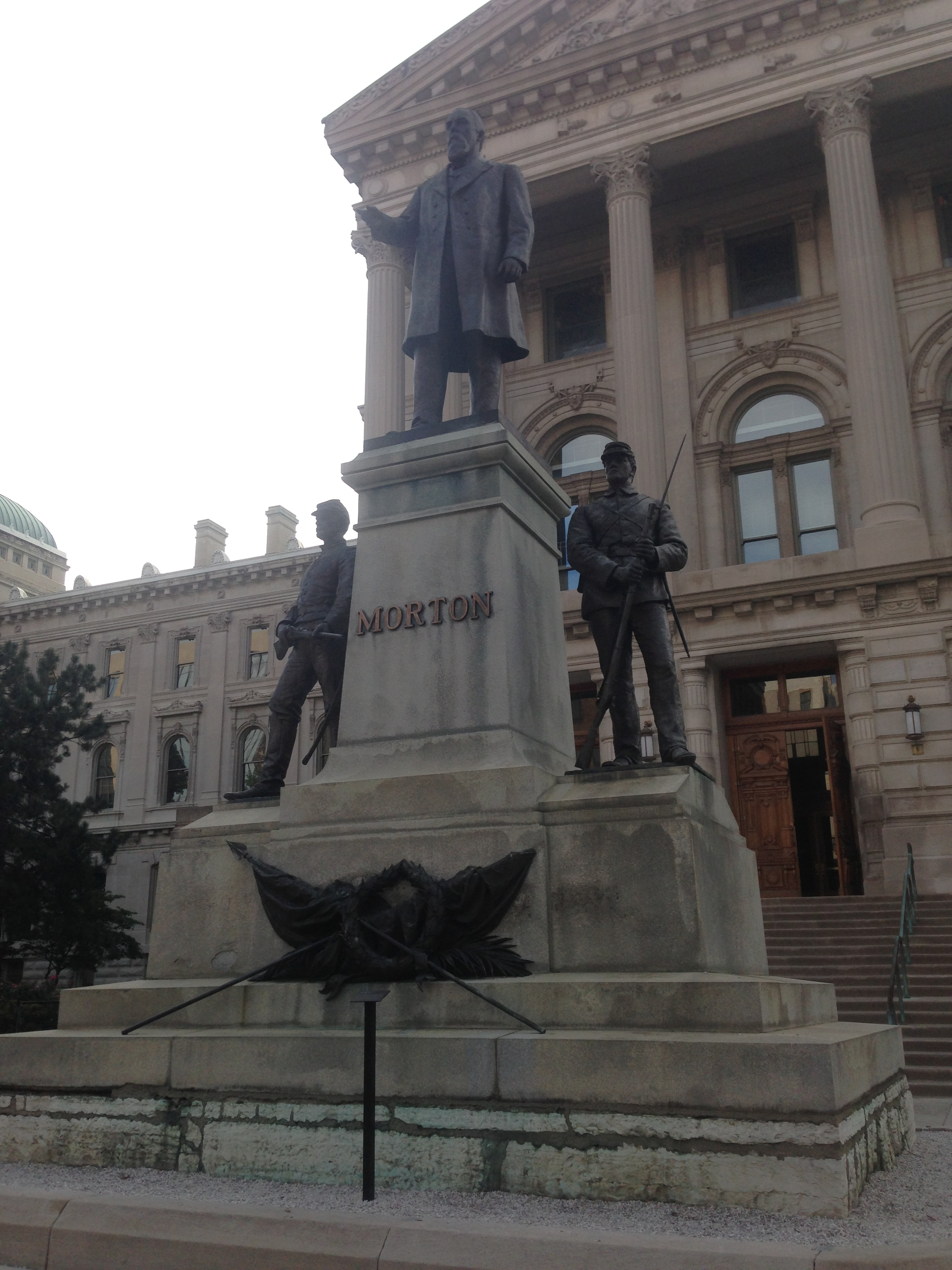
Oliver P. Morton and Reliefs by Rudolf Schwarz

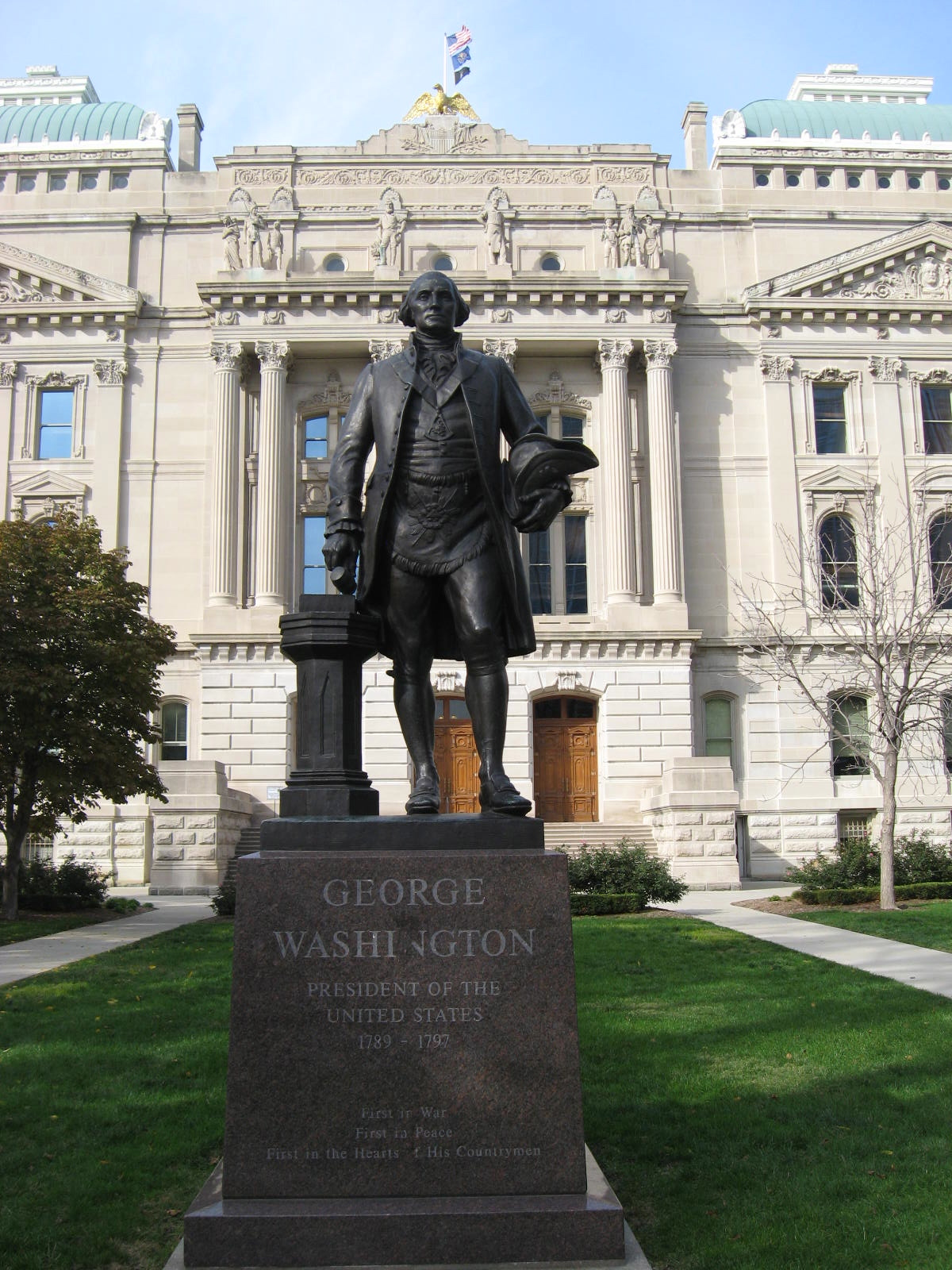
George Washington by Donald DeLue, 1959

== Documentation ==
The Indiana State Museum maintains a computerized database of many of the artworks at and around the Statehouse. In addition, a Fall 2010 Museum Studies course at IUPUI undertook the project of researching, photo documenting, and reporting on the condition of artworks.

This effort was influenced by the successful Save Outdoor Sculpture! 1989 campaign organized by Heritage Preservation: The National Institute of Conservation partnered with the Smithsonian Institution, specifically the Smithsonian American Art Museum. Throughout the 1990s, over 7,000 volunteers nationwide cataloged and assessed the condition of over 30,000 publicly accessible statues, monuments, and sculptures installed as outdoor public art across the United States.

The project of documenting this collection was based on the work that was done to document the IUPUI Public Art Collection, which was completed in the fall of 2009 and received national recognition.

=== Recognition of project ===
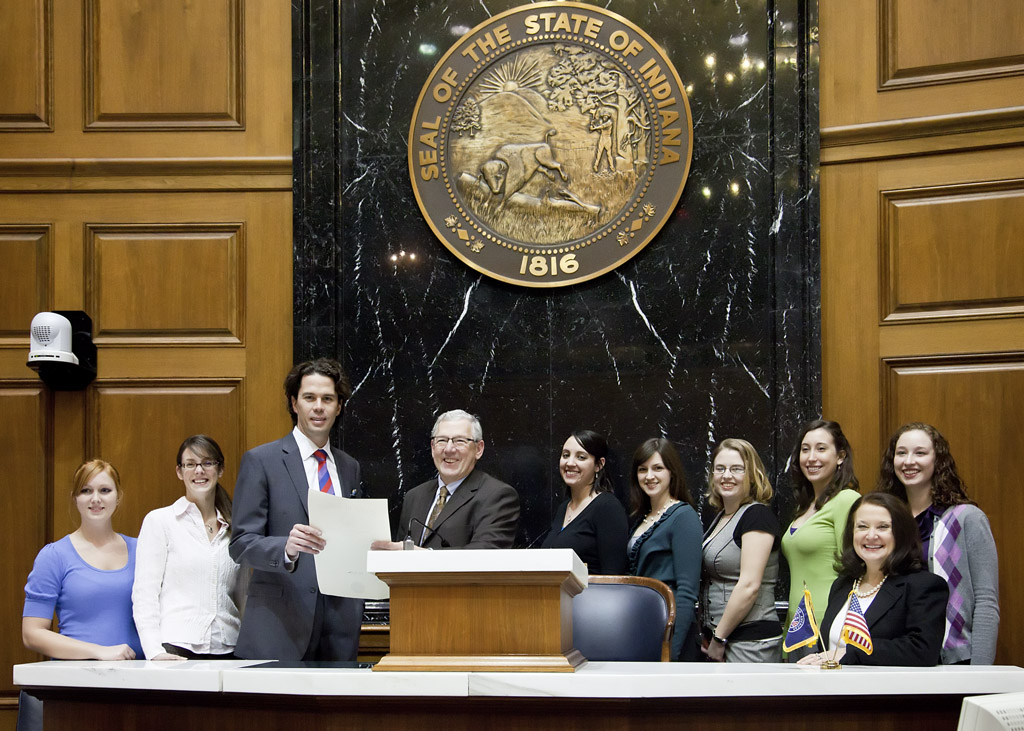
Representative Saunders presents the Concurrent Resolution to instructor Richard McCoy and students of the IUPUI Museums Studies Program

The work to assemble documentation of these artworks was recognized by the Indiana Senate and House of Representatives, who each issued a Concurrent Resolution (sponsored by Senator Jim Merritt and Representative Tom Saunders) to recognize the "valuable work being done by Richard McCoy and the students enrolled in the IUPUI Museum Studies Collections Care and Management course."

== See also ==
- IUPUI Public Art Collection
