= Bust of Calvin Fletcher =

Public artwork in Indianapolis, Indiana, United States

Calvin Fletcher
- Artist: Unknown
- Year: Unknown
- Type: Sculpture
- Dimensions: 121 cm × 51 cm × 26.0 cm (47.5 in × 20 in × 10.25 in)
- Location: Indiana Statehouse; Indianapolis; 39°46′7″N 86°9′45″W
- Owner: State of Indiana

Calvin Fletcher is a public artwork by an unknown artist, located inside the Indiana Statehouse in Indianapolis, Indiana, United States. The marble bust depicts Calvin Fletcher (1798–1866), a man who settled in Indiana early in the state's history and went on to become an attorney and senator. The bust stands 47.5 inches (121 centimeters) high, has a width of 20 inches (51 centimeters) and a depth of 10.25 inches (26.0 centimeters).

== Description ==
Calvin Fletcher is a marble statue that consists of a 17.5 inches (44 centimeters) high pedestal and a 30-inch (76-centimeter) bust of Calvin Fletcher. The bust portrays Calvin Fletcher's unsmiling face and formal attire. His gaze is forward. The bottom part of the bust turns into a narrow column that sits atop the larger portion of the pedestal base. The base is plain, save for spiral detailing on the proper left and proper right sides. Each spiral ends with a flower containing four evenly shaped petals. Below the spiraling the base widens slightly. Along the bottom of the proper front base, the words "CALVIN FLETCHER" have been carved and painted a gold color. These letters are each 2.5 inches tall. The sculpture sits inside a stone niche and a small gold plaque has been placed just beneath it. Although not attached to the sculpture, it describes the subject matter, stating:

CALVIN FLETCHER

BORN FEB. 14, 1788- DIED MAY 26, 1866

EARLY SETTLER AND LANDOWNER.

CONNECTED WITH SECOND STATE BANK.

AN ATTORNEY.

SERVED IN GENERAL ASSEMBLY 1826–1833.

== Historical information ==
Calvin Fletcher was an early settler in Indiana, traveling to Indianapolis in 1821 when he learned that it would be the new seat of Indiana government. He began a law practice in the fledgling city and was eventually elected to the state senate where he served for seven years. Fletcher was also a trustee of the Indianapolis city schools and a leader of the Masonic Center lodge. Fletcher was also considered a religious man and lent financial support to a large number of early churches in the Indianapolis area. These endeavors led him to become a prominent figure in Indianapolis society in the mid-1800s. He became known particularly for his anti-slavery stance and was regarded as a defender of the African American community in Indianapolis.

Calvin Fletcher represents a historical figure through the use of marble sculpture. Stone sculpture has been a form of artistic expression for centuries and marble was used frequently as a medium by ancient Greek and Roman cultures. Marble is often selected by artists for its translucent quality which can add realism to faces and figures. Marble that has been newly quarried is considered relatively soft and easier than other stones to sculpt. The carving process involves the use of various chisels and hammers to remove large chunks of the marble, then the artist continues to whittle away pieces of the stone until precise detail can be achieved.

=== Location history ===
Calvin Fletcher is currently located on the fourth floor of the Indiana Statehouse, on the west side of the building in the rotunda alcove. Prior to this, the bust was on display in a niche outside the south door to the senate chamber. In 2004, a proposal was submitted for a local artist to create a bust of the late Frank O'Bannon, and upon its completion, the Frank O'Bannon Bust was placed where the Calvin Fletcher Bust once stood. Since that time, it has remained on the fourth floor.

== See also ==
- George Rogers Clark (McLary)
- William H. English (Indianapolis)
- List of public art at the Indiana Statehouse
- Marble sculpture
