= Here I Grew Up =

Artwork by Garo Z. Antreasian

- The Statesmen
- Artist: Garo Z. Antreasian
- Year: 1962
- Type: Mosaic
- Dimensions: 760 cm × 2,100 cm (300 in × 840 in)
- Location: Indiana Government Center North, Indianapolis; 39.767°N 86.162°W
- Owner: State of Indiana

Here I Grew Up, is a public artwork by American artist Garo Z. Antreasian, located on the lower level of the Indiana Government Center North building, which is near Indianapolis, Indiana, United States. This mosaic depicting five stages of Abraham Lincoln's life in Indiana between the ages of 7 and 21 can be found on the west side of the building by the escalators leading down to the tunnel to Indiana Government Center South. The mosaic is located between the cafeteria's entrance and an automated teller machine.

== Description ==
Here I Grew Up is a mosaic mural on a travertine marble wall that measures 70 ft. in length and 25 ft. in height. It contains over 300,000 hand-cut pieces of Bysantine Smalti (Glass tiles) in 87 different hues. These tiles measure approximately 3/8" x 5/8" x 1/9" thick and were imported from Murano, Italy. The design for the mural was chosen as a winning entry for an art competition held in December 1959, by the Indiana State Office Building Commission. Antreasian's mural entry, along with Young Abe Lincoln (sculpture) by David Rubins, was selected by a jury to commemorate Abraham Lincoln's formative years in Indiana. Antreasian's full-scale color drawings of the Abraham Lincoln figures took six months to complete.

=== Fabrication ===
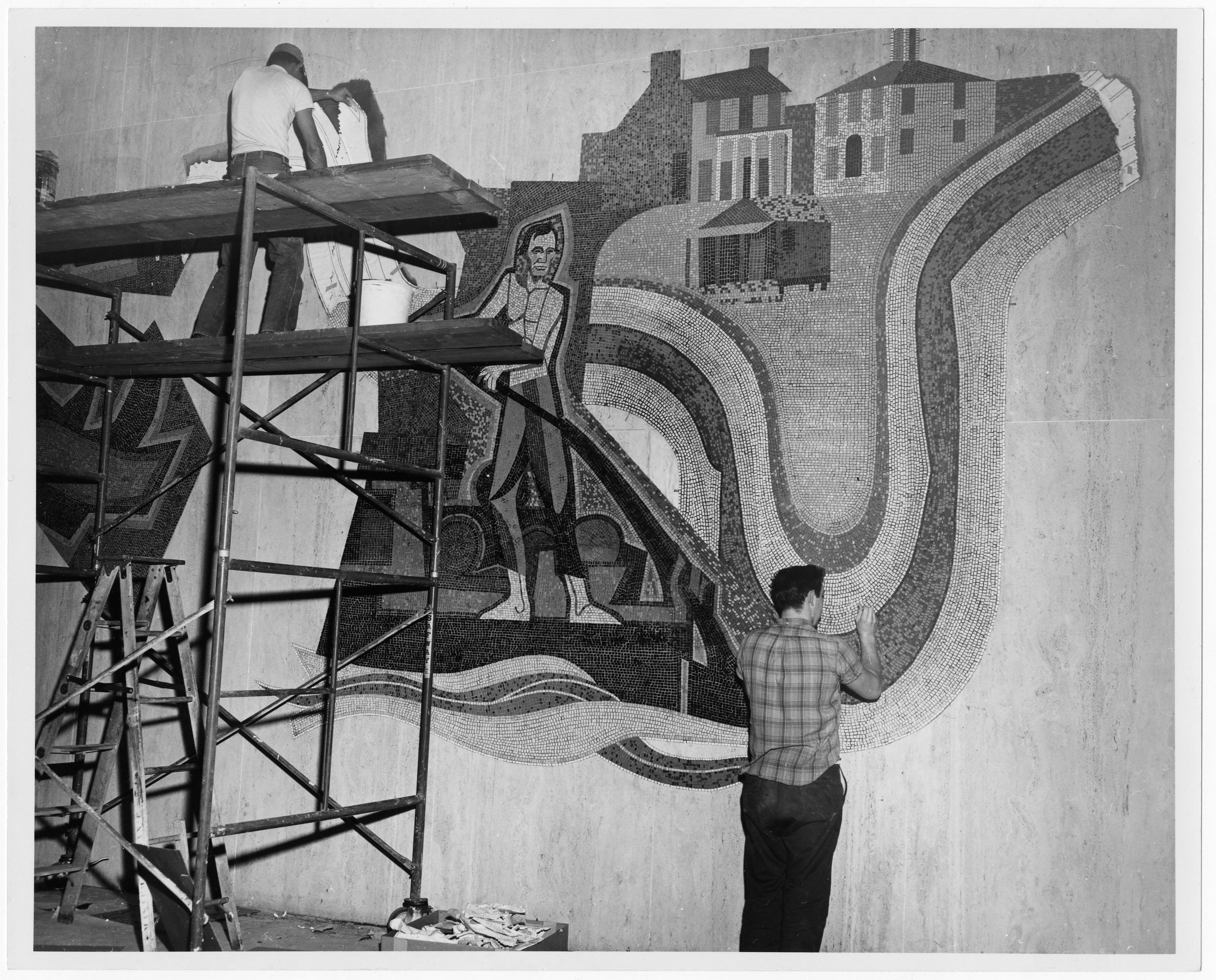
Fabrication in 1963

The fabrication of the mural was completed by Herron School of Art graduate Ralph Peck and his assistant, Mrs. Charles Pitts. Before Peck and his assistant began their work, the marble wall in the Indiana Government Center North was sandblasted to proper depth by using a full-size sketch of the mural as a guide. Peck and his assistant then affixed the glass tiles to the reverse side of Antreasian's sketches that were printed on a large roll of paper. The pair then cut out each Lincoln section, called a cartoon, and coded the square and rectangle pieces for coloring and positioning. It took one year to set the pieces in mortar.

Before the mosaic was unveiled to the public, lettering and brass edging for the mosaic figures were added to the wall. The title of the piece, "Here I Grew Up", is located right of center in gold, cursive letters with a height of 14.6 inches. "Here I Grew Up" is a quotation from Abraham Lincoln regarding his time spent in Indiana. Below the title, the following commemoration appear in brass letters that measure 3.1 inches in height: "Abraham Lincoln, our finest contribution to civilization shaped on the soil of Indiana from age 7 to 21". Original plans for the commemoration indicated a difference in Lincoln's age: "Abraham Lincoln, Our Finest Contribution to Civilization, Shaped on the Soil of Indiana From Age 8 to 21."

=== Scenes ===
Backwoods Stump Speaker

Flat Boat Trip to New Orleans

The scenes of Lincoln's life in Indiana form a map around the Ohio River:

- Backwoods Stump Speaker (bottom right): A barefoot, clean-shaven Lincoln holds his blue suspender with his proper right hand and points upward with his proper left hand. He wears a white, short-sleeved shirt and red pants with a hemline that falls above his ankles. He stands among a partially cleared forest, with at least four tree trunks. The Lincoln figure is silhouetted by a dark brown border, which gradually fades into a lighter gradient of brown tiles.
- Taking Grain to the Mill (top center): The next Lincoln figure straddles a white horse with a brown mane. This side profile of Lincoln, barefoot and clean-shaven, shows him wearing a peach-colored tank top with black pants that again hover above his ankles. He sits with one hand holding a book open, the other resting upon the back of the horse. Behind him, a red bag and sacks of grain are tied to the horse's back. Lincoln and the horse are outlined by a dark brown border and a lighter gradient of brown tiles. The pair are traveling through or posing in front of the town of Gentryville, Indiana which is depicted by four houses. The town name is labeled with capital letters. The single-story houses are three-dimensional with rectangles representing doors and windows. Two have chimneys.
- The Statesmen (top left): Lincoln appears as an adult in front of a waving American flag and a bald eagle. He stands, chest forward, with his arms at his side. He sports a full beard, a long, dark grey suit coat, black vest, white shirt, and black shoes. He holds a half-way rolled up document in his proper right hand.
- The Pensive Student (bottom left): Directly below the patriotic scene, Lincoln again appears as a youth, clean-shaven, but clothed in a yellow vest, a light brown long-sleeved shirt and red pants. He straddles a felled log, and his boots are calf-length. He holds a blue document or book, while his other hand supports his chin as he ponders.
- Flat Boat Trip to New Orleans (bottom center): A smaller stream juts out from the main body of the Ohio River. This stream is called Pigeon Creek, labeled with capital letters. Further on, a shirtless and barefoot Lincoln with a well-defined chest is gripping a long black stick with two hands as he propels himself on a raft along the waterway. At his feet rest abstract, geometric shapes that may represent his belongings. He wears blue pants with thick black stripes. In the background, a two-story home with four white pillars is present. Next to this house stands a two-story building with a red steeple, and a small, brown shack with a front porch. The buildings are surrounded by a green lawn.

A red and brown compass depicts cardinal directions with four large points and cursive letters: "W", "N", "E", and "S". Between each letter there are three smaller brown points. The compass has a dark brown circle in its center, with light brown, cream, and red rings.

== Historical information ==
Construction of Here I Grew Up and the Rubin sculpture of Lincoln was postponed for at least a year after the art competition by the Indiana State Office Building Commission. The mosaic alone cost $35,280 in 1962, leading some members of the commission, such as chairman Indiana Lieutenant Governor Crawford F. Parker, to oppose funding the art in order to allocate taxpayer money to social welfare projects. In 1961, one of the jury members who helped select the winning entries for the competition wrote to then Governor of Indiana, Matthew E. Welsh, on behalf of the mosaic and the statue of Lincoln:

We of the jury, and may others concerned, served without compensation even for our expenses because we, as thinking citizens of this state, feel that beautiful buildings demand the decorations indicated. The mural mosaic and the Lincoln statue which we selected would be a credit to any building and any state, and I feel that cutting cultural corners like this does much to throttle art in Indiana.

— A. Reid Winsey, Letter to Governor Welsh, May 1, 1961

=== Location history ===
After the mosaic was completed in the lobby of the State Office building, located west of the Indiana Statehouse, worker offices shared the space and fabric banners were mounted to reduce noise. With the office infrastructure and banners in place, only portions of the mosaic were visible. Plans were made in the late 1980s to demolish the lobby that housed the mosaic to make way for office expansion. The director of the Indiana State Office Building Commission, John C. Fleck, estimated that the removal and re-installation of the mural would cost $155,000. However, the building remains and is now called Indiana Government Center North. The $220 million office complex expansion resulted in the construction of a new office building, Indiana Government Center South; renovation of Indiana Government Center North, and two parking garages.

== Artist ==
Garo Z. Antreasian (1922 - 2018) was a native of Indianapolis, Indiana. His career began as an artist in World War II, where he was an artist-correspondent with the United States Coast Guard. Antreasian returned to Indianapolis in 1946, and graduated from the Herron School of Art in 1948. Beginning in the 1950s he was a faculty member at the Herron School of Art and he relocated to the University of New Mexico in 1970. He also was the technical director of the first modern lithography print shop, Tamarind Lithography Workshop, in Los Angeles, California.

Before designing Here I Grew Up, Antreasian completed several projects around the city of Indianapolis and the state of Indiana that depicted Indiana history and landmarks. In 1956, he was commissioned by Indiana University to design a mural about the history of the school since its founding in 1820.

== See also ==
- List of public art at the Indiana Statehouse
- Spirit of Indiana
