= Bust of Daniel W. Voorhees =

Sculpture by James Paxton Voorhees

Daniel W. Voorhees
- Artist: James P. Voorhees
- Year: c. 905-1909
- Type: Plaster bust
- Dimensions: 46 cm × 69 cm × 79 cm (18 in × 27 in × 31 in)
- Location: Indiana Statehouse, Indianapolis; 39°46′8.4″N 86°9′46.8″W
- Owner: State of Indiana

Daniel W. Voorhees is a public artwork by American artist James Paxton Voorhees, located on the second floor alcove of the Indiana Statehouse behind the tourism desk. The statehouse is located in Indianapolis, Indiana, United States. Daniel W. Voorhees, nicknamed the "Tall Sycamore of the Wabash" for his tall stature, large head and broad shoulders, was a distinguished Indiana politician of the 19th century.

== Description ==
Daniel W. Voorhees is a plaster sculpture that has been painted white. The bust measures 31 inches (79 cm) by 27 inches (69 cm) by 18 inches (46 cm). Voorhees gazes slightly upward to his proper left, and his proper right eyebrow is raised. His hair is combed away from a side part on the proper left of his scalp. His handlebar moustache obscures his mouth and reaches his chin in length. A frock coat with a notched lapel is worn over a vest and a high-collared shirt buttoned up to the neck, where a stock-tie is fastened into a bow. The bust sits upon a pedestal of olive branches that partially envelope a coat of arms or crest, which feature eleven stars and seven stripes.

A plaque beneath the bust provides the following information: "Daniel Wolsey Voorhees; born 9-26-1827 – died 4-9-1897; Congressman 1861–1865, 1868–1873; United States Senator 1877–1897; Trial lawyer; Orator; Proponent for the Library of Congress."

== Historical information ==
The artist of Daniel W. Voorhees was Daniel W. Voorhees' son, James P. Voorhees (1855–1936). The younger Voorhees spent 21 years as a secretary for his father. After the elder Voorhees' death in 1897, James P. Voorhees completed a bust of his father to memorialize his contribution to the establishment of the Library of Congress, which included planning and championing for the cause as chairman of a Senate committee. The bust was presented to Governor James Frank Hanly (1905–1909) for the Indiana Statehouse.

=== Location history ===
In 1943, Daniel W. Voorhees was located on the southeast corner pier of the third floor of the Indiana Statehouse, facing south. It was accompanied by Indiana, a sculpture which was located in the southwest corner pier. At the time, all other niches on the third floor were empty. By 1982, in the northwest corner pier, Indiana State Stone joined Indiana and the bust of Voorhees on the third floor.

An additional copy of Daniel W. Voorhees can be found at the Vigo County Historical Society in Terre Haute, Indiana. This bust was donated to the Emeline Fairbanks Memorial Library in Terre Haute in 1906.

== Artist ==
James P. Voorhees was a sculptor, an actor, and a published author. He completed a bust of the ninth Vice President of the United States, Richard Mentor Johnson, in 1895. The bust was placed in a niche in the United States Senate chamber. A year later, James P. Voorhees was nominated to sculpt a bust of the 14th Vice President of the United States, John C. Breckinridge. James P. Voorhees also completed busts of Thomas Jefferson and Napoleon Bonaparte.

=== Actor ===
In September 1897, five months after his father's death, James P. Voorhees performed a series of lecture-monologues with a style of oratory that reminded audience members of the senior Voorhees. A year later, James P. Voorhees started work on a bill to support the establishment of a national theater in Washington, D.C. The bill garnered endorsements from prominent actors of the time, such as Richard Mansfield, Henry Irving, E.H. Sothern, Henry E. Dixey, and Frank Daniels. It was introduced to the United States House of Representatives by Mr. Miers of Indiana on December 18, 1902.

=== Author ===
James P. Voorhees was a published author of several works of poetry and stories, including Caverns of Dawn (1910). His work, Flaws: A Story of Hoosierlands (1925) was written while living at the Hendrix Hotel in Plainfield, Indiana, later known as the Van Buren Hotel. James P. Voorhees also corresponded with James Whitcomb Riley, known as the “Hoosier Poet.”
