= Wendell Willkie (relief) =

Public sculpture by Paul Fjelde

Wendell Willkie (Fjelde)
- Artist: Paul Fjelde
- Type: Bronze
- Dimensions: 128.9 cm × 84.5 cm × 2.5 cm (50.75 in × 33.25 in × 1 in)
- Location: Indiana Statehouse; Indianapolis, Indiana, United States; 39°46′7.54″N 86°9′45.54″W
- Owner: State of Indiana

Wendell Willkie plaque is a public sculpture at the Indiana Statehouse in Indianapolis, Indiana, and was designed by American sculptor and educator Paul Fjelde. This bronze plaque honors Wendell L. Willkie (1892–1944) who was the Republican Party nominee for the U.S. presidency in 1940. The plaque was placed in the Statehouse rotunda on February 18, 1950. The inscription on the bottom of the plaque was taken from Willkie's book "One World" which calls for unified world order.

== Description ==
At the top of the plaque is Willkie's name and the dates of his birth and death, February 18, 1892 – October 8, 1944. A silhouetted image of Willkie is facing proper left and is located in the center of the plaque. In this image Willkie is clean shaven and wearing a suit and tie. Inscriptions beneath the image describe Willkie as a "Distinguished citizen of our state and our country", a lawyer and an industrialist, the author of "One World," and the nominee of the Republican party for President of the United States in 1940. Under the description in an eagle and beneath it is an inscription from Willkie's book "One World" that reads:

I believe in America

Because in it we are free—free to choose our government

and speak our minds to observe our different religions

because we hate no people and covet no peoples land

because we have great dreams and because we have the

opportunity to make those dreams come true.

The plaque measures 50.75 inches × 33.25 inches × 1 inch. The artist's signature is located on the front, proper right, bottom of the plaque. It reads, "Paul Fjelde•sc." On May 15, 2006, the Indiana State Museum listed this plaque as in excellent condition.

== Historical information ==
The Wendell Willkie plaque was placed in the Indiana Statehouse rotunda on February 18, 1950, which was the 58th anniversary of Willkie's birth. Approximately 500 people were in attendance to witness the dedication of the bronze plaque and to salute Willkie. Members of Willkie's family were also in attendance, including his widow, son, and brother: Mrs. Edith Willkie, Philip Willkie, and H. Frederick Willkie. The plaque was placed on the main floor of the Indiana Statehouse rotunda in the southwest pier facing a bronze plaque bearing "The American's Creed". Indiana Governor Henry F. Schricker accepted the plaque on behalf of the people of Indiana. An Indianapolis youth, Jack Scott, had the honor of pulling the veil from the plaque.

During the dedication ceremony a Statehouse employee, William Holmes, fell from a ladder and broke his arm while checking the veil hung over the plaque.

Willkie was born and raised in Elwood, Indiana, where both of his parents were lawyers. He attended Elwood High School and later graduated from Indiana University. While at the university he became a member the Beta Theta Pi fraternity.

The idea for the plaque was conceived by Mrs. Ed Toner of Anderson, Indiana. Her son, William Toner, was a close friend of Willkie and the publisher of the Anderson Herald. Mrs. Toner wanted the plaque to be from the common man of Madison County, whom Willkie loved. But they were not able to operate a fund-raising campaign on their own, so the assistance of the Junior Chamber of Commerce in Elwood, Anderson, and Alexandria was accepted in order to raise the $2,500 needed for the memorial. Donations were collected both large and small, some in the form of pennies and nickels. School children contributed approximately ten percent of the funds raised.

The creator of this Wendell Willkie plaque was Paul Fjelde (August 12, 1892 – May 3, 1984) of New York City, born in Minneapolis, Minnesota. Fjelde is also the creator of two other Wendell Willkie plaques, one located in the Summit County Courthouse in Akron, Ohio, and the other in New York City. To create the plaque, Fjelde first carved Willkie's likeness into clay using a picture as a reference. From this clay carving the bronze plaque was cast using the lost-wax casting technique.

== See also ==
- One World (book)
- Frances Elizabeth Willard (Taft)
- Henry F. Schricker (Rubins)
- Plaque Commemorating First Formal Religious Service, Indianapolis (Howard Petty)
- Sarah T. Bolton Relief
- List of public art at the Indiana Statehouse
