= Peglow =

Peglow is a surname. Notable people with the surname include:

- João Peglow (born 2002), Brazilian footballer
- Richard Peglow (fl. early 21st cntury), American artist, creator of the Bust of Benjamin Harrison
