= John Minta =

American politician

John Henry Minta
- John Minta

Town Council
- In office January 1, 1984 – June 1, 2006
- Succeeded by: Greg Isgrigg

Town Council President
- In office January 1, 1997 – June 1, 2006
- Succeeded by: Paul Kraft

Personal details
- Born: 1941 Clarksville, Indiana
- Died: June 1, 2006 (aged 64–65) Clarksville, Indiana
- Party: Democratic

John Henry Minta (1941 – June 1, 2006) was a politician of Clarksville, Indiana, where he was involved with the town's government for 32 years and nicknamed Mr. Clarksville. During his time with the town's government he served on the Parks Board, Town Council, and was the Council President.

== Biography ==
John Minta was born in Clarksville in 1941 and remained a citizen of the town for his entire life. He served in the Vietnam War in the Air Force, and after returning home eventually becoming a banker with Liberty National Bank before his retirement. He served as a head basketball coach for a local church for 35 years. Minta began his involvement with the town's government by serving on the Parks Board from 1974 to 1984.

In 1984 he became elected to the Town Council. In 1997 he served as the Town Council President until his death in June 2006. He was serving in his 19th year on the council and his 9th year as Council President. During his tenure on the council he was credited with helping revitalize the George Rogers Clark Cabin, construction of a commercial district known as Veterans Parkway, building a new Town Hall, revitalizing the Lewis and Clark Parkway commercial district, construction of the Clarksville Sewage Treatment Plant, and extensive effort with the Falls of the Ohio Interpretive Center in which they named a room after him for his devotion to the project. Minta also worked on the Clarksville War Memorial project and the Wooded View Golf Course located next to Lapping Park. He also helped in the planning of the Ohio River Greenway project prior to his death, in which the revitalization of the George Rogers Clark cabin was a part of the Greenway project.

John Minta was discovered dead after he failed to show up for work at the Town Hall and his neighbor and Town Attorney Sam Gwin decided to check up on him. When the back door was found unlocked Sam Gwin called the police in which the police discovered Mr. Minta deceased in a chair with the TV still on. The same day the local newspaper The Evening News printed an article titled Mr. Clarksville dies at 65.

After the passing of John Minta, Vice President Councilman Paul Kraft was named the Council President, Bob Popp became Vice-President and Greg Isgrigg was nominated by the precinct committeemen to finish Minta's term.

== See also ==
- Clarksville, Indiana
- George Rogers Clark (McLary)
