= Statue of George Washington (Indianapolis) =

Public artwork by Donald De Lue

George Washington
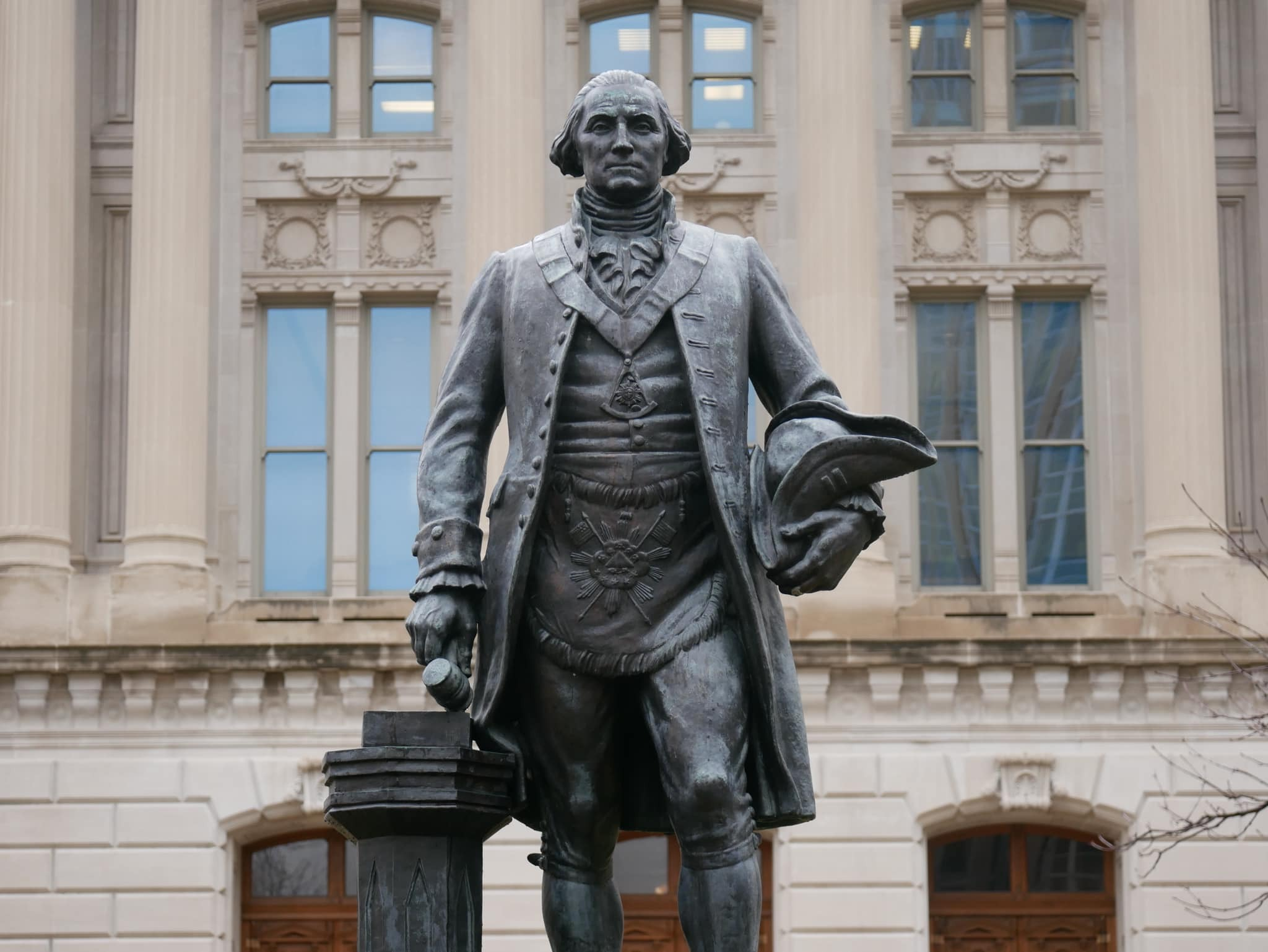
- Artist: Donald De Lue
- Year: 1959, dedicated 1987
- Type: bronze statue
- Dimensions: 280 cm × 120 cm × 91 cm (112 in × 46 in × 36 in)
- Location: Indiana Statehouse; Indianapolis, IN; 39°46′3.33″N 86°9′45.66″W
- Owner: State of Indiana

George Washington (alternately titled George Washington as Master Mason) is a public artwork by American sculptor Donald De Lue, located on the grounds of the Indiana Statehouse, in Indianapolis, Indiana, United States. The bronze statue of George Washington that occupies the Indiana Statehouse south lawn is one of several copies of a 1959 original wax cast at the Modern Art Foundry in Long Island, New York.

== Description ==
The statue depicts Washington dressed in breeches with an apron and medallion decorated with Masonic symbols. Washington holds a tri-cornered hat in the crook of his proper left arm, and a gavel in his proper right hand. He wears an open overcoat with buttons and has a short podium to his proper right. Washington's attire depicts the first President as he may have looked when he laid the cornerstone for the U.S. Capitol in Washington, D.C. The sculpture is mounted upon a stepped, inscribed granite base.
The base of the sculpture is inscribed with the following:

- Northwest corner of sculpture: Donald De Lue Sc. 1959
- Northeast corner of sculpture, east side, lower rear: The Modern Art Foundry, Inc. (Foundry mark) 1986 New York, New York
- Front/south side of base: GEORGE WASHINGTON PRESIDENT OF THE UNITED STATES/1789-1797; First in War, First in Peace, First in the Hearts of His Countrymen
- West side of base: Observe good faith and justice toward all nations. Cultivate peace and/harmony with all. Religion and/morality enjoin this conduct./George Washington
- East side of base: My attachment to the Society of which we are members will dispose me to contribute my best endeavors to promote the honor and interests of the Craft./ George Washington, Freemason 1753–1799
- North side of base: (Masonic symbol, square and compass) Presented to the People of Indiana From the Freesmasons of Indiana/George Washington Commission/The Grand Lodge Free and Accepted Masons of the State of Indiana/May 19, 1987

The dimensions of the statue are as follows: 9 feet 4 inches (2.84 meters) by 46 inches (120 centimeters) x 36 inches (91 centimeters). The total weight of the statue is 900 pounds (410 kilograms). The granite base is 5 feet (1.5 meters) tall and weighs approximately 9 short tons (8.2 metric tons). The Statehouse's version of De Lue's bronze statue was a gift of the Grand Lodge of Free and Accepted Masons of Indiana, dedicated May 19, 1987. This statue appeared at similar Masonic monuments in the following locations:

- Detroit, Michigan (1966)
- Lansing, Michigan (1982)
- Lexington, Massachusetts
- Alexandria, Virginia (1966)
- Wallingford, Connecticut (1965)
- Flushing Meadows Corona Park, Queens, New York
- New Orleans, Louisiana (1959).

A Smithsonian's Save Outdoor Sculpture survey completed in October 1992 noted the condition as 'well-maintained'.

== Historical information ==
George Washington as Master Mason was sculpted initially from a wax mold at Donald De Lue's studio in Leonardo, New Jersey, and copyrighted in 1959. This sculpture was re-cast in 1986 and dedicated May 19, 1987 by the grand master of the Freemasons of Indiana, J.C. Paxton of Warsaw, Indiana. The total cost of the gift was $100,000. Lieutenant Governor John Mutz accepted the statue on behalf of the state. George Washington as Master Mason was inspired by sculptor Bryant Baker's work, Illustrious Brother George Washington, which also depicts the subject in a similar pose with Masonic iconography.

== See also ==
- Christopher Columbus (Vittori)
- List of statues of George Washington
- List of sculptures of presidents of the United States
