= Indiana state stone (sculpture) =

Public sculpture at the Indiana Statehouse in downtown Indianapolis

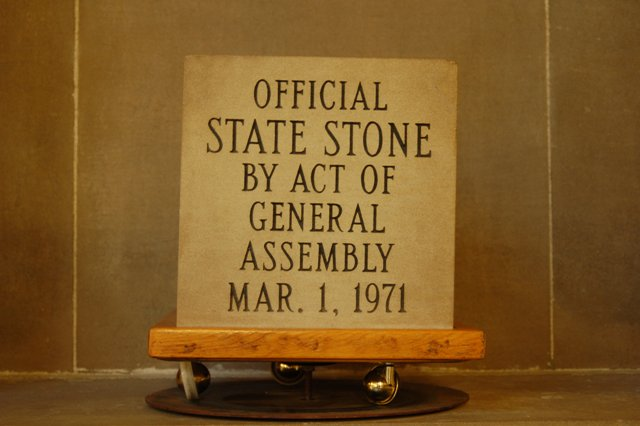
- Artist: Unknown
- Type: Limestone
- Dimensions: 41.3 cm × 41 cm × 41 cm (16.25 in × 16 in × 16 in)
- Location: Indiana Statehouse; Indianapolis, Indiana, United States; 39°46′7″N 86°9′46″W
- Owner: State of Indiana

Indiana state stone is a public sculpture at the Indiana Statehouse in downtown Indianapolis. It is an 85-pound (39 kg) cube of Indiana limestone that is mounted on a wooden, rotating dolly. It was carved from limestone quarried from the P. M. & B. limestone quarry located in southern Indiana. This sculpture commemorates limestone becoming Indiana's official state stone on March 1, 1971.

== Description ==
The Indiana state stone sculpture is the Indiana Statehouse's only piece of kinetic art. The engraved limestone cube sits atop a dolly that rotates 360 degrees so that individuals can spin it in order to read the inscriptions that are carved into the five visible sides of the six-sided sculpture. Each of the visible sides has separate inscriptions observing aspects of the limestone industry in Indiana. One side notes that Bedford, Indiana is the "limestone capital of the world", another names P. M. & B. the quarry from which the stone for this sculpture was extracted, and yet another side commemorates March 1, 1971 as the day limestone became Indiana's official state stone.

The dolly on which the limestone block sits consists of an oak base with three metal casters attached to the bottom. A metal bar is attached to the center of the underside of the wooden base which connects to a circular steel plate. The metal bar acts as a pivot point for the dolly to turn. The steel plate was once coated in black enamel, which has been worn away by its interaction with the three caster wheels. Little black enamel remains.

The entire sculpture, including the dolly, measures 16.25 in × 16 in. The cube of limestone measures 12 7/16 in on all sides. The oak base is 14 5/8 in × 14 5/8 in. The caster wheels are 2 3/8 in tall. The steel plate upon which the caster wheels rotate is 16 inches in diameter. The block of limestone weighs 85 pounds (39 kg).

== Historical information ==
The Indiana state stone sculpture was created and displayed at the Indiana Statehouse to commemorate limestone becoming Indiana's official state stone on March 1, 1971, by the Indiana General Assembly. Limestone was designated the state stone in order to honor Indiana limestone usage across the nation in many famous structures.

The limestone House Bill 1202 designated limestone as the official state stone. The two legislators that sponsored the bill were Maurice Chase of Bedford and Stephen Ferguson of Bloomington, Indiana. Ferguson jokingly claimed to have no real objection to the bill, while Chase had 30 years experience working in stone mills until he retired. Chase is claimed to have drawn attention to the bill by handing out tiny Indiana maps made of limestone. He is quoted in saying, “Limestone has been used for so many famous structures. It seemed appropriate to have it named the state stone.”

The Indiana state stone sculpture has been located in a niche on the fourth floor of the Indiana Statehouse between the Senate and the House of Representatives chambers since at least March 5, 1983. The cube was cut to dimension using a modern diamond belt saw.

=== P. M. & B. (Perry, Matthews, & Buskirk) Quarry ===
The P. M. & B. (Perry, Matthews & Buskirk) quarry is located approximately one mile north of the town of Oolitic, Indiana and approximately three miles northwest of the city of Bedford, IN. This area is known as the Stone Belt; a 20 mile wide vein of limestone that runs through both Monroe and Lawrence counties. The P. M. & B. quarry company was organized on February 15, 1889, and development of the quarry began directly afterward.

The original members of the company were William N. Matthews, Fred Matthews, Henry F. Perry, Captain Gilbert K. Perry, Sarah E. Matthews, and Phillip K. Buskirk. The original members of the company had it incorporated on July 13, 1893. The original members claimed to have put every cent they could scrap together into developing their first plot of land. The members boasted that if their land did not produce the highest grade of stone, they would have surely gone bankrupt.

The company owned a total of 898 acres of land, of which only 240 acres were developable stone land. The original machinery used to excavate the quarry consisted of one channeling machine and a derrick. By 1895 the company had 10 machines running around the clock and was shipping between 10 and 15 car loads of stone each day on the Monon Railroad.

The P. M. & B. Quarry was sold to the Consolidated Stone Company in 1897 for $600,000. In the 1920s individuals representing twenty-four of the limestone industry's companies came together to form one entity. This entity became the Indiana Limestone Company and was founded in 1926. Today the Indiana Limestone Company owns over 2,300 acres of land and still owns and operates the P. M. & B. quarry as well as the famous Empire hole.

=== Limestone of the P. M. & B. Quarry ===
The fine-grained limestone quarried at the P. M. & B. quarry is commonly referred to as Indiana Limestone, named after the state where it is quarried. Indiana Limestone is more formally termed Salem limestone, which is the name of the geologic formation that consists of this carbonate rock. Salem Limestone is a grain stone that is Mississippian in age. The limestone at the P. M. & B. Quarry is 98.40 percent calcium carbonate, making it more pure than the average Salem Limestone in Indiana, which averages approximately 97 percent calcium carbonate.

Throughout most of the P. M. & B. quarry the limestone has a uniform fine grain, with only a few irregular patches of coarser grained and crystalline stone. The fine grained oolitic limestone that is quarried from this site is covered by a layer of Mitchell limestone in some places. Although this covering layer can be difficult to remove by quarry workers, it has acted as a protective barrier for the underlying oolitic limestone and aides in preserving its high quality.

The Indiana Statehouse not only houses the Indiana state stone sculpture, it is also clad in Salem Limestone. 35 out of the 50 Statehouses around the country also use Salem Limestone quarried by the Indiana Limestone Company. The P. M. & B. Quarry is most famous for the Empire hole. This particular hole was the source of limestone used for the Empire State Building in New York City. 35,017,500 pounds of limestone block were extracted from this part of the quarry in 1931 and shipped to Manhattan for the 102-story building. The Empire hole was also the source of stone used for the Empire State Building's 2001 renovations.

== Condition ==
The tread of one of the three caster wheels is missing, making the sculpture slightly lopsided. There is discoloration of the limestone on all top and bottom corners, likely from the oils of people's hands while they touch the block in order to spin it. The steel plate's black enamel is worn away in most areas. The top four corners of the cube have been worn or broken away since 1983.

== See also ==
- List of public art at the Indiana Statehouse
- List of U.S. state minerals, rocks, stones and gemstones
- List of Indiana state symbols
