= Tulip to Life =

- Artist: Eric Ernstberger
- Year: 1991
- Type: Sculpture
- Dimensions: 110 cm × 440 cm × 530 cm (42 in × 172 in × 207 in)
- Location: Indianapolis; 39°46′4.92″N 86°9′52.48″W

Tulip to Life is a public artwork located on the grounds of the Indiana Government Center South in Indianapolis, Indiana, United States. The functional sculpture is a drinking fountain made of stainless steel in the shape of a tulip tree leaf. Designed by Eric Ernstberger of Muncie, Indiana, and fabricated by Tarpenning-LaFollette of Indianapolis, Indiana, the sculpture was installed in 1991.

== Description ==
The sculpture depicts an oversized leaf of the American tulip tree, Indiana's state tree. The sculpture consists of two main segments: the leaf, which forms the main body and majority of the piece, and the petiole-and-bowl segment, which houses the drinking fountain. Measured diagonally from the foremost tips of the leaf segment to the back of the fountain bowl, it is about 207 inches (530 cm) long.

The leaf segment is approximately 172 inches (440 cm) at the widest point and rises about 16 inches (41 cm) off the ground at its highest point. It is made from sections of sheeted stainless steel, overlapped and bolted together using brass bolts and acorn nuts, supported by rib-like structures on the underside, and curled to mimic the organic shape of a leaf. It is completed by a long piece of stainless steel which forms the midrib of the leaf. The entire leaf segment is held slightly off the ground on support bars of varying length. A series of small electric lights is arranged under it in order to produce a glow from underneath at night.

The petiole-and-bowl segment stands independently of the leaf section, but is positioned to give the impression that the midrib continues into the petiole. It rises approximately 42 inches (110 cm) off the ground, not including the water spigot. The stainless steel petiole structure stands atop a small stone base and supports the main bowl structure, which is made of copper. A thick, slightly irregular, oblong ring of limestone forms the lip of the drinking fountain basin. The spigot itself is an ordinary manufactured fixture; it is attached to the central copper portion of the bowl.

== Location history ==
An example of site-specific art, the tulip tree leaf is the main focal point of a below-ground-level rectangular courtyard surrounded by the Indiana Government Center South's architecture. The courtyard is accessible via an ornamental stairway on the north end, as well as by a set of entrance doors on the south end. The piece itself is located on the south end of the courtyard.

== Historical information ==
Installed in 1991, the piece was conceptualized and designed by Eric Ernstberger of Rundell Ernstberger Associates, an urban design and landscape architecture firm based in Muncie, Indiana. It was fabricated under the direction of Jan R. Martin of Tarpenning-LaFollette, a custom sheet metal products contractor based in Indianapolis.

== Condition ==
A 1993 survey by the Smithsonian American Art Museum's "Save Outdoor Sculpture!" initiative described the piece as "well maintained."

== See also ==
- List of public art at the Indiana Statehouse
