= Robert Dale Owen Memorial =

Public artwork in Indianapolis, Indiana

- Artist: Frances M. Goodwin
- Year: 1911
- Type: Bronze
- Location: Indiana Statehouse grounds, Indianapolis, IN; 39°46′4.06″N 86°9′45.62″W
- Owner: State of Indiana

Robert Dale Owen Memorial is a public artwork located at the south entrance of the Indiana Statehouse along Washington Street in Indianapolis, Indiana. The memorial was donated to the state of Indiana and dedicated in 1911 in honor of the Indiana politician, Robert Dale Owen (1807–1877). The bronze portrait bust by Indiana sculptor, Frances M. Goodwin, has been missing from this memorial since 1970. The memorial's remaining pedestal is made from three stone blocks and includes a commemorative plaque.

== Description ==
The 200-pound bronze bust of a bearded Robert Dale Owen was once centered on the top of a stone pedestal; however, the bust is missing from the memorial. The remaining pedestal faces the south entrance of the Indiana Statehouse. It is composed of three stone blocks and stands 70 inches high. The lowest block is 45.5 inches wide, 42.5 inches deep, and 10 inches tall; the middle block measures 32 inches wide, 28.5 inches deep, and 10 inches tall; and the top block is 24 inches wide, 21.5 inches deep, and 50 tall. A memorial plaque, which is centered on the face in the middle of the top block and measures 20 inches by 24 inches, reads:

1801-1877 / An Appreciation / Erected in the honor of Robert Dale Owen by the Women of Indiana in recognition of his efforts to obtain for them educational privileges and legal rights. / author, statesman, politician, philanthropist / "Write me as one who loved his fellow man.

== Location ==
In 1905, the Robert Dale Owen Memorial Association was granted permission from the Indiana state government to place a memorial to Owen in the rotunda of the Indiana Statehouse. The present-day memorial, which includes only the remaining pedestal, is installed on the Statehouse grounds, facing the southern entrance to the building. The memorial was dedicated in 1911.

== Historical information ==
The artist at work

In 1905, during the women's movement of the early twentieth century, fundraising efforts began to erect a memorial to Robert Dale Owen, who was known for his early legislative efforts in Indiana in the mid-1800s to protect women's property rights and provide women with greater freedom in divorce, as well as his support of women's suffrage. The memorial was also intended to draw attention to the ongoing struggle for women's suffrage. The Memorial Association hoped to raise $2,000 to $2,500 for the commission of a bust and memorial. Artist Frances Goodwin was chosen to create the bust. After Goodwin's clay model was approved by the Memorial Association and by Owen's son, Ernest Dale Owen, the final bronze bust was cast in Paris.

Although the state government granted the Robert Dale Owen Memorial Association permission to place a memorial in the rotunda of the Statehouse in 1905, the completed work was not formally dedicated until 1911. The memorial was presented to the State of Indiana on March 8, 1911, "as a lasting memorial to a man who for many years persistently labored to secure just laws concerning the educational and property rights of women." The governor of Indiana, members of the Indiana General Assembly, and Owen's great-grandniece, Martha Fitton, attended the dedication.

The original memorial included Goowin's bronze portrait bust of Owen on a stone pedestal that included a commemorative plaque. On September 19, 1970, the portrait bust was stolen, and the present-day memorial is installed outside on the Statehouse grounds. It faces the southern entrance to the building where it was dedicated in 1911.

=== The Robert Dale Owen Memorial Association ===
The Federated Women's Club of Indiana formed the Robert Dale Owen Memorial Association on June 30, 1905, to urge the women of Indiana to help raise funds for a memorial to Robert Dale Owen. The Association consisted of ten women from Indiana, led by Julia Conklin. The group published at least two pamphlets that were distributed around the state to inform others about their efforts. Robert Dale Owen and What He Did for Women of Indiana offered a brief biography of the politician. Another pamphlet appealed to the women of the state to help in fundraising efforts, explained why women should care about a memorial for Owen, and presented many avenues for donation. The Association also offered to send its members to meetings of Indiana women's clubs to speak about the life and legacy of Robert Dale Owen in an effort to help raise funds for the memorial.

George B. Lockwood sold autographed copies of his book, New Harmony Communities, and donated the proceeds to the cause. Julia Conklin did the same with her book, The Young People's History of Indiana. The Women's Club of New Harmony, Indiana, was the largest contributing group, raising $50 for the fund.

In their final meeting on December 30, 1912, Association member Julia Sharpe presented her official record of the work accomplished by the group. The report included illustrations of each member of the Association and a reproduction of Goodwin's memorial bust. The Association gave a bound volume of the report to the Indiana State Library for future reference.

== Artist ==
Frances Murphy Goodwin (1855–1929) was born in Newcastle, Indiana, and was a member of one of the city's oldest families. Goodwin and her sister, Helen, were well known in Indiana artist circles. Goodwin briefly attended The Indiana Art School before moving to the Art Institute of Chicago to study painting. At Chicago she discovered her love for sculpting and eventually worked as a student under the sculptor Lorado Taft. Goodwin also studied sculpture at the Art Student's League in New York City with the sculptor Daniel Chester French. Goodwin eventually traveled in Europe, where she studied art for four and a half years, and established an art studio in Paris with her sister. Goodwin died at Newcastle at the age of seventy-four. A year later, in 1930, the Henry County Historical Society planned to commission a memorial for their grounds dedicated to Frances Goodwin and modeled after a bird fountain she had created at the Newcastle Public Library.

=== Art career ===
Frances Goodwin's first commission was for Education, a sculpture displayed in the Indiana building at the World's Columbian Exposition in 1893, and earned an honorable mention for the work. The sculpture was later installed in the Office of the Governor of Indiana. Goodwin's other works include a marble statue of Schuyler Colfax in the Senate gallery at the U.S. Capitol and a bronze memorial of Captain Everet Benjamin in New York. Her busts of Newcastle poet, Benjamin S. Parker, and Indianapolis rector, Reverend James D. Stanley, displayed at the Historical Society of Henry County and the Herron School of Art in Indianapolis. Goodwin also sculpted many studies of baby hands, which were popular with the public.

After living in Paris for a few years, she returned to the United States, when she won the competition for the commission of the Robert Dale Owen Memorial. Goodwin opened a temporary studio in Indianapolis, where she created the clay mold of the future artwork; however, she returned to Paris to cast the final bronze bust.

== See also ==
- Frances Elizabeth Willard
- Hendricks Monument
- Oliver P. Morton and Reliefs
- Untitled (Mueller)
- George Washington (bust by Houdon)
