= Frances M. Goodwin =

American sculptor

- Born: 1855; Newcastle, Indiana
- Died: 1929 (aged 73–74); Newcastle, Indiana
- Known for: Sculpture

Frances M. Goodwin (1855–1929) was an American sculptor born in Newcastle, Indiana. Goodwin began her studies in Indianapolis, briefly studying at the Indiana Art Association, and then at the Chicago Art Institute where she studied with Lorado Taft and then at the Art Students League under Daniel Chester French.

Her statue representing "Education" was exhibited at the 1893 Columbian Exposition, in the Indiana State Building.

She died in Newcastle, Indiana, the town in which she was born, in 1929.

== Selected works ==
- Bust of Vice President Schuyler Colfax, marble, (ca. 1897) United States Capitol, District of Columbia
- Bust of Benjamin Parker, Henry County Historical Society, New Castle, Indiana
- Robert Dale Owen, Indiana State House, Indianapolis, Indiana, (1911) The bust disappeared in the 1970s
- Eve, created with Robert William Davidson, Indiana University-Purdue University at Indianapolis, Indianapolis, Indiana, first exhibited at the 1933 Chicago World's Fair
- bust of Captain Everett, Riverhead Cemetery, New York
