= Thomas E. Saunders =

American politician from Indiana

Tom Saunders
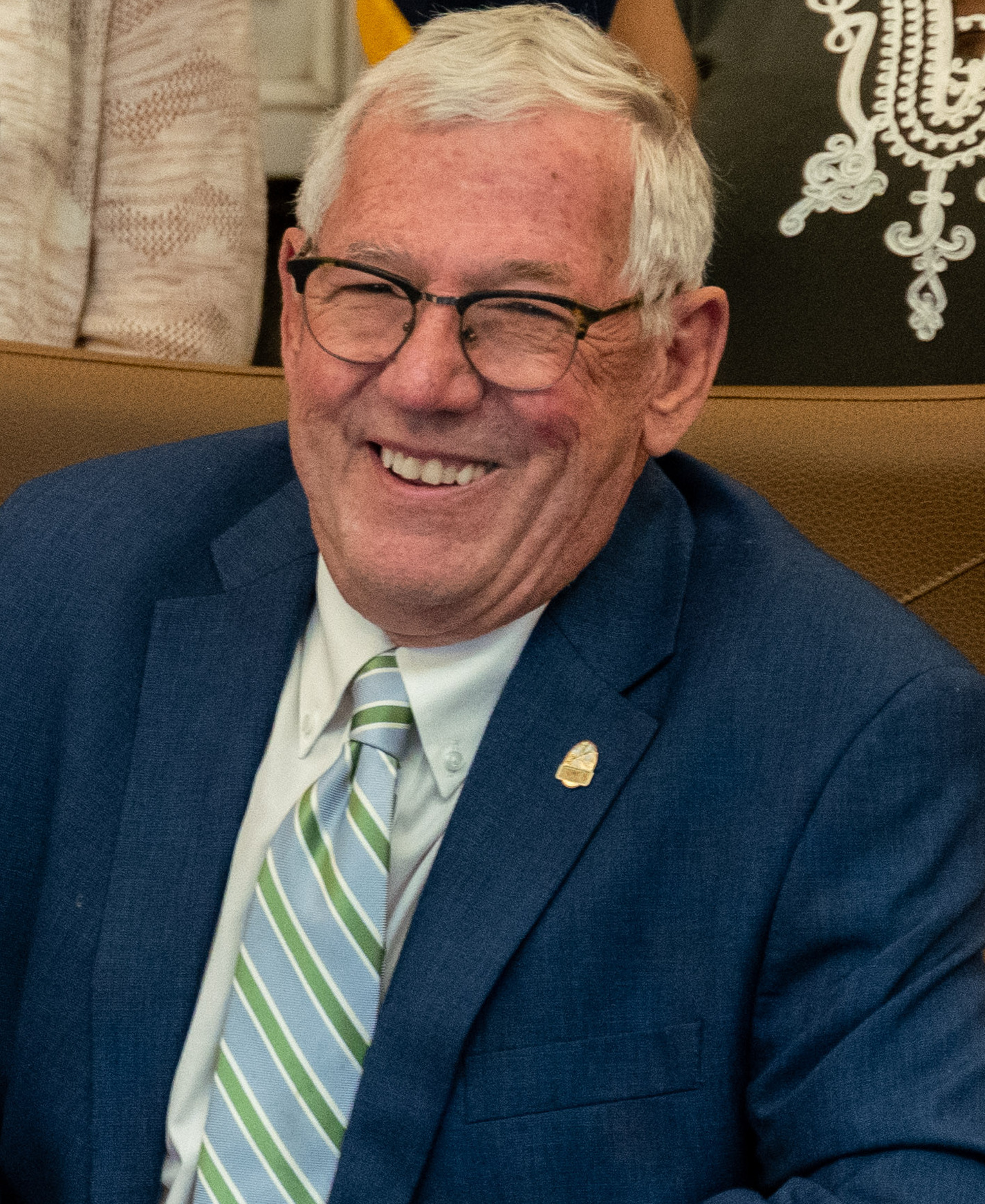

Member of the Lewisville Town Council
- Incumbent
- Assumed office 2024

Member of the Indiana House of Representatives from the 54th district
- In office November 6, 1996 – November 22, 2022
- Preceded by: David Copenhaver
- Succeeded by: Cory Criswell

Personal details
- Born: June 28, 1951 (age 75) Lewisville, Indiana
- Party: Independent (2023–present); Republican (until 2023)
- Spouse: Sue
- Children: 2

Thomas E. "Tom" Saunders (born June 28, 1951) is an American politician. He was a member of the Indiana House of Representatives from the 54th District, serving from 1996 to 2022. He is a member of the Republican party. He served as Chair of the Henry County Republican Party for 6 years and as its Vice Chair for 5 years. He also served as Henry County Assessor for 16 years. Saunders retired in 2022 after serving the district for twenty-five years. He ran the next election cycle for Lewisville town council and won as an independent.
