= Bust of William H. English =

William H. English
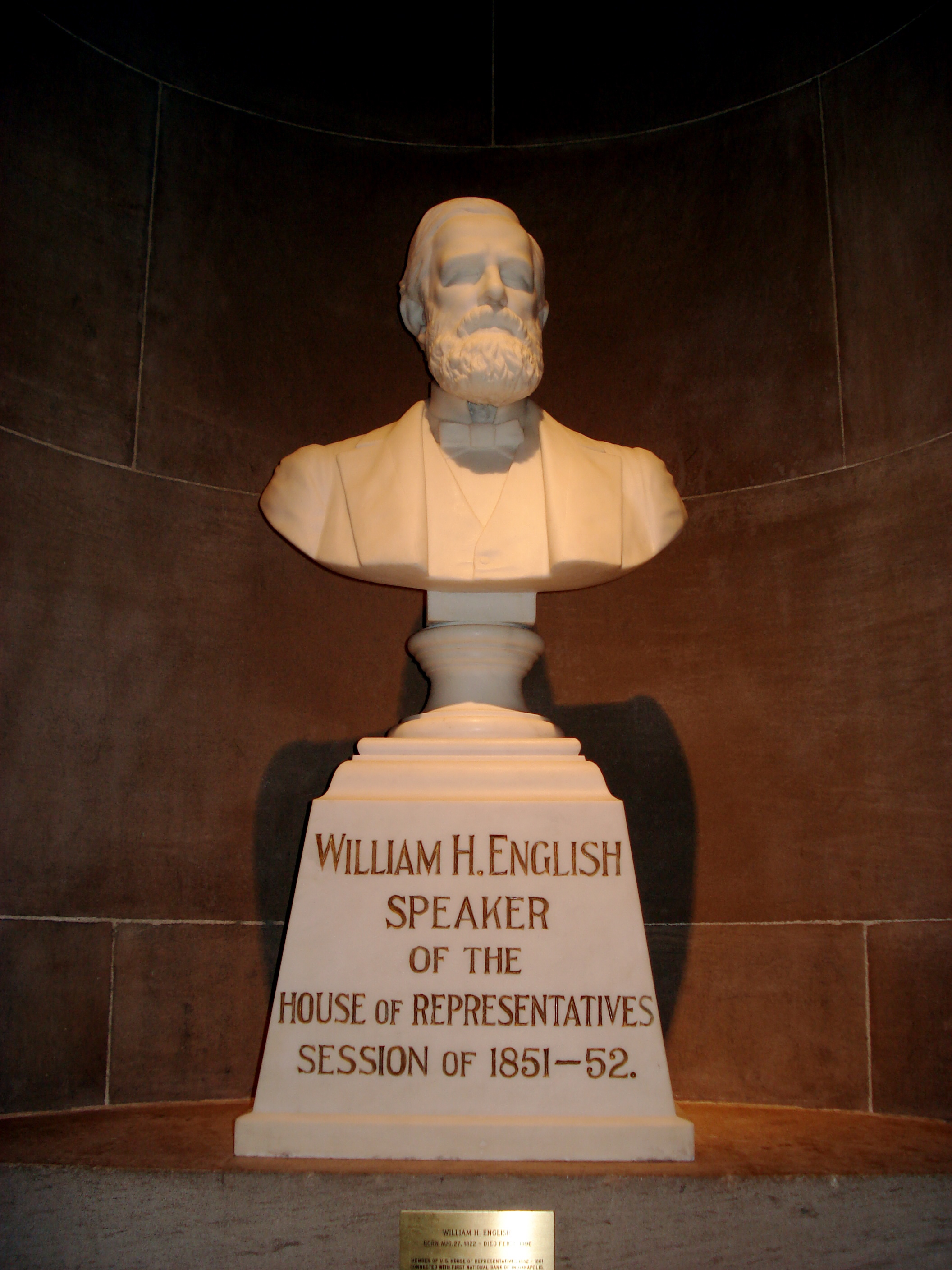
- Artist: Unknown
- Year: Unknown
- Type: Marble
- Dimensions: 55.88 cm × 60.96 cm × 38.1 cm (22.00 in × 24.00 in × 15.0 in)
- Location: Indiana Statehouse; Indianapolis, Indiana; 39°46′7.54″N 86°9′45.54″W

William H. English is a public artwork by an unknown artist, located in a niche on the third floor of the Indiana Statehouse, which is in Indianapolis, Indiana, United States of America.

== Description ==
This marble bust is dedicated to Indiana lawmaker William H. English. The carved inscription on the front of the pedestal reads as follows:

WILLIAM H. ENGLISH

SPEAKER
OF THE
HOUSE OF REPRESENTATIVES
SESSION OF 1851-52

The sculpture is sitting on top of a large pedestal. He is wearing a tuxedo with a bow tie, vest, jacket, and tuxedo shirt. English has a heavy brow, mustache, and beard. His hair is parted to the proper right. He is facing directly forward. The letters in the inscription on the pedestal are highlighted with gold. The bust rests in a niche with overall dimensions 22 x 24 x 15 in. (with pedestal).

== Historical information ==
William H. English was the Speaker of House, a political civil servant, native of Lexington, Indiana, and the first manager of English's Opera House, which was razed in 1948 to make way for a J.C. Penney's department store on Monument Circle.

He was a key figure in the development and building of the Soldiers' and Sailors' Monument, located at the center of Indianapolis' Monument Circle. He was a part of the board of commissioners for the erection of the monument. He was connected with the first National Bank of Indianapolis and a historian.

William H. English made significant contributions to the development of the city of Indianapolis; the state capitol of Indiana. His birth and death dates are 27 August 1822 – 7 February 1896. This bust may have been placed posthumously.

William H. English is located on the third floor of the Indiana statehouse, directly outside of the entrance to The General Assembly Hall of the Indiana House of Representatives.
