= Benjamin Parker =

Benjamin Parker may refer to:

- Uncle Ben, a Marvel Comics character
- Benjamin Parker (Illinois politician), 19th century Illinois state representative
