= Christopher Columbus (Vittori) =

Public artwork by Enrico Vittori

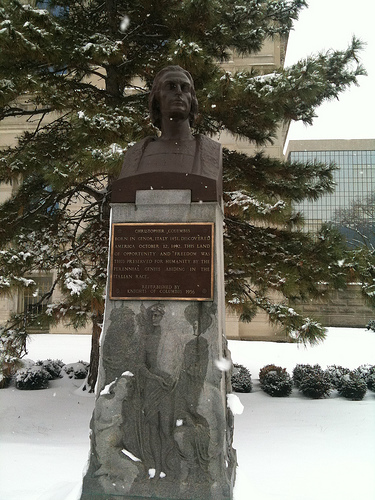
- Artist: Enrico Vittori
- Year: 1920, renovated 1955
- Type: Bronze bust on granite pedestal and granite base
- Dimensions: 344 cm × 200 cm × 190 cm (135.5 in × 80 in × 76 in)
- Location: Indiana Statehouse; Indianapolis; 39°46′4.85″N 86°9′47.45″W
- Owner: State of Indiana Department of Administration

Christopher Columbus is a public artwork by Italian artist Enrico Vittori and located on the grounds of the Indiana Statehouse in Indianapolis, Indiana. The sculpture was installed on the southwest corner of the Indiana Statehouse lawn in 1920 as a gift from Italian immigrant communities in Indiana.

== Artistic message ==
As indicated by the plaque, the artist was charged to illustrate the theme of "the perennial genius abiding in the Italian race." Vittori has depicted "the perennial genius of the Italian race" in the symbolic figure of a young white man in the center of the frieze. He is scantily dressed in a barely-there flowing garment, echoing traditional artistic representations of Roman gods. He is crowned with a wreath of laurel, symbolizing wisdom. Vittori drives home the message of his racial nobility by positioning three deferentially posed figures around him.

The most dramatic of these is a stylized representation of the Native American race. Vittori has dressed this Chief in stereotypical feathered headdress, and positioned him kneeling at the left foot of the white man, looking upward in awe of the perennial genius of the Italian race. Vittori has sculpted the chief with his lips reaching upward and pursed as if straining to kiss the hem of the noble man's garment.

Behind the figure representing "the perennial genius of the Italian race" stands a Black male slave. Since the statue's material does not allow for the depiction of skin color, Vittori indicated the Black race by depicting its figure with "wooly" hair. Vittoria poses the black race standing at the white man's right hand, symbolizing his eagerness to serve. The Black race deferentially avoids eye contact with "the perennial genius of the Italian Race."

At the right foot of the "perennial genius of the Italian race," also a position of subordination, kneels a figure representing white womanhood. Like the Black slave, she avoids eye contact with the "perennial genius of the Italian race." Instead, her gaze is directed squarely at his nearby loincloth.

== Description ==
The bust of explorer Christopher Columbus is cast in bronze. He wears a period costume, and his hair falls at approximately chin length. His facial expression is unsmiling, his chin is raised slightly and his eyes gaze off to his left. On the sculpture's proper left, below his left shoulder, the artist's name is inscribed as E. VITTORI. The bust of Columbus measures approximately 39 inches (99 cm) by 23 inches (58 cm) by 29 inches (74 cm); it stands on a granite pedestal measuring approximately 82 inches (210 cm) by 62 inches (160 cm) by 58 inches (150 cm) and a base that measures 14.5 inches (37 cm) by 80 inches (200 cm) by 76 inches (190 cm).

Below the bust is a granite pedestal with a plaque and relief carvings underneath. The carving on the front of the pedestal depicts a figure grouping with a man draped in fabric and wearing a crown of laurels standing in the center. His left arm is raised in the air and right hand rests in front of his waist. To the left and right of this man, three figures are featured, two of whom are kneeling before him. The relief on the pedestal's proper right side depicts a seated woman with her right hand resting on her chest and left hand on a large anchor; her head is turned to her right. The relief on the pedestal's proper left side is a profile view of a seated woman resting her right elbow on a globe. Below the relief sculptures, the pedestal slopes outward to meet a two-stepped granite base.

== Controversies ==
On the Centennial of the Statue's dedication, Indianapolis City-County Councilor Jason Larrison publicly called for the statue to be removed. Speaking from the Eiteljorg Museum of American Indians and Western Art, Larrison objected to the public celebration of a historical figure infamous for his role in the genocide of the Native American peoples, and the pain this must cause to their descendants alive today.

== Historical context ==
The Knights of Columbus was established in the late 19th century as a Catholic fraternal order. At the time, sentiment against Italian immigration was high in America. It still identifies as an organization of Catholic men, although it is not exclusive to Italian Americans. Leading up to 1920, celebrated at the 500th anniversary of Columbus' arrival in the Americas, the Knights of Columbus celebrated Italian racial pride by encouraging local groups to take up collections to erect statues of Christopher Columbus.

== Historical information ==
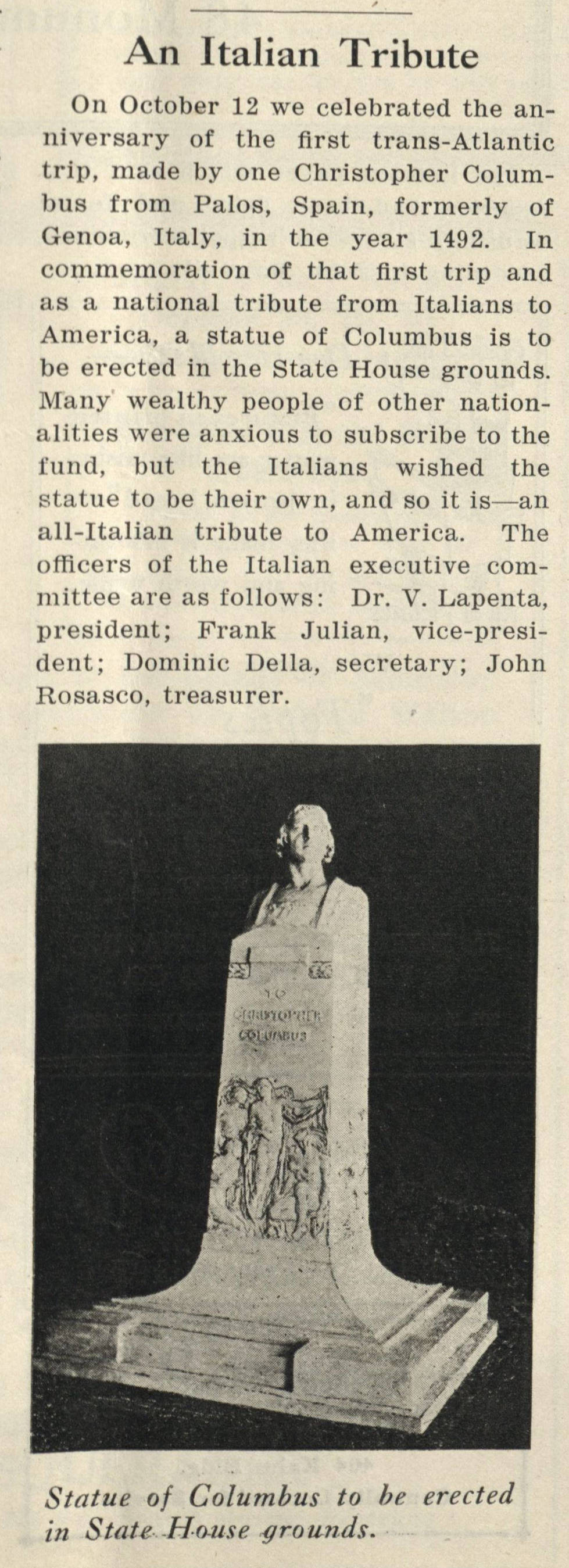
A newspaper article from October 1920 depicts the soon-to-be-installed statue.

Christopher Columbus was created by Enrico (Harry) Vittori, an Italian artist who lived in Indianapolis. Vittori attended the Florence Academy of Art in Florence, Italy, and traveled to Indianapolis in 1919 to work for an airplane company. The sculpture was presented to the state of Indiana in 1920 by members of Indiana's Italian community. It is the only monument at the Indiana Statehouse donated by immigrants, and it was intended by the Italians to be a tribute to America. The monument stood unchanged for 35 years. In 1955 the Knights of Columbus funded the cleaning of the bronze bust and the addition of new bronze lettering on the back of the pedestal. The sculpture was modified again in 1992 during the Columbus Quincentenary, which celebrated the 500th anniversary of Columbus's voyage to America. The Knights of Columbus installed a plaque bearing another statement about Christopher Columbus. This one contains the line, "May the genius abiding in the Italian Race encourage tolerance and acceptance of all cultures as America's ultimate contribution to humanity."

== Plaques and text ==
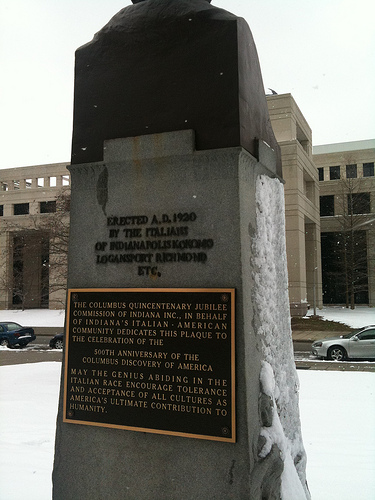
Back of pedestal

Metal lettering on the pedestal's back reads:

ERECTED A.D. 1920
BY THE ITALIANS
OF INDIANAPOLIS KOKOMO
LOGANSPORT RICHMOND
ETC.

A plaque on the pedestal's front, added in 1956, states:

CHRISTOPHER COLUMBUS
BORN IN GENOA, ITALY 1451. DISCOVERED
AMERICA OCTOBER 12, 1492. THIS LAND
OF OPPORTUNITY AND FREEDOM WAS
THUS PRESERVED FOR HUMANITY BY THE
PERENNIAL GENIUS ABIDING IN THE
ITALIAN RACE.
REFURBISHED BY KNIGHTS OF COLUMBUS 1956.

A plaque on the pedestal's back, added in 1992 reads:

THE COLUMBUS QUINCENTENARY JUBILEE
COMMISSION OF INDIANA INC., IN BEHALF
OF INDIANA'S ITALIAN-AMERICAN
COMMUNITY DEDICATES THIS PLAQUE TO
THE CELEBRATION OF THE 500TH ANNIVERSARY OF THE
COLUMBUS DISCOVERY OF AMERICA
MAY THE GENIUS ABIDING IN THE ITALIAN RACE ENCOURAGE TOLERANCE
AND ACCEPTANCE OF ALL CULTURES AS
AMERICA'S ULTIMATE CONTRIBUTION TO HUMANITY.

=== Acquisition ===
Christopher Columbus was a gift from a group of Italian immigrants who lived in Indiana. It was commissioned with proceeds from a fundraising campaign led by Vincent A. LaPenta, a surgeon and scientist who presided over the executive committee of Italian Propaganda. Indiana Governor James P. Goodrich dedicated the sculpture on October 31, 1920. LaPenta spoke at the dedication ceremony and stated, "Columbus can be considered humanity's greatest benefactor."

The sculpture is owned by the State of Indiana, Department of Administration.

=== Location history ===
Christopher Columbus was installed on the Indiana Statehouse lawn shortly after its completion and has not been moved or viewed in any other location. However, the initial proposal for the sculpture requested that the piece be erected in one of the Indianapolis parks, and the location of "University Square" was listed as a potential site for the monument.

== Condition ==
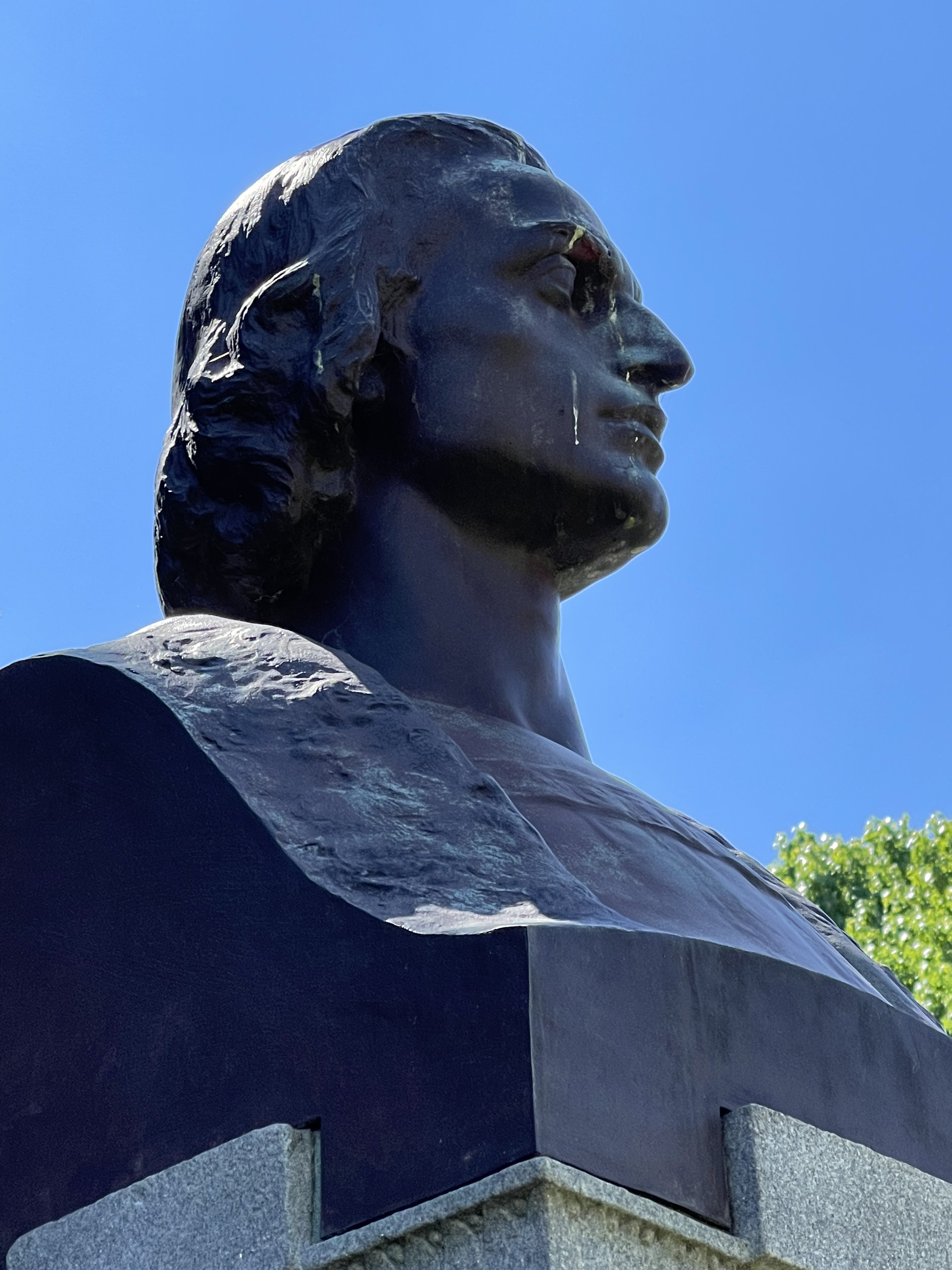
Bird feces on the bust in June 2022.

Christopher Columbus was cleaned in 1992. Surveyed in 1994 as part of the Save Outdoor Sculpture! project with an overall condition rated as "good", it was determined that the sculpture would benefit from conservation treatment. In particular, the piece suffered from metallic staining, erosion, green caulking on the pedestal, and bird guano.

== See also ==
- Thomas A. Hendricks Monument
- List of public art at the Indiana Statehouse
