= Bust of Benjamin Harrison =

Bust by Richard Peglow

Benjamin Harrison bust
- Artist: Richard Peglow
- Year: 2008
- Type: Bronze, Marble
- Dimensions: 71 cm × 64 cm (28 in × 25 in)
- Location: Indianapolis

Benjamin Harrison is a bust by American artist Richard Peglow, located in the north atrium on the second floor of the Indiana Statehouse in Indianapolis, Indiana, United States. The bust is cast in bronze and depicts President Benjamin Harrison. The bust is placed in front of a grey and black marble shield with six stars tracing around the edge of the shape. The bust and shield are approximately 28 inches (710 mm) wide by 25 inches (640 mm) high and has a depth of 14.5 inches (370 mm). The artwork was cast and placed in the statehouse in 2008 in accordance with Indiana code Section 2. IC 4-20.5-6-12.

== Description ==
The artwork consists of three pieces: a bronze bust, a black granite shield and a limestone base. The bust is 21 inches (530 mm) tall by 17 inches (430 mm) wide (shoulder to shoulder) and has a depth of 12 inches (300 mm). The entire sculpture has a height of 28 inches (710 mm) with a width of 25 inches (640 mm) and a depth of 14.5 inches (370 mm). The bust depicts the 23rd president of the United States, Benjamin Harrison. He is wearing his favorite overcoat and has a full beard. The only word present on the bust, Harrison, is on a bronze banner across the top of the granite shield. The shield is black Indian granite, the black polished edges showcasing the sandblasted gray interior. The six stars along the right and left flanks represent the six states (North Dakota, South Dakota, Montana, Washington, Idaho, Wyoming) that entered the Union while Harrison was in office, more states than any other president. The shield design was inspired by Harrison's 1888 campaign slogan "Protection and Reciprocity" and also recalls the shape of the Indiana state tree, the tulip tree . The sculpture was made in the artist's studio in Kirklin, Indiana, and cast in bronze at the SinCerus Bronze Art Center in Indianapolis.

== Historical information ==
The bust was commissioned by the Indiana General Assembly in 2007 in House Bill 1818, which also commissions artwork based on the contributions of African Americans to be placed in the statehouse. The bill "requires the department to commission a bust of President Benjamin Harrison for display in the state capitol. Requires the department to consult with the historical bureau and the arts commission on the design of the bust. Requires the approval of the legislative council before the bust is placed in the state capitol." The sponsors of the bill were Representatives V. Smith, M. Murphy, C. Brown; and Senators J. Merritt, E. Rogers, S. Smith, B. Breaux, and G. Howard.

The artist, Richard Peglow, is an Indiana native, having been born and raised in La Port, Indiana. He has studied at the Art Institute of Ft. Lauderdale, Herron School of Art, University of Notre Dame, and Northern Illinois University.

The bust was placed in the Indiana statehouse on November 18, 2008, and the great-great-grandson of Benjamin Harrison, Kimball Morsman, was in attendance. Indiana Governor Mitch Daniels gave a speech in which he expressed surprise that a bust of Benjamin Harrison has not been placed in the statehouse before. A more critical voice has raised the question as to why the Indiana General Assembly had to be involved in such a project at all. Matthew Tully of the Indianapolis Star mentioned the bust while examining other, "laws that will in no way reshape the way we all go about our daily lives". Tully had no problem with Benjamin Harrison or with putting a bust of the former president in the statehouse. Rather, he asked "Do we really need a law for this?"
