= Bust of George Rogers Clark =

Sculpture by David McLary

George Rogers Clark
- Artist: David Mclary
- Year: 1985
- Type: Plaster, political sculpture
- Dimensions: 81.28 cm × 50.8 cm × 38.1 cm (32 in × 20 in × 15 in)
- Location: Indiana Statehouse; Indianapolis; 38°46′7.54″N 86°9′45.54″W
- Owner: Indiana Statehouse

George Rogers Clark is a plaster bust made by American artist David McLary. Dated 1985, the sculpture depicts American Revolutionary War hero and frontiersman George Rogers Clark. The bust is located in an alcove on the third floor of the Indiana Statehouse in Indianapolis, United States. The bust measures 32 inches (81 cm) by 20 inches (51 cm) by 15 inches (38 cm) and sets upon a wooden base measuring approximately 6 inches (15 cm) by 19 inches (48 cm) by 24.25 inches (61.6 cm).

== Description ==
In a frontier-style fringe shirt with lace-up collar, George Rogers Clark looks off to his right. He wears a cowboy hat with the proper left of its brim rolled up. The surface of the bust is rough with a seemingly unrefined style.

On the posterior of the proper right shoulder is the artists' engraving which says:
DAVID MCLARY / 1985 / INDIANA STATE MUSEUM

The brass plaque on the wooden base reads:
GEORGE ROGERS CLARK / 1752–1818 / INDIANA STATEHOUSE COLLECTION

== Historical background ==
This bust was sculpted by David McLary in 1985, an Indianapolis-based artist and employee of the Indiana State Museum. Using a casting process a mold was made of the sculpture and from this mold a preliminary cast was made. After the cast went through a refining process a second mold was made from the preliminary cast. It is from this second cast that six other busts were cast and finished in a variety of fashions. There were eight total casts. Other than the sculpture in the Indiana Statehouse, only two of the casts' whereabouts are known. One bust was presented to the George Rogers Clark Elementary School in Clarksville, Indiana. Upon the request of former Councilman John Minta, one bust was then presented to the Clarksville Town Hall.
