= Spirit of Indiana =

Public artwork by Eugene Savage

- Artist: Eugene Francis Savage
- Year: 1964
- Dimensions: 6.4 m × 12.6 m (21 ft × 41.5 ft)
- Location: Indianapolis State House; Indianapolis
- Owner: Indiana state government

Spirit of Indiana is a public artwork by American artist Eugene Francis Savage, located in the Indiana State House, which is in Indianapolis, Indiana, United States. The mural is 21 feet (6.4 m) tall by 41.5 feet (12.6 m) wide and is oil on linen canvas. It was commissioned in 1961 and installation was finished in 1964.

== Description ==
The mural is on the east wall of the Indiana House of Representatives in the Indiana State House. On the far left side, Education holds a torch and offers a cornucopia of "cherished things" as a burnt sacrifice as Pegasus and Apollo rise from the smoke. To their right, Indiana is depicted as a woman in an empire gown of 1816 entering into her statehood, escorted by William Henry Harrison. The pair stands in front of a sycamore tree. The right side of the mural depicts the Roman goddess Ceres presiding over the work of Indiana's agriculture and industry as their products are loaded on ships and transported around the world. In the background, behind the sycamore, cloud formations represent the pioneer, settlement, and Civil War periods of Indiana's history.

== Historical information ==
The mural was initially commissioned on May 31, 1961. It was originally titled "The Apotheosis of Indiana (1860-1960)". The preliminary designs were approved by a representative of then-Governor Matthew E. Welsh and final approval of the work was made by a gubernatorial representative and the Abbey Fund Committee. It was completed in Savage's studio and moved to the State House to be installed.

The work cost $40,000 and was paid for entirely by an Abbey Fund grant.
