= Indiana Statehouse =

State capitol building of the US state of Indiana

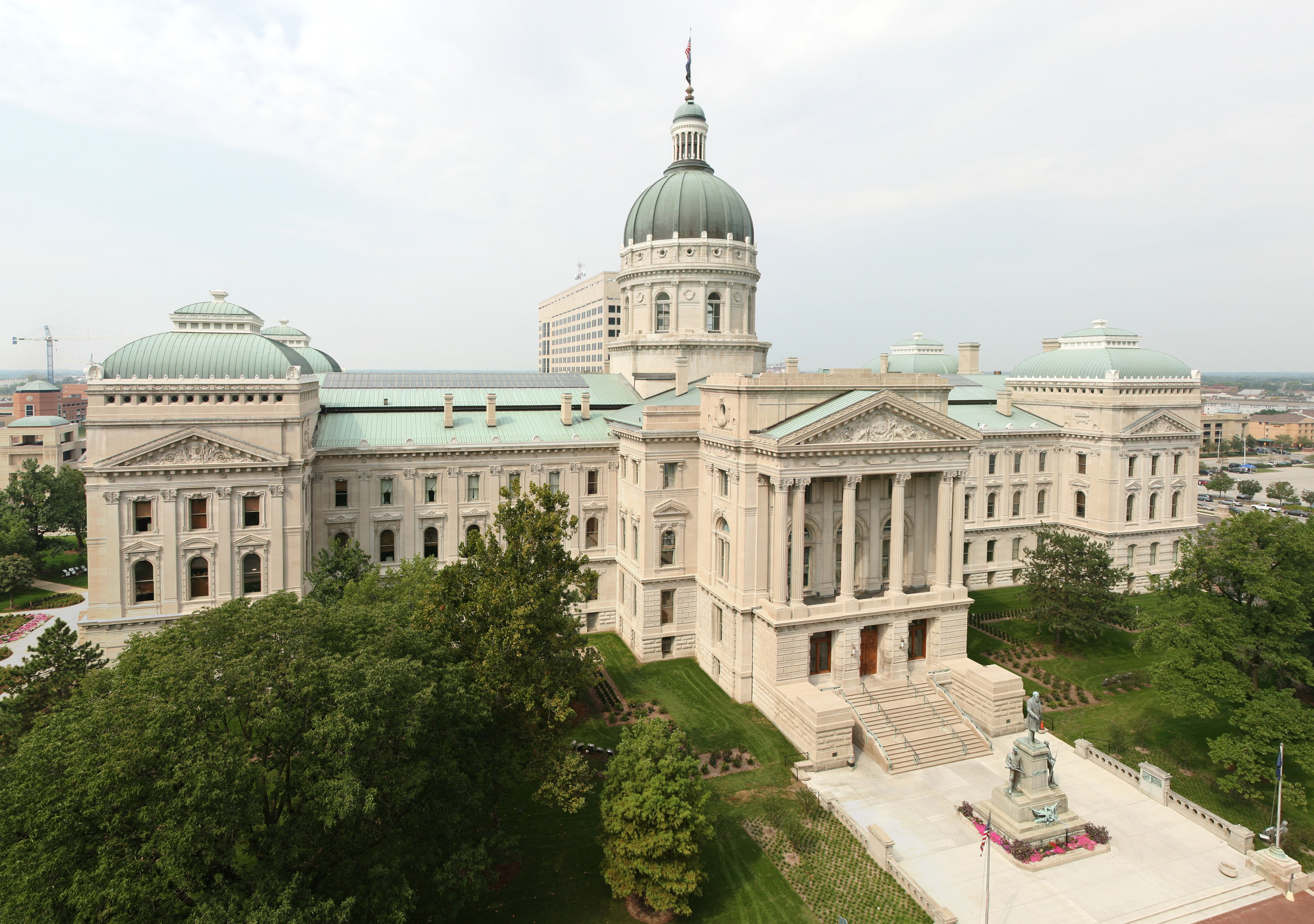

- Location within Indianapolis Location within Indianapolis Location within Indiana Location within the United States

General information
- Location: 200 W. Washington St., Indianapolis, Indiana 46204
- Coordinates: 39°46′07″N 86°09′46″W
- Construction started: September 28, 1880; 145 years ago
- Completed: October 1888; 137 years ago

Design and construction
- Architects: Edwin May, Adolf Scherrer
- Indiana Statehouse
- U.S. National Register of Historic Places
- Architectural style: Renaissance Revival
- NRHP reference No.: 75000043
- Added to NRHP: August 28, 1975

The Indiana Statehouse is the state capitol building of the U.S. state of Indiana. It houses the Indiana General Assembly, the office of the Governor of Indiana, the Indiana Supreme Court, and other state officials. The Statehouse is located in the capital city of Indianapolis at 200 West Washington Street. Built in 1888, it is the fourth building to house the state government.

The first statehouse, located in Corydon, Indiana, is still standing and is maintained as a state historic site. The second building was the old Marion County courthouse which was demolished and replaced in the early 20th century. The third building was a structure modeled on the Parthenon, but was condemned in 1877 because of structural defects and razed so the current statehouse could be built on its location.

== History ==
=== First Statehouse (1816–1824) ===
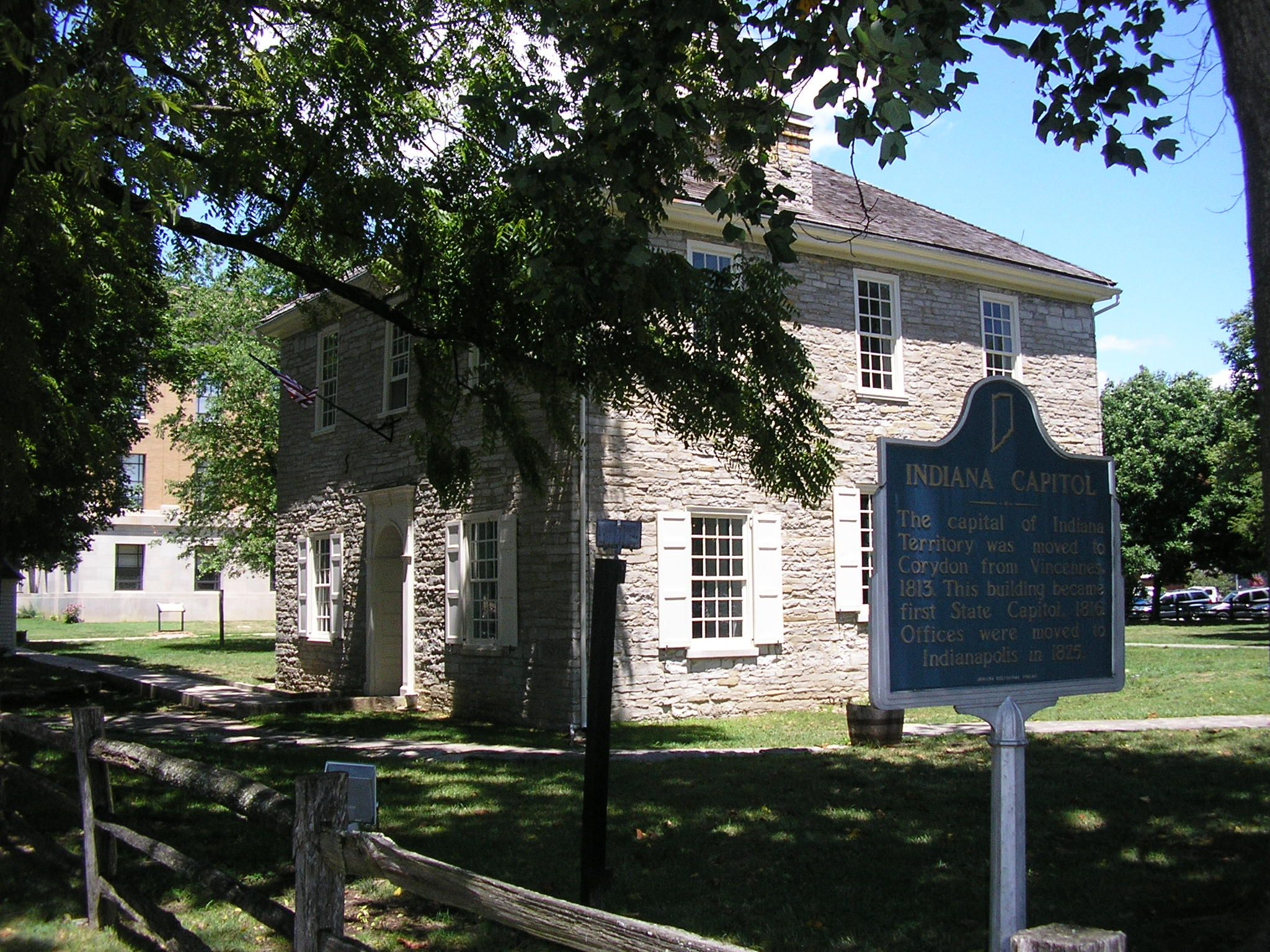
The first capitol building in downtown Corydon

When Indiana became a state in 1816, the capital was located in Corydon. The first capitol building was a humble, two-story limestone building constructed in 1813 to house the legislature of the Indiana Territory. The building was constructed by a company owned by Dennis Pennington, a member of the early territorial legislature. Construction cost $1,500 paid for by the citizens of Harrison County, and was completed in three years. It measured forty-feet square with walls two-feet-thick and ten-foot ceilings. The building was made of limestone cut from a nearby quarry and, at the time of its completion, was one of the largest buildings in the state.

The capitol contained three rooms and quickly became too small for the state government, which had to erect additional office buildings across the street for the state's administration. The lower floor of the statehouse was used by the Indiana House of Representatives. The upper floor was split into two rooms, one for the Indiana State Senate and another for the Indiana Supreme Court, with a narrow hall between them. Upon the relocation of the state government to Indianapolis in 1824, the building was given to Harrison County to use as a courthouse. The old capitol building is still preserved and is now a state historic site.

=== Marion County Courthouse (1825–1835) ===
When the state government relocated to Indianapolis in December 1824, the government was housed in the Marion County Courthouse. The courthouse had been constructed with state funds in 1822 after Indianapolis was chosen as the site for the new capitol. The courthouse served as the state capitol building for ten years. At the time Indianapolis was a frontier site, nearly 60 miles (97 km) from the nearest settlement of significance, making large scale construction impractical.

The relocation to Indianapolis was an arduous task. At the time it was an eleven-day journey by horseback from Corydon to the new capital. To complicate matters, no road existed and a path for the wagons had to be cut through the dense forests during the winter transit as the long caravan moved north. The caravan was large because it contained the state treasury, state library, state records, the furniture of the General Assembly, Supreme Court, and Executive Offices, along with a whole host of other implements to aid the caravan on its long journey. Colonel Samuel Merrill, the state treasurer, was authorized by the General Assembly to oversee the move. Ultimately, it took more than a month to relocate the government to Indianapolis. The first session of the General Assembly convened there in January 1825.

=== Second Statehouse (1835–1877) ===
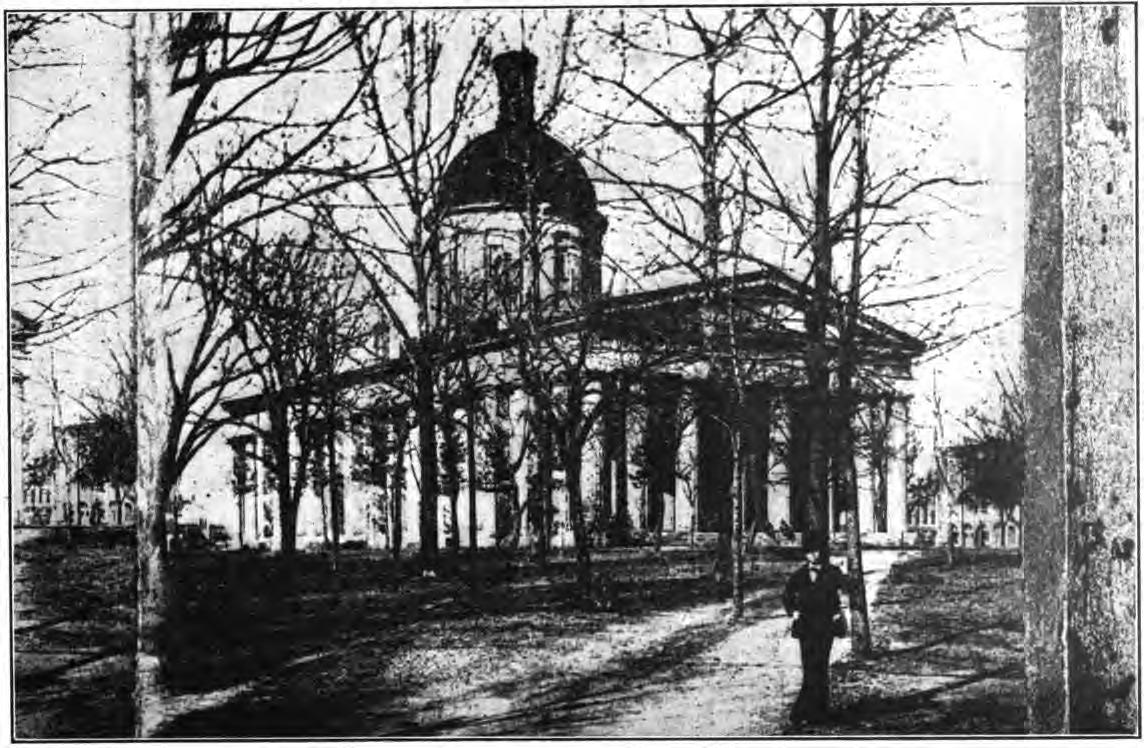
Indiana's second statehouse had a design inspired by the Parthenon

On February 10, 1831, the Indiana General Assembly approved construction of a new statehouse. The building was to be funded by the sale of lots of land in Indianapolis. A commission was established and Commissioner James Blake offered a $150 prize to the architect who could design the best state house. Twenty-one proposals were received, some from local firms and others from as far as the east coast (New York and Philadelphia) and the south (Nashville, Tennessee). The design from the firm of Ithiel Town and Alexander Jackson Davis was selected by the commission and then approved by the General Assembly on January 26, 1832. Their plans were for a structure inspired by the ancient Greek Parthenon. The building looked very much like the Parthenon except for a large central dome. Town and Davis was awarded a $58,000 contract to construct the building. The legislature had anticipated paying for the building by the sale of the remaining lots of the donation grant of land that the Federal government had given the state for a capital city, but only $13,000 was received in the sale in May 1832, with the remaining unsold lots having an estimated value of only $3,650, meaning that other sources of funds were required. On the recommendation of Ithiel Town, the square block directly north of the statehouse was withheld from the sale for future use by the state, which was proved fortuitous when the current statehouse was constructed on both squares. The contract set a 1838 deadline for completion, but construction was completed ahead of schedule, being mostly done by December 1835. The building was centered in the square defined by Washington Street on the south, Mississippi Street (now Senate Avenue) on the west, Market Street on the north, and Tennessee Street (now Capitol Avenue) on the east. It was oriented north–south, with entrances on the north and south. The east and west sides were 180 feet (55 m) long while the north and south sides were 80 feet (24 m).

The statehouse was built of blue limestone, two stories high. The governor and the Supreme Court occupied the lower floor, and the legislature occupied the upper floor, with each house in its own wing. During its first session in the new building, the legislature passed the Internal Improvement Act of 1836 (often known as the Mammoth Improvement Act) that funded several projects, including turnpikes, canals, and later, railroads. The building was the site of many great events in its history, including a bier for Abraham Lincoln.

The statehouse was popular immediately after its construction, but by the 1860s Greek Revival architecture had fallen out of style and the building was beginning to become decrepit. The building's limestone (and perhaps, slate) foundation began to fail, and many feared a general structural collapse of the building. In 1867, the ceiling in the chambers of the Indiana House of Representatives collapsed. In addition, the growth of the state government meant that the statehouse was too small. An article in the Indianapolis News on January 30, 1877, summed up the problems, noting that it "is too small if it were good, and it is too bad if it were big enough". A debate was held in 1873 about how to preserve the building but no solution was found. By the time that James D. Williams was elected governor in November 1876, the building was about to be condemned. Demolition of the building began on December 11, 1877, and was completed on March 12, 1878, with the razing of the last portion of the structure still standing, the dome.

=== Temporary facilities (1877–1888) ===
When the third statehouse was condemned in 1876, the government abandoned the building. The General Assembly relocated to a large office building that had been built in 1865 and was already housing the Supreme Court. The governor and the executive staff relocated to another office building. The office building was used as the state house during the interim period that the new state house was being built. In 1887, before the new state house had been completed, enough of the lower floors were usable for the government to move out of the cramped office space and begin holding sessions in the new structure.

== Current Statehouse ==
=== Construction ===
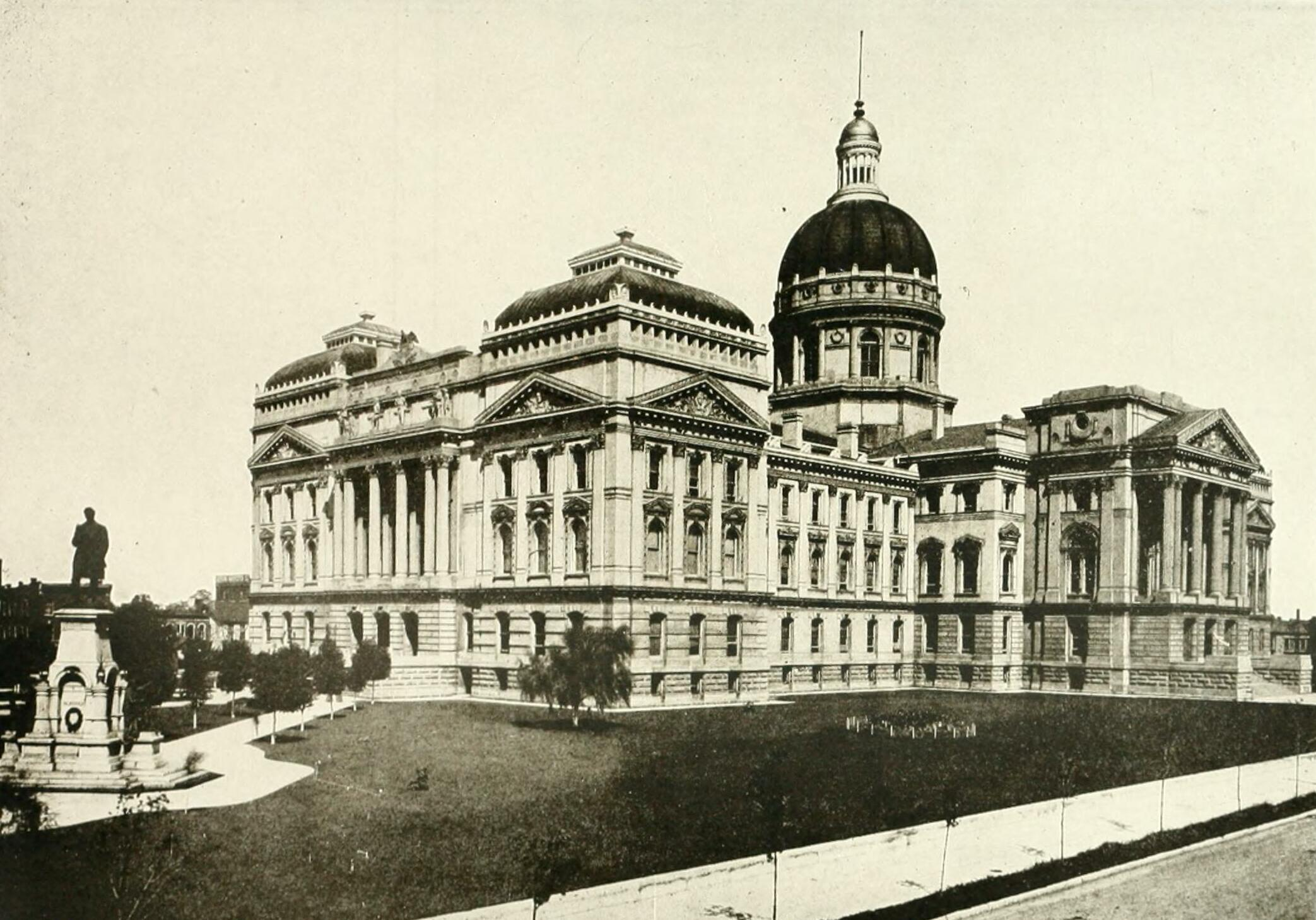
The statehouse as it appeared in 1908.

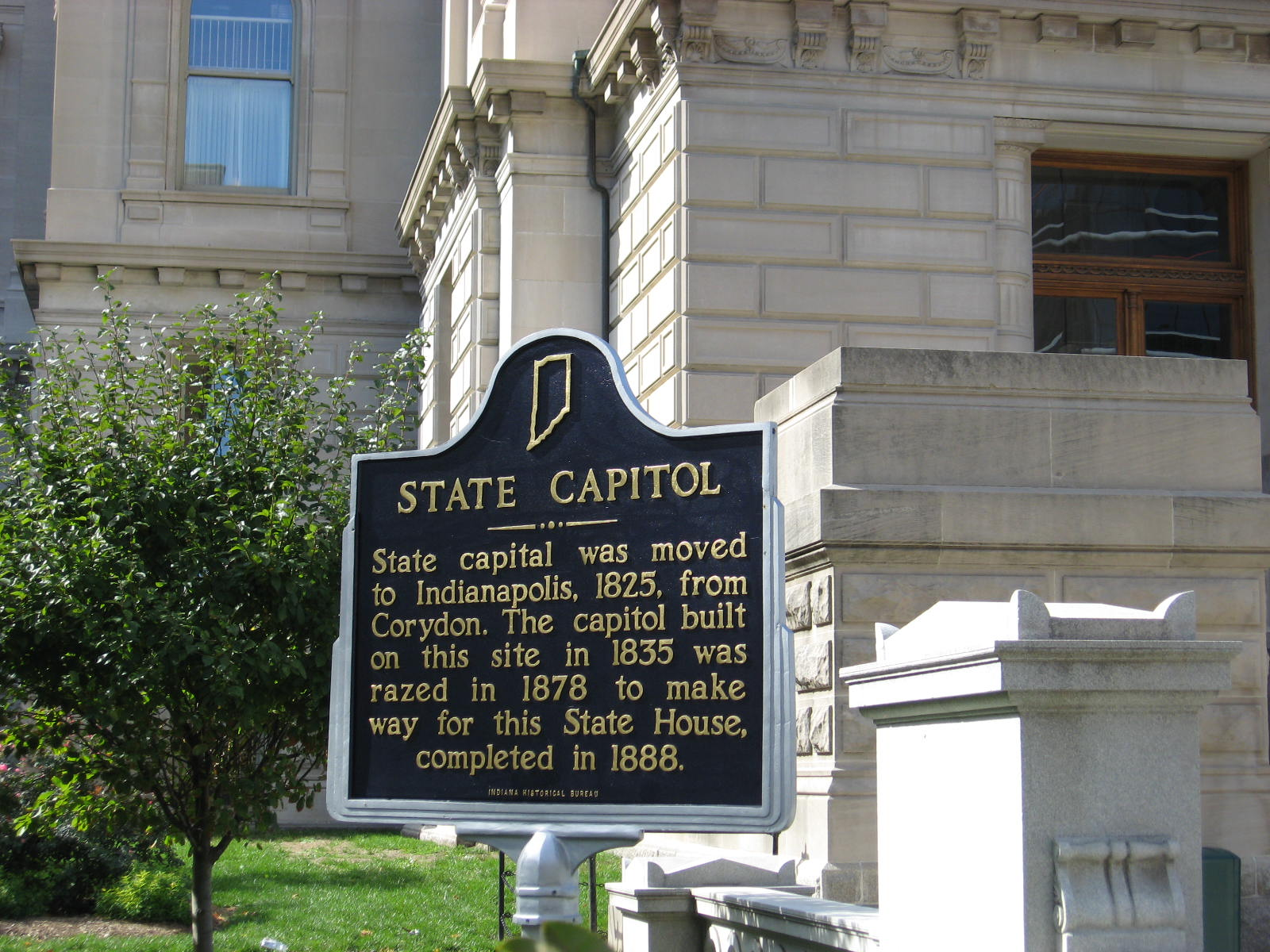
Indiana Historical Marker at the current statehouse.

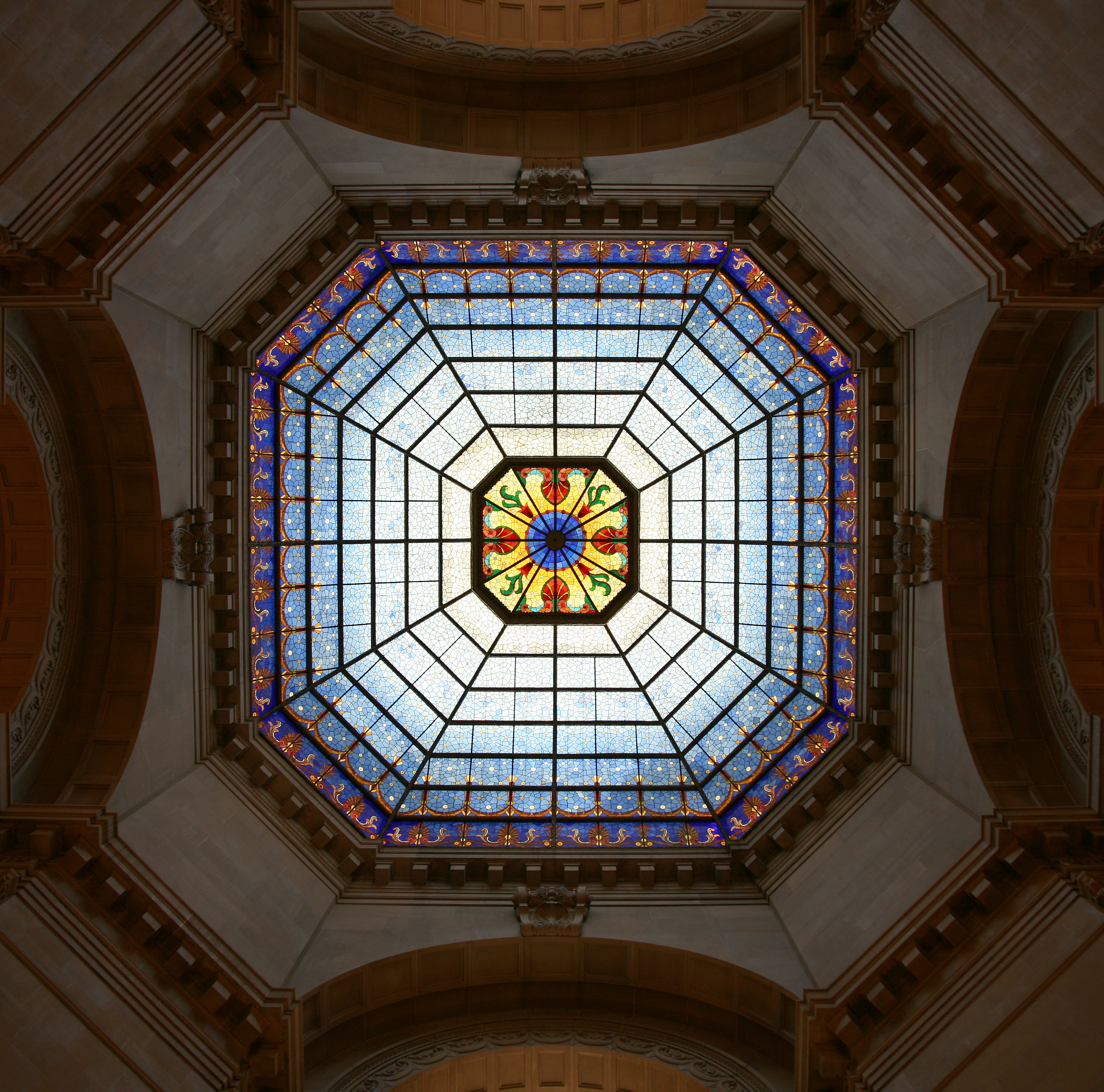
Interior of the statehouse's rotunda.

With Indiana's rapid increase of population during the middle of the 19th century, the state's government increased in size, causing the previous capitol building to become crowded. In 1865, a state office building had to be constructed to house some of the burgeoning government, and the Supreme Court and several bureaus were relocated into the new building. When the statehouse was condemned in 1877, the state was without a real capitol building, and the administration of Governor James D. Williams proposed the construction of the current state capitol building. The plan was approved by the Indiana General Assembly during the legislative session of 1878. After the second state capitol building had been razed, the new building was constructed on the same site. Two million dollars (USD) were appropriated for construction of the new building, and it was completed in 1888. Governor Williams, who was famed for his frugality, was able to complete the project for $1.8 million and returned the extra $200,000 to the general fund.

A team of commissioners, including former Civil War general and civil engineer Thomas A. Morris, planned and oversaw the project. The structure was designed by Edwin May, an Indianapolis architect. Not wanting to repeat the mistakes made in the construction of the previous statehouse, the legislature required the new capitol to be built on a solid foundation so that it would last for many decades. Construction began in 1880 and the cornerstone was laid on September 28. Edwin May died in February of that year, and Adolph Scherer supervised the project for the entire construction period. The interior was modeled in the Italian Renaissance style. Wherever possible, materials native to Indiana were used. Doors were made of Indiana oak, and Indiana limestone was used throughout the structure. The building's cornerstone is a ten-ton block of limestone quarried in Spencer, Indiana. The central dome was completed in 1883. The building was also wired for electricity, even though Indianapolis did not yet have an electrical power grid. In 1887, the new capitol was sufficiently finished for the first legislative session to be held there. Construction ultimately endured eight years, and the building was finally completed in October 1888. With the pinnacle of the building reaching 256 feet (78 m) high, it was the second-tallest building in the state at the time of its completion.

A hole was bored in the cornerstone, and a time capsule was placed inside containing forty-two items. The items included annual reports from all the government agencies, a Bible, samples of several varieties of crops grown in Indiana, several new coins, local maps and newspapers, a book on the history of Indianapolis, and pamphlets from many of the city's institutions.

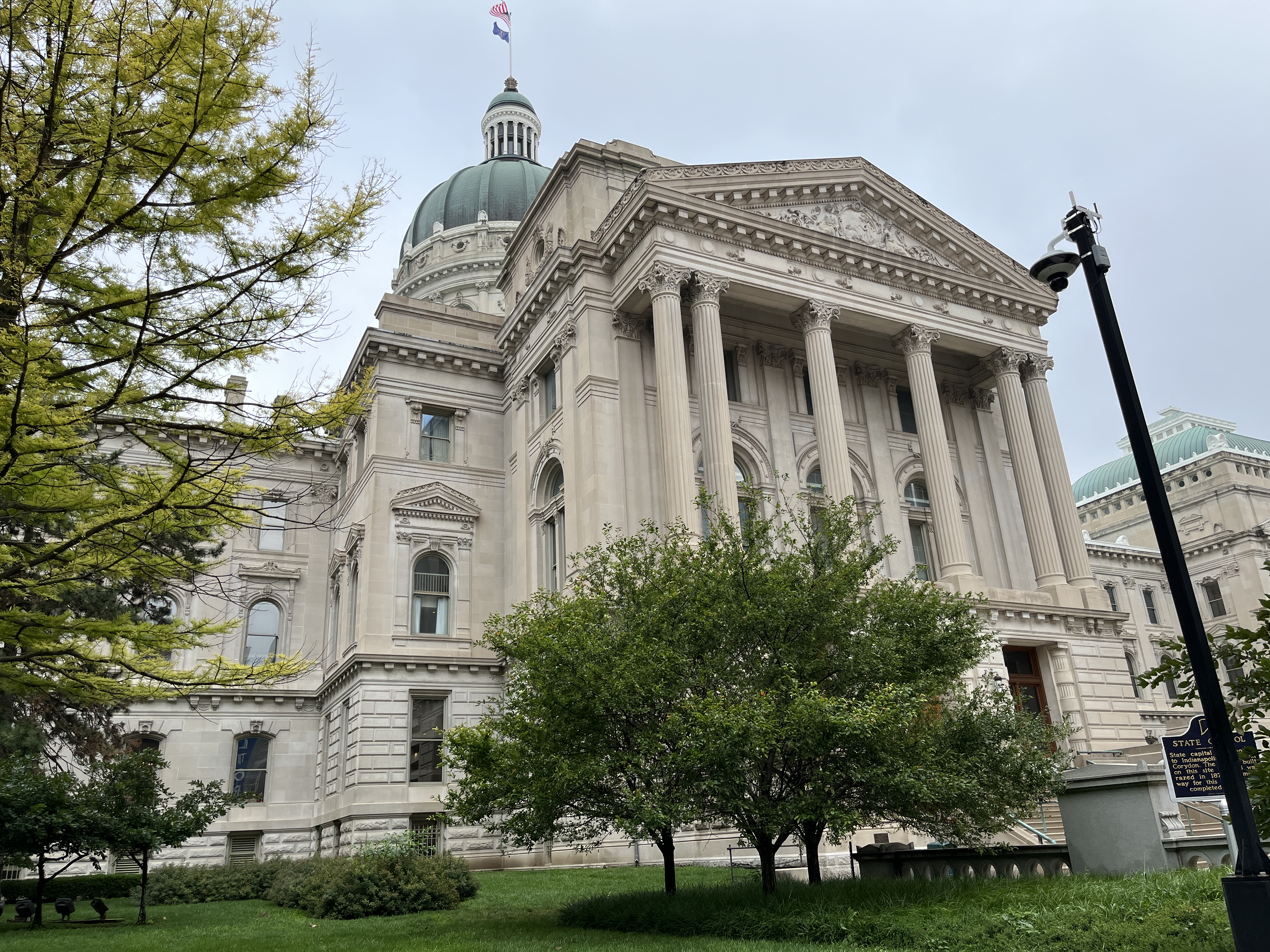
Indiana State Capitol

The building is designed in the shape of a cross. A large central rotunda with a glass domed ceiling connects the four wings. The structure is four stories high. The first floor houses committee rooms for the House of Representatives and the Senate. The second floor houses the executive offices of the administration. On the third floor, offices for the Indiana House of Representatives are on the east side, while those for the Indiana State Senate are on the west side. Offices of the Indiana Supreme Court are on the north end of the third floor. The seventy-thousand volume Supreme Court Law Library is located on third floor. The third floor also holds the House, Senate, and Supreme Court chambers, and the fourth floor holds the Indiana Court of Appeals courtroom and the offices of nine of the fifteen judges on the Court. The building was constructed for the purpose of holding the entire government of the state. Indiana is one of a few states that still have all three branches of government operating in the same historic building. For several decades, all the government bureaus were housed within the building, until the government again outgrew the structure; most of the state's bureaus have gradually been moved out of the building. In front of the State House stands a statue of Oliver Morton, governor of Indiana during the Civil War.

=== Renovation ===
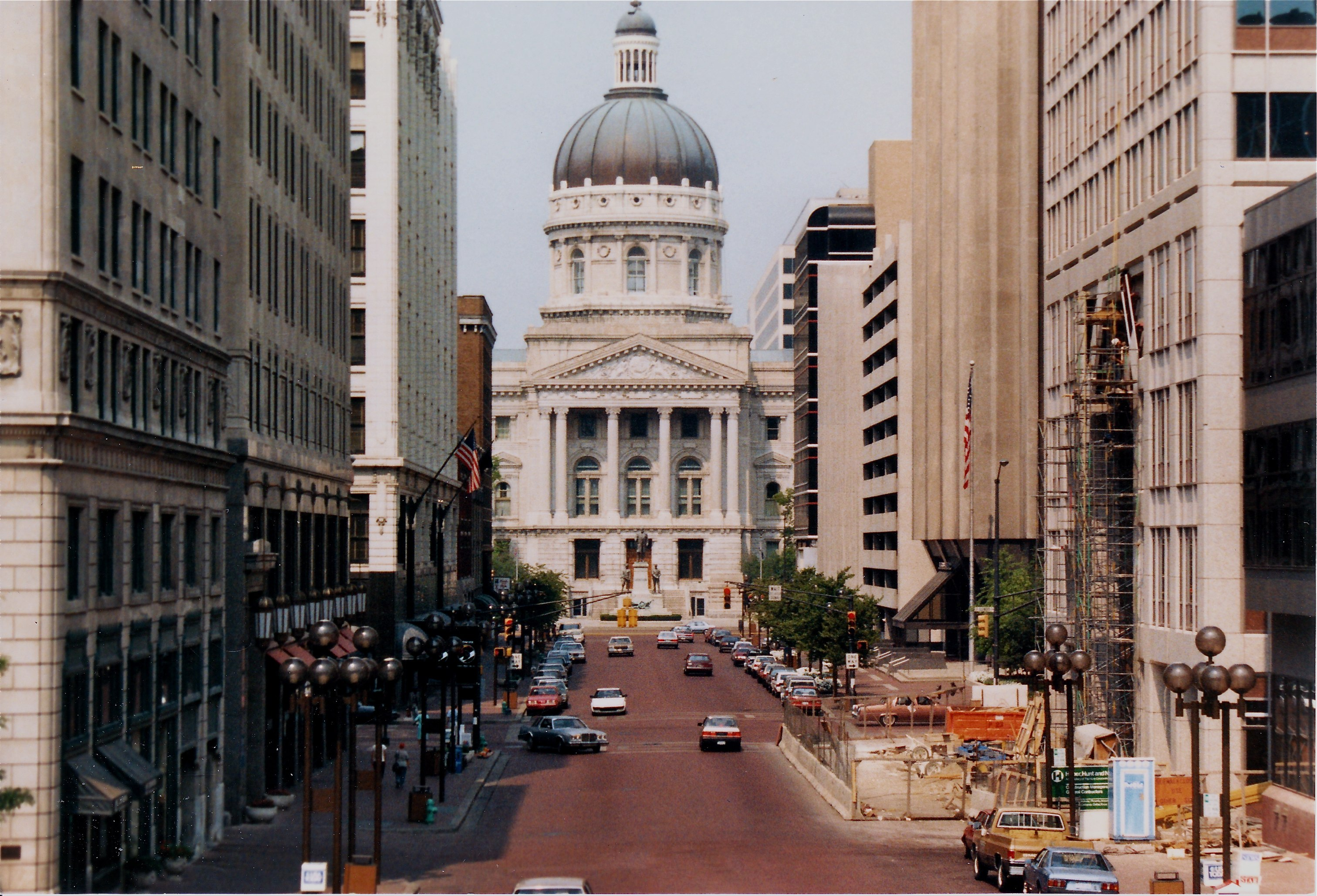
The statehouse, as viewed from the Soldiers' and Sailors' Monument in 1988, the year a multi-million dollar renovation began.

In 1988, the administration of Governor Robert D. Orr proposed that the Indiana General Assembly renovate the statehouse as part of "Hoosier Celebration '88", the year of the building's 100th anniversary. The General Assembly approved, and the building had an extensive, $11 million renovation that continued until 1995.

During the renovation process, all of the statehouse's stonework, consisting of marble, granite, and limestone columns and blocks, was cleaned and polished. All of the building's woodwork was repaired or replaced. Broken glass in the central dome skylight was replaced. The building's lighting was updated with new chandeliers based on the original designs, and most interior walls were repainted. The building was wired for a new data network to make the building ready for 21st-century technology.

In 1984, the Indiana Statehouse was added to the National Register of Historic Places, and it remains a protected building. The state house is open for public tours during the work week and with limited tours during weekend mornings.

=== Public artworks ===
Located inside and around the Statehouse property are more than 40 works of public art that depict many important individuals and events related to the state of Indiana. The collection spans more than 130 years of artistic activity in a variety of mediums.

== See also ==
- List of state and territorial capitols in the United States
- List of public art at the Indiana Statehouse
- Government of Indiana
- List of Indiana General Assemblies
- List of tallest buildings in Indianapolis
- List of tallest domes
- Indiana First State Capitol State Historic Site
- National Register of Historic Places listings in Center Township, Marion County, Indiana
