= List of public art in Indiana =

This is a list of public art in Indiana organized by County and City.

This list applies only to works of public art accessible in an outdoor public space. For example, this does not include artwork visible inside a museum.

Most of the works mentioned are sculptures. When this is not the case (i.e. sound installation, for example) it is stated next to the title.

== Adams ==
=== Decatur ===
Title	Artist	Year	Location/GPS Coordinates	Material	Dimensions	Owner	Image
Apparition Indecision	Charles Yost		DZ Gaming			Charles Yost	
Best Friends	Greg Mendez		Adams Public Library System	Bronze		Adams Public Library System	
The Blessed Mother	Greg Mendez and Neil Wiffill	2013	St. Mary of the Assumption	Steel and scagliola		Roman Catholic Diocese of Fort Wayne-South Bend	
Caduceus	Greg Mendez	2011	Adams Memorial Hospital	Bronze		Adams Memorial Hospital	
Crucifixion	Unknown	ca. 1935	St. Joseph Cemetery	Metal	Sculpture: approx. 15 x 8 x 2 1/2 ft.	St. Joseph Cemetery	
Cross	Greg Mendez		Decatur Presbyterian Church 40°49′38.5″N 84°55′23.42″W	Bronze		Decatur Presbyterian Church	
Flag with Pole Protector	Charles Yost		Riverside Sculpture Park			City of Decatur	
For Which it Stands	James Haire		Founder's Park	Bronze		City of Decatur	
It Must Be a Good Book	Greg Mendez	2011	Adams Public Library	Bronze		Adams Public Library	
Morgan Monument	Tom Ellinger	1989	Decatur Cemetery	Granite	Sculpture: approx. 1 ft. 9 in. x 6 ft. 1 in. x 10 in.	Decatur Cemetery Association	
Natalia	Greg Mendez		Riverside Sculpture Park			City of Decatur	
The Neighborhood	Gary Hovey		Riverside Sculpture Park			City of Decatur	
Peace Monument	Charles J. Mulligan	1913	Adams County Courthouse 40°49′46.32″N 84°55′29.81″W	Limestone & Metal	Sculpture: approx. 16 ft. x 29 ft. x 8 ft. 6 in.	Adams County Commissioners	
Resilience	Gary Hovey		Riverside Sculpture Park	Bronze		City of Decatur	
St. Mary of the Assumption	Edward Schulte	1954	St. Mary of the Assumption Church 40°49′47.76″N 84°55′37.2″W	Limestone	Mary: approx. 10 x 3 x 1 /2 ft. Each relief panel: approx. 3 ft. x 4 1/2 ft. 8 1/2 in.	Roman Catholic Diocese of Fort Wayne-South Bend	
St. Joseph the Worker	Unknown	1984	St. Joseph Cemetery	Marble	Sculpture: approx. 6 ft. x 20 1/2 in. x 14 in.	St. Joseph Cemetery	
Seats Taken	Greg Mendez	2011	Riverside Sculpture Park	Bronze		City of Decatur	
Survival	Nathan Pierce		Riverside Sculpture Park			City of Decatur	
Undetermined Impact	Matt Miller	2011	Riverside Sculpture Park			City of Decatur	

== Allen ==
=== Yoder ===
Title	Artist	Year	Location/GPS Coordinates	Material	Dimensions	Owner	Image
Blessed Mother Holding Infant of Prague	Unknown	Before 1965	St. Aloysius Catholic Church	Concrete	Statue: approx. 63 x 18 x 15 in.	St. Aloysius Catholic Church	
St. Joseph	Unknown	ca. 1954	St. Aloysius Catholic Church	Metal	Statue: approx. 6 ft. x 3 ft. x 12 in.	St. Aloysius Catholic Church	
Statue of the Blessed Virgin Mary	Unknown	1974	St. Aloysius Catholic Church	Marble	Statue: approx. 62 x 25 x 11 1/2 in.	St. Aloysius Catholic Church	
Statue of the Sacred Heart	Unknown	1974	St. Aloysius Catholic Church	Marble	Figure: approx. 67 x 19 x 14 in.	St. Aloysius Catholic Church	

== Bartholomew ==
That list includes Columbus, Edinburgh, and Taylorsville.

== Benton ==
=== Earl Park ===
Title	Artist	Year	Location/GPS Coordinates	Material	Dimensions	Owner	Image
Crucifixion	Unknown	1946	St. John the Baptist Catholic Cemetery	Sheet metal	Sculpture: approx. 13 ft. x 87 in. x 23 in.	St. John the Baptist Catholic Church	
Sumner Monument	William Galloway	1882	Sumner Cemetery	Granite or Marble	Sculpture: approx. 7 x 3 1/2 x 3 ft.	Sumner Cemetery Association	

== Blackford ==
=== Hartford City ===
Title	Artist	Year	Location/GPS Coordinates	Material	Dimensions	Owner	Image
The Spirit of the American Doughboy	E. M. Viquesney	1920	Blackford County Courthouse 40°27′7.16″N 85°22′3.51″W	Bronze	Sculpture: approx. 7 ft. x 4 ft. 6 in. x 2 ft. 1 in.	Blackford County Commissioners	

=== Montpelier ===
Title	Artist	Year	Location/GPS Coordinates	Material	Dimensions	Owner	Image
Miami Indian	Unknown	ca. 1960	40°33′14.27″N 85°16′39.31″W	Fiberglass	Indian: approx. 25 ft. x 7 ft. 1 in. x 4 ft. 6 in.	City of Montpelier	
Statue of Soldier	W.A. Hoover	ca. 1945	American Legion 40°33′11.89″N 85°16′42.28″W	Concrete	Sculpture: approx. 5 ft. 6 in.x 1 ft. 4 in.x 1 ft.	American Legion	

== Boone ==
Includes Lebanon and Zionsville, Indiana.

== Brown ==
=== Stone Head ===
Title	Artist	Year	Location/GPS Coordinates	Material	Dimensions	Owner	Image
Stone Head Road Marker	Henry Cross	1851	Thomas A. Hendricks House 39°7′47″N 86°9′31″W	Sandstone	Approx. 28 x 16 x 11 in.	Alice Lorenz	

=== Story ===
Title	Artist	Year	Location/GPS Coordinates	Material	Dimensions	Owner	Image
Story Monument	William Galloway	1993	Intersection of SR 135 S. & Elkinsville Rd. 39°5′55.51″N 86°12′48.98″W	Limestone	Sculpture: approx. 17 x 3 1/2 x 3 1/2 ft.	Story Inn	

== Carroll ==
=== Delphi ===
Title	Artist	Year	Location/GPS Coordinates	Material	Dimensions	Owner	Image
Murphy Memorial Drinking Fountain	Myra Reynolds Richards	1916	Carroll County Courthouse	Bronze & Chrome	Sculpture: approx. 41 x 11 1/2 x 22 in.; Tablet: approx. H. 89 in.	Carroll County Commissioners	
Soldiers and Sailors Monument	Rudolph Schwarz; Bruno Schmitz	ca. 1886	Carroll County Courthouse 40°35′10.52″N 86°40′27.74″W	Bronze	Color Bearer: approx. 10 x 3 x 3 ft.	Carroll County Commissioners	

== Cass ==
Includes Galveston and Logansport, Indiana.

== Clark ==
=== Clarksville ===
Title	Artist	Year	Location/GPS Coordinates	Material	Dimensions	Owner	Image
St. Anthony	Unknown		St. Anthony of Padua School	Concrete	Sculpture: approx. 6 ft. 3 in. x 2 ft. x 1 ft. 8 in.	St. Anthony of Padua School	
St. Francis	Unknown	1930s	St. Anthony of Padua School	Concrete	Sculpture: approx. 6 ft. 3 in. x 2 ft. x 1 ft. 8 in.	St. Anthony of Padua School	

=== Jeffersonville ===
Title	Artist	Year	Location/GPS Coordinates	Material	Dimensions	Owner	Image
Cherokee Indian	Mike Hopkins	1992	1900 Utica Pike	Carved oak	Approx. H. 12 ft. x Diam. 33 in.	Keith & Caroline Russell	
Rebecca	Norman Kolhepp	1974	Howard Steamboat Museum	Bronze & Cast iron	Fountain sculpture: approx. 4 ft. x 12 in. x 11 in	Clark County Historical Society	
Veterans Monument	Bryan Moor	1987	City-County Building 38°16′38.40″N 85°44′12.92″W	Indiana limestone	Sculpture: approx. 15 x 6 x 6 ft.	City of Jeffersonville & Clark County	

== Clay ==
=== Brazil ===
Title	Artist	Year	Location/GPS Coordinates	Material	Dimensions	Owner	Image
Chafariz Dos Cantos	Tito Bernucci	1956	Forest Park	Granite, Paint, Stucco & Bronze	Overall: approx. 26 x 40 x 9 ft.	City of Brazil	
Stylized Athletes		1929	Former Brazil High School	Limestone	6 reliefs. Each relief: approx. 18 x 21 x 4 in.	Clay County School Corporation	

== Clinton ==
=== Frankfort ===
Title	Artist	Year	Location/GPS Coordinates	Material	Dimensions	Owner	Image
Angel	Unknown	ca. 1955	Greenlawn Cemetery	Marble	Sculpture: approx. 57 x 19 x 50 in.	Greenlawn Cemetery Association	
Christ	Unknown	ca. 1955	Greenlawn Cemetery	Marble	Figure: approx. 70 x 28 x 18 in.	Greenlawn Cemetery Association	
Justice and Progress	George Bunting	ca. 1882	Clinton County Courthouse	Granite, Paint, Stucco & Bronze	6 figures. Kneeling figures: approx. 6 ft. 5 in. x 5 ft. x 5 ft.; Standing figures: approx. 10 x 3 1/2 x 3 1/2 ft.	Clinton County Courthouse	

== Crawford ==
=== English ===
Title	Artist	Year	Location/GPS Coordinates	Material	Dimensions	Owner	Image
William English	John Mahoney	1891	English Park	Bronze	Sculpture: approx. 100 x 33 x 33 in.	Town of English	

== Daviess ==
=== Crane ===
Title	Artist	Year	Location/GPS Coordinates	Material	Dimensions	Owner	Image
Commodore Crane	Dominic Mazzullo	1943	Naval Surface Warfare Center Crane Division	Limestone	Sculpture: approx. 9 ft. 10 in. x 3 ft. x 3 ft.	Naval Surface Warfare Center Crane Division	
John D. Laughlin Monument	Unknown	ca. 1900	Williams Cemetery	Limestone	Sculpture: approx. 52 1/8 x 16 1/8 x 12 1/8 in.	Crane Naval Surface Warfare Center	

=== Montgomery ===
Title	Artist	Year	Location/GPS Coordinates	Material	Dimensions	Owner	Image
Anise E. Hart Monument	Ira Correll	ca. 1909	St. Peter's Cemetery	Limestone	Figure: approx. 6 ft. x 27 in. x 19 in.	St. Peter's Cemetery Road	

=== Odon ===
Title	Artist	Year	Location/GPS Coordinates	Material	Dimensions	Owner	Image
Abraham Lincoln	Ira Correll	1922	Old Settlers Park	Limestone	Sculpture: approx. 6 ft. x 2 f.t x 1 ft. 3 in.	City of Odon	

=== Washington ===
Title	Artist	Year	Location/GPS Coordinates	Material	Dimensions	Owner	Image
Soldier's Monument	John Walsh	1913	Daviess County Courthouse 38°39′31.94″N 87°10′22.26″W	Granite	Overall: approx. H. 30 ft.; Top figure: approx. H. 10 ft.; Proper left figure: approx. H. 6 ft.; Proper right figure: approx. H. 6 ft.	Daviess County Commissioners	

== Dearborn ==
=== Guilford ===
Title	Artist	Year	Location/GPS Coordinates	Material	Dimensions	Owner	Image
St. Paul	Unknown	ca. 1870	St. Paul Catholic Church39°14′3.72″N 84°59′58.73″W	Metal	Sculpture: approx. 7 ft. x 30 in. x 24 in.	Roman Catholic Archdiocese of Indianapolis	

=== Lawrenceburg ===
Title	Artist	Year	Location/GPS Coordinates	Material	Dimensions	Owner	Image
Blessed Mother	Unknown	ca. 1950	St. Lawrence Catholic Church	Marble	Figure: approx. 58 x 26 x 14 in.	Archdiocese of Indianapolis	
John Anderegg Portrait Medallion	Unknown	ca. 1885	Greendale Cemetery	Marble	Relief: approx. 25 x 14 x 5 in.	Greendale Cemetery	
Newtown Fountain	J. W. Fiske & Company	1924	Newton Park	Cast iron	Overall: approx. H. 10 ft.; Sculpture: approx. H. 4 ft. x Diam. 30 in.; Base: approx. H. 1 ft. x Diam. 36 in.; Basin: approx. H. 21 in. x Diam. 16 in.	City of Lawrenceburg	
St. Lawrence	Unknown		St. Lawrence Catholic Church	Limestone	Approx. 7 ft. x 30 in. x 20 in.	Archdiocese of Indianapolis	

== Decatur ==
=== Greensburg ===
Title	Artist	Year	Location/GPS Coordinates	Material	Dimensions	Owner	Image
Child	Unknown	ca. 1917	St. Mary's School	Marble	Sculpture: approx. 3 x 1 x 1 ft.	St. Mary's Church	
Rebekah	White Bronze Monument Company	1904	1021 E. Central	Bronze	Sculpture: approx. 6 ft. x 2 ft. x 1 ft. 6 in.		

=== Millhousen ===
Title	Artist	Year	Location/GPS Coordinates	Material	Dimensions	Owner	Image
Picker Monument	Unknown	ca. 1942	Immaculate Conception Cemetery	Limestone	Sculpture: approx. 4 ft. 6 in. x 1 ft. 8 in. x 1 ft. 8 in.	Immaculate Conception Church	
Mary Queen of Heaven	Unknown	1868	Immaculate Conception Catholic Church	Marble & Lamp	Approx. 7 x 2 1/2 x 2 ft.	Immaculate Conception Catholic Church	

=== Westport ===
Title	Artist	Year	Location/GPS Coordinates	Material	Dimensions	Owner	Image
Charles Robert Sample	D.J. Busch	1972	Westport Cemetery	Bronze	Sculpture: approx. 56 x 19 x 19 in.	Westport Cemetery	
John W. Shaw Memorial	Unknown	ca. 1900	Westport Cemetery	Limestone	Sculpture: approx. 38 x 18 x 16 in.	Westport Cemetery	

== DeKalb ==
=== Auburn ===
Title	Artist	Year	Location/GPS Coordinates	Material	Dimensions	Owner	Image
Eckhart Fountain	J. L. Mott Iron Works	1911	Eckhart Public Library and Park41°21′50.03″N 85°3′28.58″W	Metal, Steel & Concrete	Sculpture: approx. H. 5 ft. x Diam. 2 1/2 ft.; Basin: approx. 1 x 2 x 2 ft. x Diam. 21 ft. 6 in.	Eckhart Public Library and Park	
Entrance Monument, Catholic Cemetery	Henry Mascotte	1985	Catholic Cemetery	Reinforced Concrete & Steel	Sculpture: approx. 7 ft. x 18 ft. x 22 in.	Immaculate Conception Church	
Our Lady of Lourdes	Unknown	1963	Immaculate Conception Church	Marble	St. Bernadette: approx. 30 x 12 x 18 in.; Blessed Virgin: approx. 5 ft. x 19 in. x 14 in.; Planter base: approx. 7 in. x 6 ft. x 52 in.	Immaculate Conception Church	

=== Butler ===
Title	Artist	Year	Location/GPS Coordinates	Material	Dimensions	Owner	Image
Soldiers and Sailors Monument	Unknown	1907	Butler Cemetery	Granite	Sculpture: approx. 10 x 3 1/2 x 3 ft.	City of Butler	

=== Waterloo ===
Title	Artist	Year	Location/GPS Coordinates	Material	Dimensions	Owner	Image
Captain Samuel Edge Monument	Edward Geiselman	1893	Waterloo Memorial Cemetery	Limestone	Sculpture: approx. H. 5 x Diam. 3 1/2 ft.	Waterloo Memorial Cemetery Board	
The Resurrection	Unknown	1956	St. Michael's Catholic Church Cemetery	Concrete	Sculpture: approx. 68 x 36 x 18 in.	St. Michael's Catholic Church	
Untitled	Grogg Cement Block Company	1918	St. Michael's Catholic Church Cemetery	Concrete & Steel reinforcement	Cross: approx. H. 16 ft; Christ: approx. 8 ft. x 66 in. x 15 in.	St. Michael's Catholic Church	

== Delaware ==
=== Daleville ===
Title	Artist	Year	Location/GPS Coordinates	Material	Dimensions	Owner	Image
Illumination	Kenneth G. Ryden	1998	Daleville Community Library	Bronze	h. 7 ft.		

== Dubois ==
Includes Ferdinand, Celestine, Huntingburg, Ireland, Jasper, Schnellville, and Siberia, Indiana.

== Elkhart ==
Includes Bristol, Elkhart and Goshen, Indiana.

== Fayette ==
=== Connersville ===
Title	Artist	Year	Location/GPS Coordinates	Material	Dimensions	Owner	Image
St. Gabriel	Unknown	1927	St. Gabriel Catholic School	Marble	Approx. 6 x 2 1/2 x 2 ft.	St. Gabriel Catholic School	

== Floyd ==
Includes Mount St. Francis and New Albany, Indiana.

== Fountain ==
=== Attica ===
Title	Artist	Year	Location/GPS Coordinates	Material	Dimensions	Owner	Image
The Spirit of the American Doughboy	E. M. Viquesney	1920	Attica Public Library	Bronze	Sculpture: approx. 7 x 2 1/2 x 2 ft.	Attica Public Library	

== Franklin ==
=== Brookville ===
Title	Artist	Year	Location/GPS Coordinates	Material	Dimensions	Owner	Image
St. Michael		1934	St. Michael's Catholic Church	Marble	Sculpture: approx. 58 x 14 x 14 1/2 in.	St. Michael's Catholic Church	

=== Oldenburg ===
Title	Artist	Year	Location/GPS Coordinates	Material	Dimensions	Owner	Image
Friendship Garden Plaque	Joe Geier	1978	Sisters of St. Francis	Cast Aluminum	Approx. 47 x 35 x 3 in.	Sisters of St. Francis	
St. Francis and Guardian Angel	Unknown	1901	Sisters of Saint Francis Convent and Church	Limestone	Approx. 7 1/2 x 3 1/2 x 2 1/2 ft.	Sisters of Saint Francis Convent and Church	

== Fulton ==
=== Rochester ===
Title	Artist	Year	Location/GPS Coordinates	Material	Dimensions	Owner	Image
Courthouse Lions	A.W. Rush & Son	1896	Fulton County Courthouse	Limestone	10 lions. Each lion: approx. 39 x 20 x 59 in.	Fulton County Commissioners	

== Gibson ==
=== Oakland City ===
Title	Artist	Year	Location/GPS Coordinates	Material	Dimensions	Owner	Image
Company F. 42nd Indiana Monument	William Kelley	1894	American Legion #256 Johnson-Curd Post 38°20′18.63″N 87°20′38.33″W	Limestone	Sculpture: approx. 5 ft. x 20 in. x 18 in.	American Legion #256 Johnson-Curd Post	

=== Princeton ===
Title	Artist	Year	Location/GPS Coordinates	Material	Dimensions	Owner	Image
58th Indiana Regiment Monument	C. Rule & Coleman	1865	Gibson County Courthouse 38°21′19.81″N 87°34′6.35″W	Marble	Eagle: approx. 5 ft. x 20 in. x 18 in., Shaft: approx. 25 ft. x 47 in. x 47 in.	Gibson County Administrators	
Gibson County Soldiers and Sailors Monument	Rudolf Schwarz	1912	Gibson County Courthouse 38°21′19.51″N 87°34′3.88″W	Bronze	5 figures. Flagbearer: approx. H. 12 ft.; Four lower figures: each approx. 8 x 2 x 2 ft.	Gibson County Administrators	

== Greene ==
=== Linton ===
Title	Artist	Year	Location/GPS Coordinates	Material	Dimensions	Owner	Image
Levi Price Monument	Wilbur Wright Marbler	ca. 1910	Fairview Cemetery	Granite	Sculpture: approx. 63 x 16 x 12 in.	Fairview Cemetery	

== Grant ==
=== Marion ===
Title	Artist	Year	Location/GPS Coordinates	Material	Dimensions	Owner	Image
Soldier's Monument	Lorado Taft	1914	Marion National Cemetery	Bronze with green patina	Sculpture: 10 ft. x 5 ft. 9 in. x 3 ft. 1 in.	United States Department of Veterans Affairs & Veterans Administration Hospital	

=== Swayzee ===
Title	Artist	Year	Location/GPS Coordinates	Material	Dimensions	Owner	Image
Civil War Monument	James Mullins	1910	Thrailkill Cemetery	Limestone	Sculpture: approx. 8 1/2 ft. x 30 in. x 22 in.	Thrailkill Cemetery	

=== Upland ===
Title	Artist	Year	Location/GPS Coordinates	Material	Dimensions	Owner	Image
The Flexing of Florida, Part I	Roger Machin	1984	Taylor University	Galvanized Steel	Sculpture: approx. H. 43 ft. x Diam. 22 ft.	Taylor University	

== Hancock ==
=== Greenfield ===
Title	Artist	Year	Location/GPS Coordinates	Material	Dimensions	Owner	Image
James Whitcomb Riley	Myra Reynolds Richards	1918	Hancock County Courthouse39°47′6.21″N 85°46′7.94″W	Bronze	Sculpture: approx. 5 ft. 5 in. x 2 ft. 2 in. x 2 ft. 2 in.	Hancock County Commissioners	
Paul D. Stine Memorial	Unknown	1940	Park Cemetery	Bronze	Sculpture: approx. 5 ft. 5 in. x 1 ft. 9 in. x 1 ft. 2 in.; Base: approx. 4 in. x 1 ft. 3 in. x 1 ft. 3 in.	Park Cemetery Association	

== Hendricks ==
=== Plainfield ===
Title	Artist	Year	Location/GPS Coordinates	Material	Dimensions	Owner	Image
Barefoot Boy	Gabriel Garibay	1929	Plainfield Juvenile Correctional Facility	Indiana limestone	Sculpture: approx. 76 x 18 x 18 in.	Indiana Department of Corrections	

== Henry ==
=== Knightstown ===
Title	Artist	Year	Location/GPS Coordinates	Material	Dimensions	Owner	Image
(Fountain)	J. W. Fiske & Company	1920s	Glen Cove Cemetery39°48′12.53″N 85°31′59.65″W	Cast iron	Sculpture: approx. H. 3 ft. x Diam. 2 ft.	Glen Cove Cemetery Association	

=== New Castle ===
Title	Artist	Year	Location/GPS Coordinates	Material	Dimensions	Owner	Image
Civil War Monument	American Bronze Company	1923	Henry County Courthouse (Indiana)39°55′51.41″N 85°22′13.75″W	Bronze	Sculpture: approx. 9 ft. x 2 ft. 4 in. x 2 ft. 4 in.	Henry County Commissioners	

== Huntington ==
=== Huntington ===
Title	Artist	Year	Location/GPS Coordinates	Material	Dimensions	Owner	Image
Statue of 4 Apostles	Unknown		Gardens of Memory	Marble	4 figures. Each figure: approx. 6 ft. 3 in. x 1 ft. 6 in. x 1 ft. 3 in.; Each base: approx. H. 2 in. x Diam. 2 ft. 3 in.	Huntington County Gardens of Memory	

== Jasper ==
=== Rensselaer ===
Title	Artist	Year	Location/GPS Coordinates	Material	Dimensions	Owner	Image
Saint Joseph the Educator	Robert Rigali, Jr.	1991	Saint Joseph's College	Carrara marble	Sculpture: approx. 96 x 65 x 36 in.	Saint Joseph's College	
Reverend Augustine Seifert C.P.P.S.	Unknown	1941	Saint Joseph's College, Seifert Hall	Limestone	Sculpture: approx. 74 x 24 x 13 in.	Saint Joseph's College	

== Jefferson ==
=== Madison ===
Title	Artist	Year	Location/GPS Coordinates	Material	Dimensions	Owner	Image
Broadway Fountain	Victor J.P. Andre	ca. 1876	Broadway Esplanade, North of Main St. 38°44′14.78″N 85°22′58.8″W	Bronze	Fountain: approx. H. 27 ft.; Pool: approx. Diam. 35 1/2 ft.	City of Madison	
Immortality	George Grey Barnard	1928	Springvale Cemetery	Marble	Sculpture: approx. 11 1/2 ft. x 4 ft. x 40 in.	Springvale Cemetery	
Soldier's Monument	Lorado Zadoc Taft	1915	Marion National Cemetery	Bronze	Sculpture: approx. 10 ft. x 5 ft. 9 in. x 3 ft. 1 in.	United States Department of Veterans Affairs & Veterans Administration Hospital	
Soldiers and Sailors Monument	Sigvald Asbjornsen	1907	Jefferson County Courthouse 38°44′9.8″N 85°22′33.48″W	Bronze	Sculpture: approx. 14 x 8 x 7 ft.	Jefferson County Commissioners	
Statue of Liberty Replica	Frédéric Auguste Bartholdi	1950	Jefferson County Courthouse	Sheet copper, primer	Figure: approx. 8 ft. x 22 1/2 in. x 22 1/2 in.	Jefferson County Commissioners	

== Jennings ==
=== North Vernon ===
Title	Artist	Year	Location/GPS Coordinates	Material	Dimensions	Owner	Image
Lions (2 Male, 2 Female)	Thomas Brolley	ca. 1890	435 4th St. 39°0′39.95″N 85°37′29.97″W	Limestone	4 lions. Each male lion: approx. 15 x 17 1/2 x 38 in. Each lioness: approx. 33 x 17 x 33 in.		

== Johnson ==
=== Franklin ===
Title	Artist	Year	Location/GPS Coordinates	Material	Dimensions	Owner	Image
Benjamin Franklin	John H. Mahoney	1875	Franklin College	Marble	Figure: approx. 94 x 36 x 23 in.	Franklin College	
Vawter Memorial	Rudolf Schwarz	1905	Johnson County Courthouse	Bronze	Sculpture: approx. 6 x 3 x 3 1/2 ft.	Johnson County	

=== Greenwood ===
Title	Artist	Year	Location/GPS Coordinates	Material	Dimensions	Owner	Image
4 Apostles	Tavarelli Marble Works	ca. late 1970s	Forest Lawn Memory Gardens	Marble	4 sculptures. Each sculpture: approx. 6 ft. 7 in. x 30 in. x 2 ft. 9 in.	Forest Lawn Memory Gardens	

== Knox ==
=== Vincennes ===
Title	Artist	Year	Location/GPS Coordinates	Material	Dimensions	Owner	Image
Knox County Courthouse Figures and Relief	Andrea Barrot	1874	Knox County Courthouse 38°40′35.09″N 87°31′37.06″W	Marble	3 figures, 2 reliefs. Each figure: approx. 9 x 3 x 2 1/2 ft.	Knox County Commissioners	
Soldiers and Sailors Monument	Rudolf Schwarz	ca. 1913	Knox County Courthouse 38°40′36.67″N 87°31′36.48″W	Bronze	Top figure: approx. 10 x 4 x 4 ft.; Each lower figure: approx. H. 7 1/2 ft.; Shaft: approx. 40 x 4 x 4 ft.; Building: approx. 15 x 18 x 18 ft.	Knox County Commissioners	
St. Patrick, St. Francis Xavier and St. Joan of Arc	Unknown	ca. 1908	St. Francis Xavier Cathedral and Library 38°40′35.09″N 87°31′37.06″W	Painted concrete	3 figures, each approx. 6 x 2 1/2 x 2 ft.	Diocese of Evansville	

== Kosciusko ==
=== Mentone ===
Title	Artist	Year	Location/GPS Coordinates	Material	Dimensions	Owner	Image
Mentone Egg	Hugh Rickel	1946	Mentone Chamber of Commerce41°10′23.64″N 86°2′4.74″W	Painted concrete	Sculpture: approx. H. 10 ft. x Diam. 7 3/4 ft.	Mentone Chamber of Commerce	

== Lake ==
Includes Crown Point, Dyer, East Chicago, Gary, Hammond, Merrillville, Munster and Whiting, Indiana.

== LaPorte ==
Includes LaPorte and Michigan City, Indiana.

== Lawrence ==
=== Bedford ===
Title	Artist	Year	Location/GPS Coordinates	Material	Dimensions	Owner	Image
Baker Monument	Marion Taylor	c. 1918 or 1929	Green Hill Cemetery	Limestone	Sculpture: approx. 52 in. x 4 ft. x 2 ft.; Base: approx. 5 x 50 x 33 in.	Green Hill Cemetery	
Easter Island Figures	Criston East	1983	Thorton Park38°51′36.72″N 86°29′47.4″W	Indiana Limestone	2 heads. Head I: approx. 122 x 44 x 39 in.; Head II: approx. 9 1/2 ft. x 33 in. x 39 in.	City of Bedford	
Michael Wallner Monument	Frank Arena	1942	Green Hill Cemetery	Limestone	Sculpture: approx. 6 ft. x 18 in. x 19 in.		
Stone crucifix	A.G. Meister		St. Vincent de Paul Church38°51′31.77″N 86°28′58.20″W	Limestone	Approx. 9 1/2 x 6 x 4 ft.	St. Vincent de Paul Church	
Stonecutter's Monument	Unknown	1894	Green Hill Cemetery	Limestone	Sculpture: approx. 100 x 33 x 33 in.; Base: approx. 134 x 67 x 67 in.	Green Hill Cemetery	

=== Oolitic ===
Title	Artist	Year	Location/GPS Coordinates	Material	Dimensions	Owner	Image
Eagles	Criston East	1983	Indiana Limestone Company, Mill Entrance, Junction of Old SR 37 & New SR 37	Indiana Limestone	2 eagles. Each eagle: approx. 65 x 30 x 71 in.	Indiana Limestone Company	
Joe Palooka	George Hitchcock	1948		Indiana Limestone	Sculpture: approx. 102 x 51 x 35 in.	City of Oolitic	

== Madison ==
Includes Anderson and Chesterfield, Indiana.

== Marshall ==
=== Plymouth ===
Title	Artist	Year	Location/GPS Coordinates	Material	Dimensions	Owner	Image
Chief Menominee Monument	Samuel Novelli	1909	Chief Menominee Memorial Site	Granite	Approx. 7 ft. x 42 in. x 42 in	Marshall County Commissioners	
Statue of Liberty Replica	Frédéric Auguste Bartholdi	1951	Marshall County Courthouse41°20′37.99″N 86°18′40.18″W	Metal	Approx. 7 3/4 ft. x 22 1/2 in. x 22 1/2 in.	Marshall County Commissioners	

== Miami ==
=== Peru ===
Title	Artist	Year	Location/GPS Coordinates	Material	Dimensions	Owner	Image
Statue of Liberty Replica	Frédéric Auguste Bartholdi	1951	Miami County Courthouse40°45′15.02″N 86°4′6.55″W	Coated metal	Approx. 10 ft. x 22 in. x 22 in.	Miami County Commissioners	

== Monroe ==
=== Clear Creek ===
Title	Artist	Year	Location/GPS Coordinates	Material	Dimensions	Owner	Image
Pieta	Dugan Elgar	1968	Clear Creek Christian Church Cemetery	Marble	Sculpture: approx. 38 x 36 x 22 in.	Clear Creek Christian Church	

== Montgomery ==
=== Crawfordsville ===
Title	Artist	Year	Location/GPS Coordinates	Material	Dimensions	Owner	Image
David Wallace Medallion	Henry M. Saunders	1898	General Lew Wallace Study	Limestone	Sculpture: approx. 32 x 25.5 x 24 in.	General Lew Wallace Study	
Lew Wallace	Andrew O'Connor, Jr.	1910	General Lew Wallace Study	Bronze	Approx. 6 ft. x 29.5 in. x 23 in.	General Lew Wallace Study	
Nathaniel Parker Willis Monument	George Julian Zolnay	1912	Oak Hill Cemetery	Bronze	Approx. 32 x 26 x 3/4 in.	Oak Hill Cemetery	
Sermon on the Mount	Matthews International	1967	Oak Hill Cemetery	Marble	Approx. 5 ft. x 27 in. x 33 in.	Oak Hill Cemetery	
Soldiers and Sailors Monument	Rudolf Schwarz	1906	Montgomery County Courthouse	Bronze	Overall: approx. 38 ft.; Female: approx. 8 x 3 1/2 x 1 1/2 ft.; Each soldier: approx. 6 x 3 x 3 ft.: Shaft and base: approx. 30 x 16 x 16 ft.	Montgomery County Commissioners	

== Noble ==
=== Rome City ===
Title	Artist	Year	Location/GPS Coordinates	Material	Dimensions	Owner	Image
St. Gaspar	Unknown	1958	St. Gaspar's Catholic Church	Marble	Figure: approx. 76 x 33 x 14 in.		

== Parke ==
=== Marshall ===
Title	Artist	Year	Location/GPS Coordinates	Material	Dimensions	Owner	Image
Juliet V. Strauss Memorial	Myra Reynolds Richards	1921	Turkey Run State Park	Bronze	Statue: approx. 68 x 48 x 40 in.	State of Indiana	

=== Rockville ===
Title	Artist	Year	Location/GPS Coordinates	Material	Dimensions	Owner	Image
World War Memorial	Theodore Gaebler	1930	Parke County Courthouse 39°45′42.41″N 87°13′43.35″W	Limestone	Statue: approx. 6 ft. x 22 in. x 22 in.	Parke County Commissioners	

== Perry ==
=== Siberia ===
Title	Artist	Year	Location/GPS Coordinates	Material	Dimensions	Owner	Image
Cruxifixion	Unknown	1934	Saint Martin of Tours Cemetery	Concrete	Sculpture: 3 ft. x 5 1/2 ft. x 20 in.	St. Martin of Tours Parish	

=== Tell City ===
Title	Artist	Year	Location/GPS Coordinates	Material	Dimensions	Owner	Image
Mary	Kaletta Company	1952	St. Mark's Catholic Church38°1′14.64″N 86°42′33.54″W	Painted Concrete	Sculpture: approx. 60 x 22 x 16 in.	St. Mark's Catholic Church	
William Tell and Son, Walter	Donald Ingle	1974	Tell City City Hall38°57′5.52″N 86°46′10.28″W	Bronze	Sculpture: approx. 73 x 38 x 36 in.	City of Tell City	

=== Troy ===
Title	Artist	Year	Location/GPS Coordinates	Material	Dimensions	Owner	Image
Christ of the Ohio	Herbert Jogerst	1956	Fulton Hill	White Portland cement	Sculpture: approx. 11 ft. 4 in. x 7 ft. x 23 in.	Town of Troy	

== Pike ==
=== Petersburg ===
Title	Artist	Year	Location/GPS Coordinates	Material	Dimensions	Owner	Image
Hornady Monument	J. L. Mott Iron Works	ca. 1900	Walnut Hill Cemetery	White bronze	Approx. 43 x 52 x 20 in.	Odd Fellows Pacific Lodge IOOF #175	

== Porter ==
=== Valparaiso ===
Title	Artist	Year	Location/GPS Coordinates	Material	Dimensions	Owner	Image
Francis Vigo	John Angel	1936	George Rogers Clark National Historical Park38°40′46.83″N 87°32′9.75″W	Granite		National Park Service	
Phoenix II	Richard Montgomery	1987	Mueller Hall, Valparaiso University	Clay, scrap metal, found objects	94 x 35 x 23 in.	Valparaiso University, Brauer Museum of Art	
The Resurrection	E.N. Rutkowski	1970	Seven Dolors Shrine	Painted bronze powder mixture with Romplex Ac33 used for finished cast over, on a mortared tuff stone base	Sculpture: 12 ft. x 44 in. x 15 in.	Seven Dolors Shrine	
St. Paul	Cesaer Bobis		St. Paul Church	Bronze, scrap metal, branches & found objects	Sculpture: approx. 8 ft. x 26 in. x 24 in.	St. Paul Catholic Church	

== Posey ==
=== Mount Vernon ===
Title	Artist	Year	Location/GPS Coordinates	Material	Dimensions	Owner	Image
Alvin P. Hovey Monument	John Walsh, Ira Nye	1893	Bellefontaine Cemetery	Bronze, barre granite, marble	Relief: approx. 6 ft. x 4 ft. x 3 in.; Base and obelisk: approx. 13 ft. 4 in. x 9 ft. 3 in. x 6 ft. (88,000 lbs.).	Bellefontaine Cemetery Association	

== Pulaski ==
=== Winamac ===
Title	Artist	Year	Location/GPS Coordinates	Material	Dimensions	Owner	Image
Faces on the Courthouse	A. W. Rush & Son (architect)	1895	Pulaski County Courthouse (Indiana)41°3′3.73″N 86°36′12.22″W	Limestone	2 faces. Each: approx. 4 ft. x 3 1/2 ft. x 1 1/2 in.	Pulaski County Commissioners	
Indian Head Gateway	Russell Rearick	1934	Winamac City Park 41°3′0.71″N 86°35′49.91″W	Indiana limestone & stone	2 heads. Each head: approx. 3 x 3 x 2 ft.	Town of Winamac	

== Putnam ==
=== Greencastle ===
Title	Artist	Year	Location/GPS Coordinates	Material	Dimensions	Owner	Image
Civil War Memorial	Thomas Dow Jones	1870	Forest Hill Cemetery	Sandstone	Sculpture: approx. 10 x 5 x 5 ft.	City of Greencastle	
The Owl	Allen George Newman	1903	DePauw University, East College	Bronze	Owl: approx 3 ft. x 10 in. x 8 in.; Fish: approx. 2 1/2 ft. x 9 in. x 6 in.	DePauw University	

== Randolph ==
=== Winchester ===
Title	Artist	Year	Location/GPS Coordinates	Material	Dimensions	Owner	Image
Soldiers and Sailor Monument	Lorado Taft	1890	Randolph County Courthouse 40°10′20.48″N 84°58′53.48″W	Bronze	Top figure: approx. 12 x 3 x 3 ft.; Lower figures: approx. 8 ft. x 6 ft. 8 in. x 3 ft.	Randolph County	

== Ripley ==
=== Batesville ===
Title	Artist	Year	Location/GPS Coordinates	Material	Dimensions	Owner	Image
Crucifixion	Kalette Company	before 1935	St. Louis Catholic Cemetery	Concrete	Christ: approx. 12 ft. x 66 in. x 20 in.; Mary and St. John: each approx. 59 x 18 x 16 in.; Cross: approx. 48 x 84 x 59 in.	St. Louis Catholic Church	

== Rush ==
=== Carthage ===
Title	Artist	Year	Location/GPS Coordinates	Material	Dimensions	Owner	Image
Henry Henley Relief	W.S. Kaufman	1902	Henry Henly Public Library39°44′21.38″N 85°34′18.54″W	Stone	Approx. 2 ft. x 1 ft. x 4 in.	Carthage Public Library	

=== Rushville ===
Title	Artist	Year	Location/GPS Coordinates	Material	Dimensions	Owner	Image
Reverend James H. Havens Portrait	Carpenter & Vickrey (fabricator)	1864	East Hill Cemetery	Marble	Approx. 2 ft. 2 in. x 1 ft. 9 in. x 4 in.	East Hill Cemetery Association	
Courthouse relief	A.W. Rush & Son	1896	Rush County Courthouse	Limestone	Approx. 3 ft. x 5 ft. 3 in. x 1 in.	Rush County Courthouse	
Wendell Willkie Grave	Malvina Hoffman	1946	East Hill Cemetery	Granite	2 parts. Book: approx. 9 in x 3 ft. 6 in.x 5 ft. 3 in.; Cross: approx. 10 ft. 2 in. x 3 ft. 9 in. x 5 in.; Cross base: approx. 5 ft. 9 in. x 4 ft. x 4 in.	East Hill Cemetery Association	

== St. Joseph ==
Includes Mishawaka, Notre Dame, Osceola, and South Bend.

== Scott ==
=== Scottsburg ===
Title	Artist	Year	Location/GPS Coordinates	Material	Dimensions	Owner	Image
William H. English	John Mahoney	ca. 1894	Scott County Courthouse 38°41′8.04″N 85°46′11.22″W	Bronze	Sculpture: approx. 8 ft. x 38 in. x 30 in.	Scott County Commissioners	

== Spencer ==
Includes Lincoln City, Mariah Hill, Saint Meinrad, and Santa Claus, Indiana.

== Steuben ==
=== Angola ===
Title	Artist	Year	Location/GPS Coordinates	Material	Dimensions	Owner	Image
Steuben County Soldier's Monument	J.C. Ayers	1917	Philadelphia Square, State Rt 20 & City Rt 42741°38′5.55″N 84°59′57.42″W	Bronze	Sculpture: approx. 10 x 5 x 4 ft.	City of Angola	

== Tippecanoe ==
Includes Battle Ground, Cairo, Lafayette, and West Lafayette, Indiana.

== Tipton ==
=== Tipton ===
Title	Artist	Year	Location/GPS Coordinates	Material	Dimensions	Owner	Image
St. Joseph and Relief Panels	Unknown		Sisters of St. Joseph	Limestone	Figure: approx. 82 x 28 x 15 in.; Platform: approx. 15 in. x 3 ft. x 18 in.; Each relief panel: approx. 30 x 22 x 2 in.	Sisters of St. Joseph	
St. Theresa, the Little Flower	Unknown	1926	Sisters of St. Joseph	Limestone, stone	Sculpture: approx. 62 x 23 x 17 in.; Grotto: approx. 122 x 106 x 82 in.	Sisters of St. Joseph	

== Vermillion ==
=== Clinton ===
Title	Artist	Year	Location/GPS Coordinates	Material	Dimensions	Owner	Image
Claude Matthews Medallion	Henry M. Saunders	1898	Bogart Park39°39′34.38″N 87°23′58.22″W	Limestone	Sculpture: approx. 2 ft. 8 in. x 2 ft. 6 in. x 2 ft. 5 in.; Medallion: approx. Diam. 25 in.	City of Clinton	
Young Immigrant	Carlo Avenati	ca. 1970	Immigranti Piazzo 39°40′23.26″N 87°24′31.11″W	Bronze	Figure: approx. 5 ft. 6 in. x 2 ft. 6 in. x 4 ft. 6 in.	LIFT	

== Vigo ==
Includes Saint Mary-of-the-Woods, Terre Haute, and West Terre Haute, Indiana.

== Wabash ==
=== Wabash ===
Title	Artist	Year	Location/GPS Coordinates	Material	Dimensions	Owner	Image
Lincoln Memorial	Charles Keck	1932	Wabash County Courthouse40°47′54″N 85°49′15″W	Bronze	Sculpture: approx. 7 ft. x 5 ft. 7 in. x 5 ft. 7 in.	Wabash County Commissioners	

== Warrick ==
=== Boonville ===
Title	Artist	Year	Location/GPS Coordinates	Material	Dimensions	Owner	Image
Commemorative Relief Medallions: William Fortune, Abraham Lincoln, James A. Hemenway	George H. Honig	1932–1938	Warrick County Courthouse	Bronze, limestone, Kentucky sandstone	3 markers. (Lincoln: approx. 22 1/2 x 19 x 1 in.; Base: 84 in. x 66 in. x 2 ft.); (Fortune and Hemenway: each approx. D. 1 1/2 in. x Diam. 17 in.; Each base approx. 59 in. x 66 in. x 2 ft.).	Warrick County Commissioners	
Ratliff Boon Medallion	Henry M. Saunders	1898	Warrick County Courthouse	Limestone	Medallion: approx. 32 x 26 x 16 in.	Warrick County Commissioners	

== Washington ==
=== Salem ===
Title	Artist	Year	Location/GPS Coordinates	Material	Dimensions	Owner	Image
Lion	Collins James Morgan	1884	24 Public Square	Limestone	Lion: approx. 33 x 24 x 49 in.		

== Wayne ==
=== Cambridge City ===
Title	Artist	Year	Location/GPS Coordinates	Material	Dimensions	Owner	Image
Louis P. Klieber Monument	Repp Monument Company (fabricator)	1930s	Riverside Cemetery	Granite	Sculpture: approx. 5 ft. x 30 in. x 30 in.	Town of Cambridge City	
Major General Sol Meredith Monument	John Mahoney	ca. 1876	Riverside Cemetery	Marble	Sculpture: approx. 7 ft. 3 in. x 36 in. x 30 in.	Town of Cambridge City	

=== Richmond ===
Title	Artist	Year	Location/GPS Coordinates	Material	Dimensions	Owner	Image
Hands Holding The Rose	William Magaw	1993	Glenn Miller Park	Cor-Ten steel	Sculpture: approx. H. 13 ft. x Diam. 4 ft.	City of Richmond	
Madonna of the Trail	Auguste Leimbach	1928	Glenn Miller Park	Algonite	Sculpture: approx. 9 ft. x 48 in. x 48 in.	City of Richmond	
Seal of the County Commissioners	James W. McLaughlin	1891	Wayne County Courthouse 39°49′42.65″N 84°53′50.22″W	Limestone	Approx. D. 6 in. x Diam. 5 ft.	Wayne County Commissioners	

== Wells ==
=== Bluffton ===
Title	Artist	Year	Location/GPS Coordinates	Material	Dimensions	Owner	Image
Recording Angel	Unknown	ca. 1960	Elk Grove Cemetery	Marble	Approx. 6 x 3 x 2 ft.	Bluffton Cemeteries	
St. Joseph the Educator	Hector Garcia	1964	St. Joseph Catholic Church 40°45′42.13″N 85°10′0.65″W	Limestone	Relief: approx. 7 ft. x 36 in. x 18 in.	St. Joseph Catholic Church	
Wells County Courthouse Grotesques	George Bunting	1891	Wells County Courthouse 40°44′22.12″N 85°10′18.36″W	Sandstone	Serpent: approx. 58 x 48 x 28 in.; Northeast gargoyle: approx. 30 x 28 x 16 in.; Southeast gargoyle: approx. 24 x 36 x 14 in.	Wells County Commissioners	

=== Ossian ===
Title	Artist	Year	Location/GPS Coordinates	Material	Dimensions	Owner	Image
Recording Angel	Unknown	1959	Oak Lawn Cemetery	Marble	Sculpture: approx. 6 x 3 x 2 ft.	Oak Lawn Cemetery	

=== Zanesville ===
Title	Artist	Year	Location/GPS Coordinates	Material	Dimensions	Owner	Image
Hoverstock Monument	Unknown	1889	Hoverstock Cemetery	Marble	Sculpture: approx. 5 1/2 ft. x 3 ft. x 16 in.	Hoverstock Cemetery	

== White ==
=== Monticello ===
Title	Artist	Year	Location/GPS Coordinates	Material	Dimensions	Owner	Image
Keystone and Cornerstone From Old White County Courthouse	LaBelle and French	1894	White County Courthouse	Limestone	Keystone: approx. 54 x 40 x 18 1/2 in.; Cornerstone: approx. 20 x 78 x 26 in.	White County Commissioners	

== Whitley ==
=== Columbia City ===
Title	Artist	Year	Location/GPS Coordinates	Material	Dimensions	Owner	Image
Cityscape of Columbia City, Indiana and Figure of St. Paul	Henry Mascotte	1989	St. Paul of the Cross Catholic Church 41°9′15.19″N 85°29′27.55″W	Concrete	2 pieces. Cityscape: approx. 4 ft. 6 in. x 12 ft. x 6 in. (1,200 lbs.); St. Paul: approx. 7 ft. 6 in. x 6 ft. x 6 in. (800 lbs.)	St. Paul of the Cross Catholic Church	
Heads in Relief	Giere	1888	Whitley County Courthouse	Limestone	Liberty: approx. 22 x 16 x 18 in.; Each animal: approx. D. 2 in. x Diam. 18 in.	Whitley County Commissioners	
