= Memorial to Company A, Capitol Guards =

- Formerly listed on the U.S. National Register of Historic Places
- U.S. Historic district – Contributing property
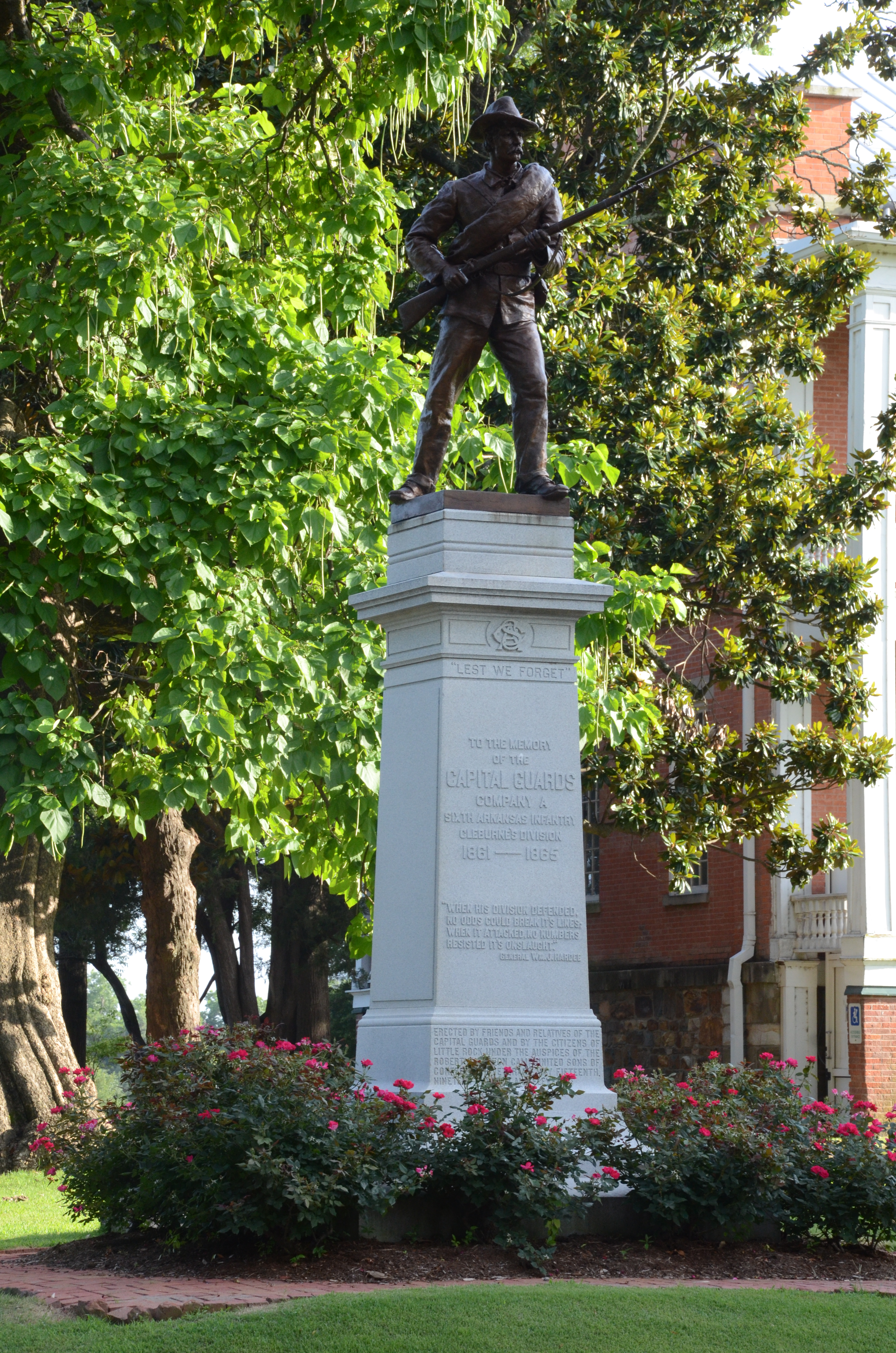

- Location within Arkansas Location within the United States
- Location: MacArthur Park, Little Rock, Arkansas
- Coordinates: 34°44′18″N 92°15′54″W
- Area: less than one acre
- Built: 1911
- Sculptor: Rudolph Schwarz
- Architectural style: Classical Revival
- Part of: MacArthur Park Historic District (ID77000269)
- MPS: Civil War Commemorative Sculpture MPS
- NRHP reference No.: 96000451

Significant dates
- Added to NRHP: April 26, 1996
- Designated CP: July 25, 1977
- Removed from NRHP: May 12, 2021

The Memorial to Company A, Capitol Guards (also known as the Capitol Guards Monument) was an American Civil War memorial in MacArthur Park, Little Rock, Arkansas. It stood just northeast of the former Tower Building of the Little Rock Arsenal, at a junction of two of the park's internal roadways. It consisted of a bronze sculpture depicting a Confederate Army soldier in a defensive stance, holding a rifle pointed forward. The statue was 8 feet (2.4 m) in height, and was mounted in a granite column 16 feet (4.9 m) tall. The memorial was sometimes known as "Lest we forget", a line that appeared near the top of the inscription on the base. The statue was created by sculptor Rudolph Schwarz, and was installed in 1911; it was paid for by the local chapter of the Sons of Confederate Veterans, and memorializes the unit that seized the arsenal at the outset of the war.

The memorial was listed on the National Register of Historic Places in 1996, and was delisted in 2021. The statue was removed in June 2020 following the George Floyd protests.

== See also ==
- National Register of Historic Places listings in Little Rock, Arkansas
- Removal of Confederate monuments and memorials
