= Abraham Lincoln (relief by Schwarz) =

Work of public art

Abraham Lincoln commemorative plaque
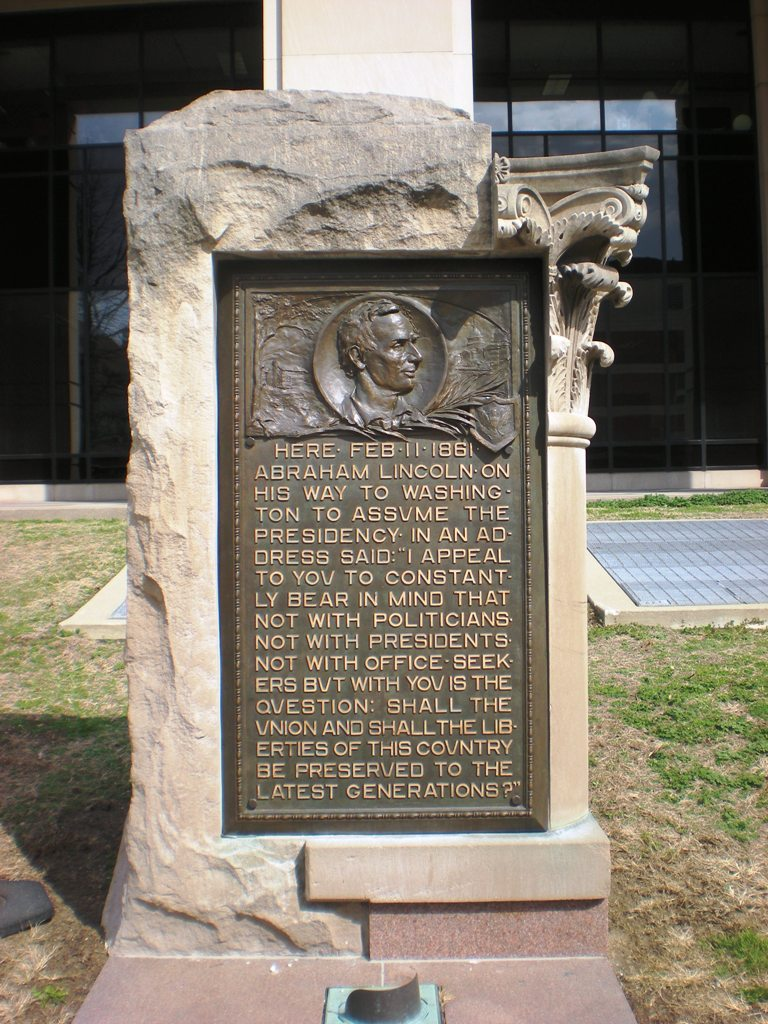
- Artist: Rudolph Schwarz (sculptor) and Marie Stewart (designer)
- Year: 1906
- Type: bronze plaque set in limestone
- Dimensions: 170 cm × 89 cm (65 in × 35 in)
- Location: Indianapolis, IN; 39°46′2.71″N 86°9′54.48″W
- Owner: State of Indiana

The Abraham Lincoln commemorative plaque is a work of public art designed by Marie Stewart in 1906, created by Rudolph Schwarz, and dedicated on 12 February 1907.

The bronze plaque is set in a limestone base and stands near the Indiana Government Center South, at the intersection of West Washington and South Missouri Streets in downtown Indianapolis, Indiana. Stewart, an Indianapolis high school student, submitted the winning entry in a citywide design contest to commemorate Lincoln's visit to Indianapolis on 11 February 1861. Lincoln was traveling to Washington D.C. for his inauguration and first term as president of the United States. The bronze plaque's relief depicts Lincoln's profile in a medallion at the center; the U.S. Capitol is on the proper left; a log cabin is on the proper right. The plaque's inscription quotes a speech that Lincoln delivered on 11 February 1861 in Indianapolis. The base remains rough, with the exception of a carved Corinthian column and capital adhered to the southeast corner.

== Description ==
The rectangular, coated-bronze plaque measures approximately 65 in. x 37 in. x 1 1/3 in.; it is set in a rough-hewn limestone base measuring approximately 89 in x 54 in. x 39 in. A relief comprises the upper one-third, 17 inches (43 centimeters), of the plaque. At its center a medallion has relief of Abraham Lincoln's proper right profile; he does not have a beard. A relief of the U.S. Capitol appears on the proper left side; a tree and a log cabin are on the proper right side. A large palm frond beneath the medallion extends to the proper left. A shield with an eagle design is on the proper left, below the Capitol building. The log cabin represents Lincoln's boyhood home in southern Indiana; the Capitol building relates to his future as president of the United States. Lincoln's profile faces the Capitol. The lower two-thirds of the plaque bears an inscription in raised, capital letters:

Here Feb 11 1861 Abraham Lincoln on his way to Washington to assume the Presidency in an address said: "I appeal to you to constantly bear in mind that not with politicians not with presidents not with office seekers but with you is the question: Shall the Union and shall the liberties of this country be preserved to the latest generations?"

The base is rough-hewn limestone with the exception of the southeast corner, where stonework adhered to the base is finished in the style of a Corinthian column and capital and gives the base an overall appearance of a single, solid piece. The plaque is affixed to the base with four large bolts on each corner of the inscription. There are no visible foundry marks. The memorial was surveyed in October 1992 as part of the Save Outdoor Sculpture project, in conjunction with the Smithsonian American Art Museum's Inventories of American Painting and Sculpture. The monument's condition at that time was described as well maintained.

== Historical information ==
In 1906 the Commercial Club of Indianapolis, a forerunner to the Indianapolis Chamber of Commerce, hosted a citywide contest for students to design a plaque to commemorate President-elect Lincoln's visit to Indianapolis on 11 February 1861. Lincoln traveled by train from his home in Springfield, Illinois, to Washington, D.C. for his inauguration and first term as president of the United States and stayed overnight in Indianapolis. Marie Stewart, an Indianapolis high school student, submitted the winning design to commemorate the event. Sculptor Rudolf Schwarz executed Stewart's design for the bronze plaque, which was dedicated in 1907.

=== Location history ===
The plaque was originally installed at the Claypool Hotel, which stood on the site of the Bates House, at the corner of Illinois and Washington Streets in Indianapolis. Lincoln stayed at the Bates House during his 1861 visit and spoke to a crowd from one of the hotel balconies. Lincoln's remarks urged Americans to preserve the Union; however, the American Civil War began two months later. The plaque commemorating Lincoln's visit was dedicated at the hotel on 12 February 1907.

After the Claypool Hotel was demolished in 1969, the plaque was installed on a new base designed by Benno Schum and relocated to the west, near the intersection of Washington and Missouri Streets. Lincoln delivered a speech near this location when his arrived in Indianapolis on 11 February 1861; the commemorative plaque contains a quote from Lincoln's response to Indiana Governor Oliver P. Morton's welcoming address. The plaque was rededicated on 12 February 1971.

The monument was removed when construction began on a new state office building in 1988; it was reinstalled in 1991 at nearly the same site after the Indiana Government Center South was completed. The memorial is located on the building's south side, near the intersection of West Washington and South Missouri Streets. The monument is owned and administered by the State of Indiana, Department of Administration.

== Artist ==
Marie Stewart, a student at Indianapolis's Shortridge High School, submitted the winning entry in a citywide contest to design the commemorative plaque. Vienna-born sculptor Rudolf Schwarz, who came to Indianapolis in 1897, created the bronze plaque in 1907. Schwarz is known for crafting the limestone sculptures at the base of the Soldiers and Sailors Monument on Indianapolis's Monument Circle; the bronze statue for the Indiana Governor Oliver P. Morton and Reliefs monument on the east side of the Indiana Statehouse; and sculptures for American Civil War memorials in several Indiana counties. Benno Schum fabricated a new base for the plaque when it was relocated to Indianapolis's West Washington Street in 1971.
