= Vawter =

Vawter may refer to:

== Locations ==
- Vawter, Minnesota, an unincorporated community in Morrison County, Minnesota, US
- Vawter Hall and Old President's House, two historic buildings at Virginia State University in Ettrick, Virginia, US
- J.G. and Elizabeth S. Vawter House, a historic residence in Winterset, Iowa, US
- Page-Vawter House, a historic house in Ansted, Fayette County, West Virginia, US

== People ==
- Vawter (surname), including a list of people with the name
