= Nester House =

Nester House may refer to:

- Nester House (Troy, Indiana), listed on the NRHP in Indiana
- Nester House (Geneva, New York), listed on the NRHP in New York
