= Troy Township, Perry County, Indiana =

Troy Township
- Township
- Location in Perry County
- Coordinates: 37°57′38″N 86°42′53″W
- Country: United States
- State: Indiana
- County: Perry

Government
  - Type: Indiana township

Area
  - Total: 44.31 sq mi (114.8 km^{2})
  - Land: 43.04 sq mi (111.5 km^{2})
  - Water: 1.27 sq mi (3.3 km^{2}) 2.87%
- Elevation: 518 ft (158 m)

Population (2020)
  - Total: 11,961
  - Density: 277.9/sq mi (107.3/km^{2})
- ZIP codes: 47520, 47586, 47588
- GNIS feature ID: 453903

Troy Township is one of seven townships in Perry County, Indiana, United States. As of the 2020 census, its population was 11,961 and it contained 5,845 housing units. It is by far the most populous township in the county, covering almost two thirds of the overall county population.

Historical population
Census	Pop.	Note	%±
1890	6,996		—
1900	7,778		11.2%
1910	8,398		8.0%
1920	8,232		−2.0%
1930	9,524		15.7%
1940	10,632		11.6%
1950	11,559		8.7%
1960	12,362		6.9%
1970	14,077		13.9%
1980	13,921		−1.1%
1990	13,173		−5.4%
2000	12,129		−7.9%
2010	11,965		−1.4%
2020	11,961		0.0%
Source: US Decennial Census

== Geography ==
According to the 2010 census, the township has a total area of 44.31 square miles (114.8 km^{2}), of which 43.04 square miles (111.5 km^{2}) (or 97.13%) is land and 1.27 square miles (3.3 km^{2}) (or 2.87%) is water.

=== Cities, towns, villages ===
- Cannelton
- Tell City
- Troy

=== Unincorporated towns ===
(This list is based on USGS data and may include former settlements.)

=== Cemeteries ===
The township contains these seven cemeteries: Bolin, Cliff, Greenwood, Log Church, Powell, Saint Michaels and Saint Pius.

=== Major highways ===
- Indiana State Road 37
- Indiana State Road 237

=== Lakes ===
- Echo Lake
- Fenn Haven Lake

== School districts ==
Most of the township is in Tell City-Troy Township School Corporation while a piece is in Cannelton City Schools.

== Political districts ==
- State House District 74
- State Senate District 47
