= Vawter (surname) =

Vawter is a surname. Notable people with the surname include:

- Bransford Vawter (1815–1838), American poet
- Bruce Vawter (1921–1986), American Roman Catholic priest and biblical scholar
- Homer Vawter (1894–1958), American politician
- Jason M. Vawter, American musician
- John Terrell Vawter (1830–1916), American businessman-banker
- Ron Vawter (1948–1994), American actor
- Vince Vawter, American novelist
- Will Vawter (1871–1941), American artist
