= Troy, Indiana =

- Town
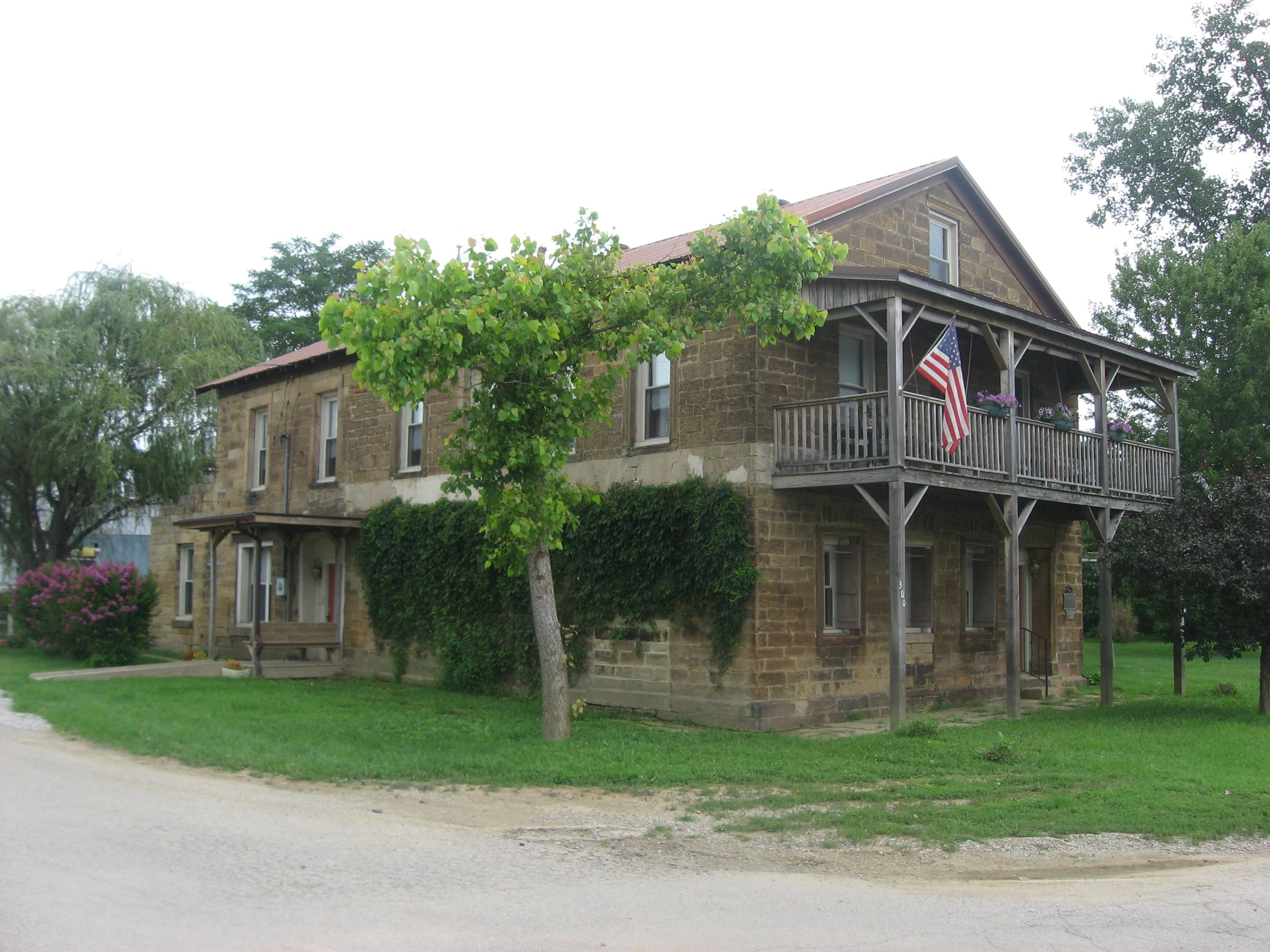
- The Nester House, a historic landmark in the town

- Logo

- Location of Troy in Perry County, Indiana.
- Coordinates: 37°59′58″N 86°47′38″W
- Country: United States
- State: Indiana
- County: Perry
- Township: Troy

Area
  - Total: 1.13 sq mi (2.93 km^{2})
  - Land: 1.13 sq mi (2.93 km^{2})
  - Water: 0 sq mi (0.00 km^{2})
- Elevation: 417 ft (127 m)

Population (2020)
  - Total: 347
  - Density: 306.4/sq mi (118.31/km^{2})
- Time zone: UTC-6 (Central (CST))
  - Summer (DST): UTC-5 (CDT)
- ZIP code: 47588
- Area codes: 812, 930
- FIPS code: 18-76634
- GNIS feature ID: 2397701
- Website: troyindiana.com

Troy is a town in Troy Township, Perry County, Indiana, along the Ohio River near the mouth of the Anderson River. The population was 347 at the 2020 census.

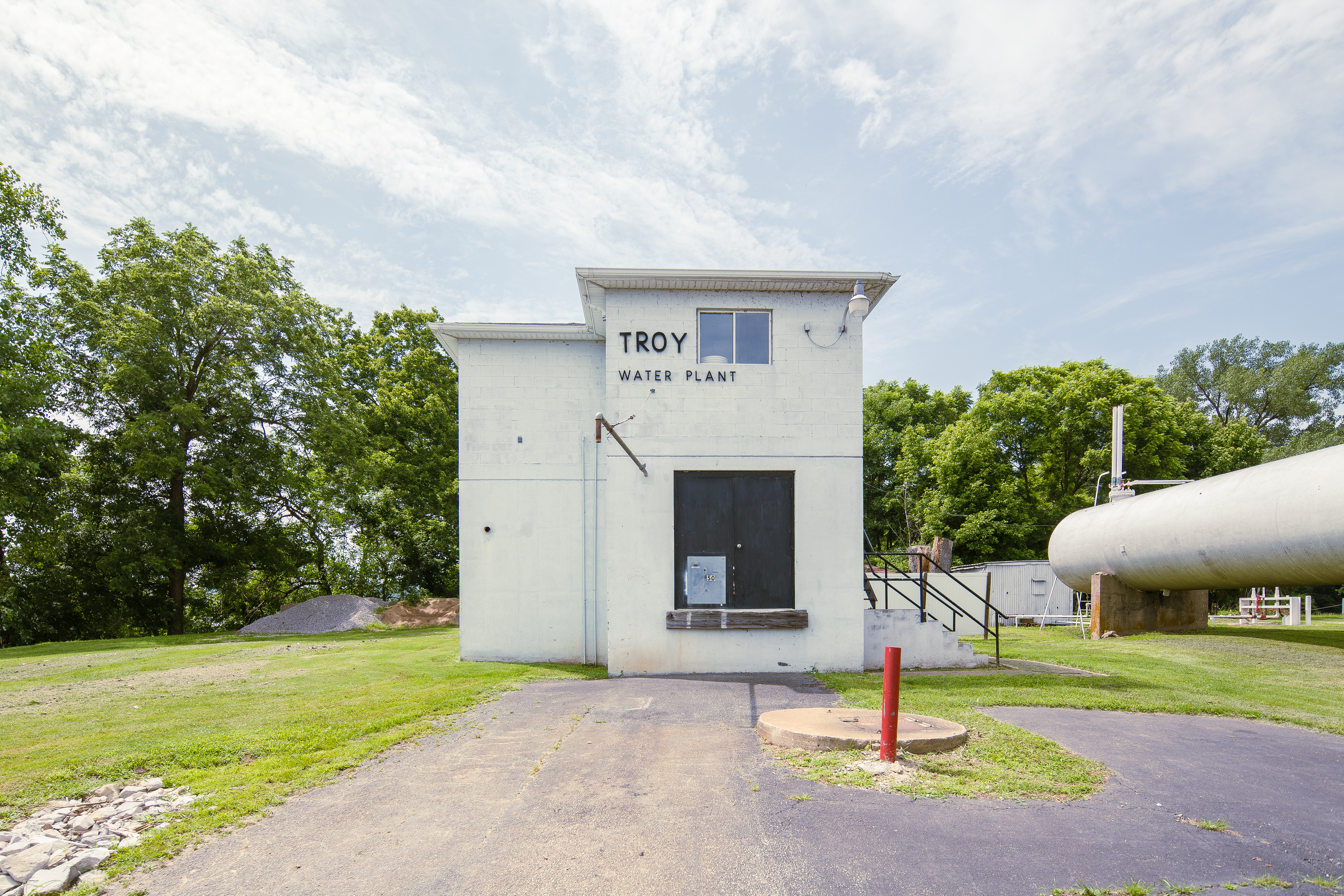
Troy, Indiana

== History ==
Troy was laid out in 1815. Troy was an early county seat of Perry County. A post office has been in operation at Troy since 1818.

Future president Abraham Lincoln worked the ferry across the Ohio River at Troy with his father in his youth.

The Nester House was listed on the National Register of Historic Places in 1990.

== Geography ==
According to the 2010 census, Troy has a total area of 0.32 square miles (0.83 km^{2}), all land.

== Demographics ==
Historical population
Census	Pop.	Note	%±
1860	363		—
1870	480		32.2%
1880	495		3.1%
1890	554		11.9%
1900	599		8.1%
1910	510		−14.9%
1920	454		−11.0%
1930	562		23.8%
1940	599		6.6%
1950	537		−10.4%
1960	528		−1.7%
1970	575		8.9%
1980	550		−4.3%
1990	465		−15.5%
2000	392		−15.7%
2010	385		−1.8%
2020	347		−9.9%
U.S. Decennial Census

=== 2010 census ===
As of the census of 2010, there were 385 people, 163 households, and 103 families living in the town. The population density was 1,203.1 inhabitants per square mile (464.5/km^{2}). There were 190 housing units at an average density of 593.8 per square mile (229.3/km^{2}). The racial makeup of the town was 98.4% White and 1.6% from two or more races. Hispanic or Latino of any race were 1.3% of the population.

There were 163 households, of which 31.3% had children under the age of 18 living with them, 43.6% were married couples living together, 13.5% had a female householder with no husband present, 6.1% had a male householder with no wife present, and 36.8% were non-families. 31.9% of all households were made up of individuals, and 9.8% had someone living alone who was 65 years of age or older. The average household size was 2.36 and the average family size was 2.99.

The median age in the town was 38.8 years. 23.4% of residents were under the age of 18; 8.8% were between the ages of 18 and 24; 23.6% were from 25 to 44; 29.5% were from 45 to 64, and 14.5% were 65 years of age or older. The gender makeup of the town was 46.2% male and 53.8% female.

=== 2000 census ===
As of the census of 2000, there were 392 people, 172 households, and 104 families living in the town. The population density was 1,248.4 inhabitants per square mile (482.0/km^{2}). There were 197 housing units at an average density of 627.4 per square mile (242.2/km^{2}). The racial makeup of the town was 99.23% White, 0.51% Native American, and 0.26% from two or more races. Hispanic or Latino of any race were 1.28% of the population.

There were 172 households, out of which 26.7% had children under the age of 18 living with them, 45.3% were married couples living together, 10.5% had a female householder with no husband present, and 39.0% were non-families. 30.2% of all households were made up of individuals, and 11.0% had someone living alone who was 65 years of age or older. The average household size was 2.24 and the average family size was 2.84.

In the town, the population was spread out, with 21.9% under the age of 18, 8.7% from 18 to 24, 31.4% from 25 to 44, 25.3% from 45 to 64, and 12.8% who were 65 years of age or older. The median age was 38 years. For every 100 females, there were 98.0 males. For every 100 females age 18 and over, there were 94.9 males.

The median income for a household in the town was $30,536, and the median income for a family was $32,708. Males had a median income of $28,333 versus $21,023 for females. The per capita income for the town was $13,891. About 19.2% of families and 19.6% of the population were below the poverty line, including 37.0% of those under age 18 and 7.7% of those age 65 or over.

== Education ==
Troy is in the Tell City-Troy Township School Corporation. The zoned comprehensive high school is Tell City High School.

Previously Troy had its own high school. The school colors were green and old gold, and the mascot was the Trojans. At one point the students were moved to Tell City High School.

== See also ==
- Christ of the Ohio, a public artwork in Troy, Indiana
- List of cities and towns along the Ohio River
