= Christ of the Ohio =

Statue in Troy, Indiana, United States

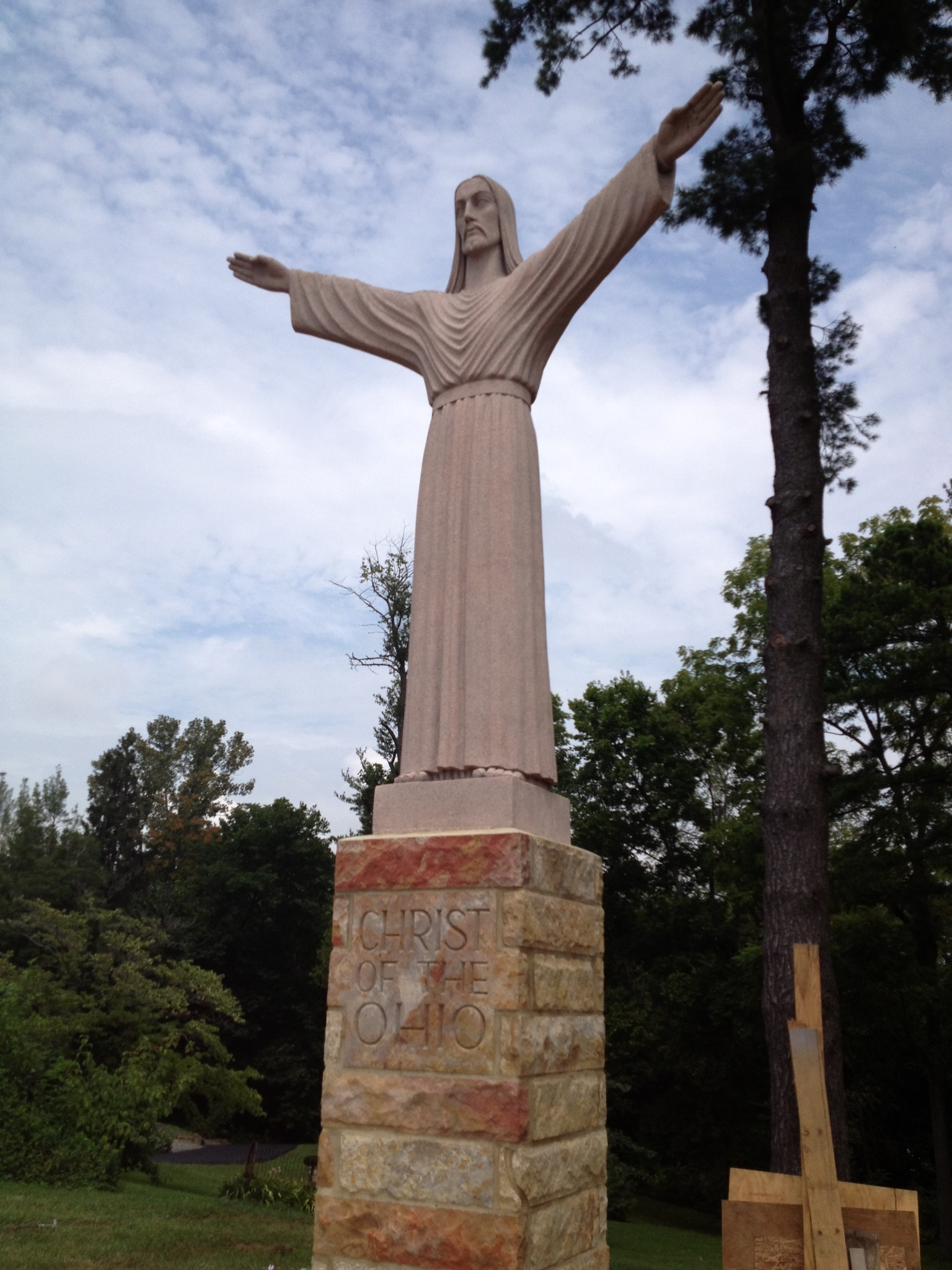
- Artist: Herbert Jogerst
- Year: 1956
- Dimensions: 3.5 m × 2.1 m × 7.0 m (11.4 ft × 7 ft × 23 ft)
- Location: Troy, Indiana, United States; 37°59′31.89″N 86°47′54.11″W
- Owner: Town of Troy

Christ of the Ohio is a statue of Jesus Christ in Troy, Indiana, in the United States. It is located on Fulton Hill, which overlooks the Ohio River.

== Description ==
The statue depicts Jesus Christ standing with his arms stretched upwards towards the sky. He wears a me'īl. He is barefoot and has a beard. It is made of white portland cement mixed with crushed pink stone. The statue is said to weigh 6,300 pounds (lbs). The statue is placed on top of a pedestal, made of stone from Saint Meinrad and cement, with the following engraving on the front:

CHRIST
OF
THE
OHIO
AD
1956
The statue is located on the east side of Troy on the Ohio Riverfront. It resides near a bend in the river and has been used as a beacon for boats since its dedication. It can be seen from Indiana State Road 66. It resides 75 feet above the road.

== Herbert Jogerst ==
Herbert Jogerst was a German prisoner of war during World War II. He was incarcerated in Morganfield, Kentucky, at Camp Breckenridge in 1943. He worked on sculptures as a prisoner and impressed the camp chaplain, Peter Behrman, who was a priest at the St. Meinrad Archabbey. Jogerst returned to Germany in 1948 and struggled to find work as an artist. He contacted Behrman for assistance and St. Meinrad Archabbey commissioned Jogurst to create some sculptures. Jogerst died in 1993.

== History ==
While working on commissioned works for St. Meinrad, Jogerst met Dr. Nicholas A. James, while James was visiting the Archabbey. James commissioned Jogerst to create the statue for his summer home. The home, which is known as "Grandma's House," was located on the banks of the Ohio River. The work was dedicated on May 1, 1957. Grandma's House was eventually sold and the statue was purchased by the town of Troy.

== Condition ==
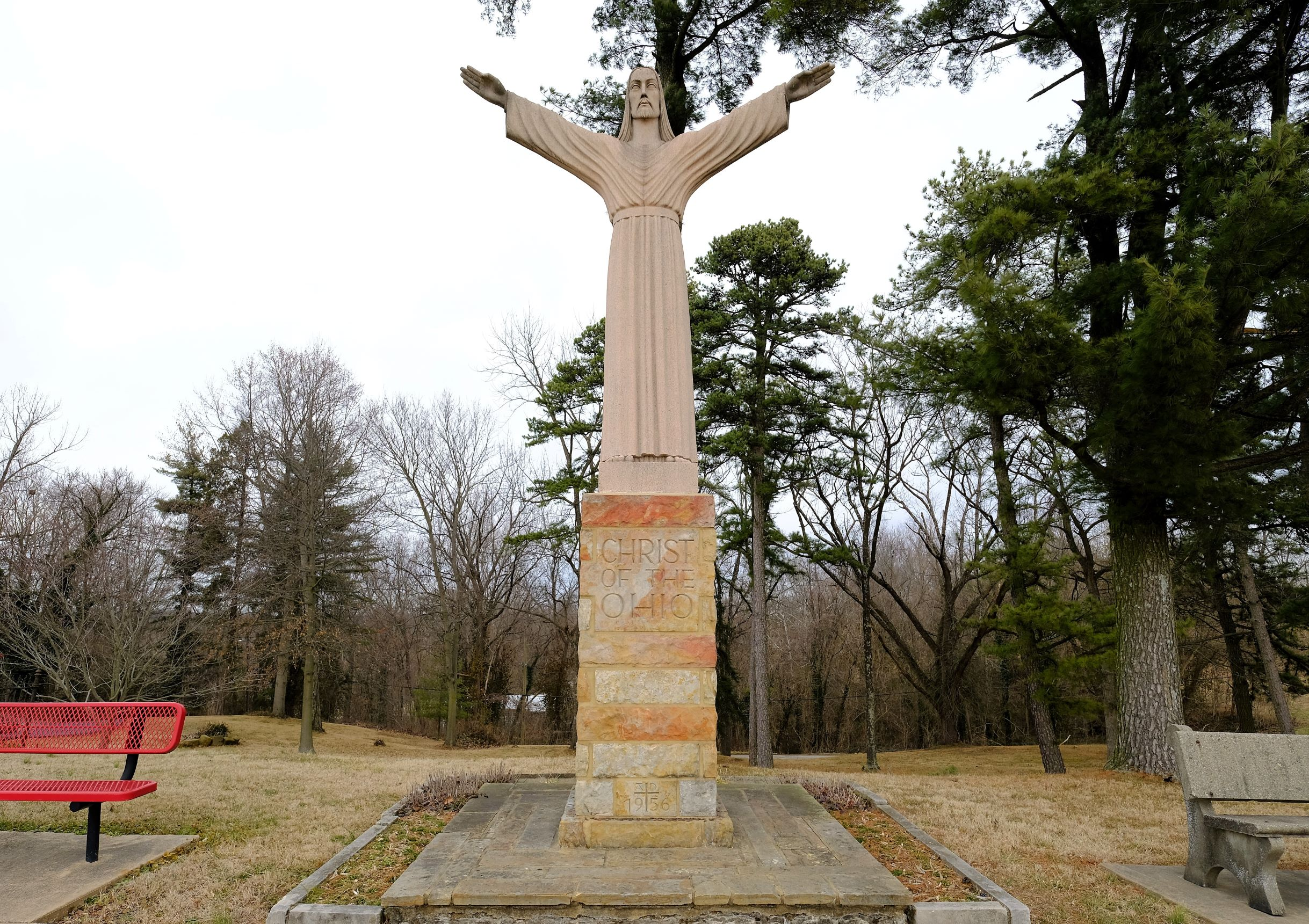

Christ of the Ohio was surveyed by the Smithsonian Institution's Save Outdoor Sculpture! survey in 1993 and was described as being "well maintained" by surveyors.

== See also ==
- List of statues of Jesus
