= Morgan Monument (Decatur) =

Artwork by Tom Ellinger

- Artist: Tom Ellinger
- Year: 1989
- Type: Black & Pink Granite
- Dimensions: 147.10 cm × 65 cm × 472.26 cm (57.912 in × 25.4 in × 185.928 in)
- Location: Decatur, Indiana; 40.8299°N 84.9456°W
- Owner: Decatur Cemetery

Morgan Monument is a public artwork by American artist Tom Ellinger, located at Decatur Cemetery in Decatur, Indiana, United States. This sculpture sits at the site of the Morgan Family Plot. Morgan Monument was originally surveyed as part of the Smithsonian's Save Outdoor Sculpture! survey in 1993.

== Description ==
This gravestone is a Semi-trailer truck made of black granite. Inside the trucks trailer is a set of logs made of pink granite. The truck has all the details of a "real" truck – the cab has a relief of a driver inside, and wipers, handrails and exhaust pipes as well. It is unsigned by the artist.

The sculpture sits upon a rectangular base made of granite and has a tapered front. (approx. 9 in. x 7 ft. 7 in. x 1 ft. 4 in.)

The logs have an inscription stating on the front of the base: MORGAN

The left side of the logs inscription states:

JOHN W.
JUNE 1941–

The center logs are inscribed with:

JACQUELINE
NOV 15, 1942

== Condition ==
This sculpture was surveyed in 1993 for its condition and was described as "well maintained."
