= Miami Indian (sculpture) =

Public artwork in Montpelier, Indiana

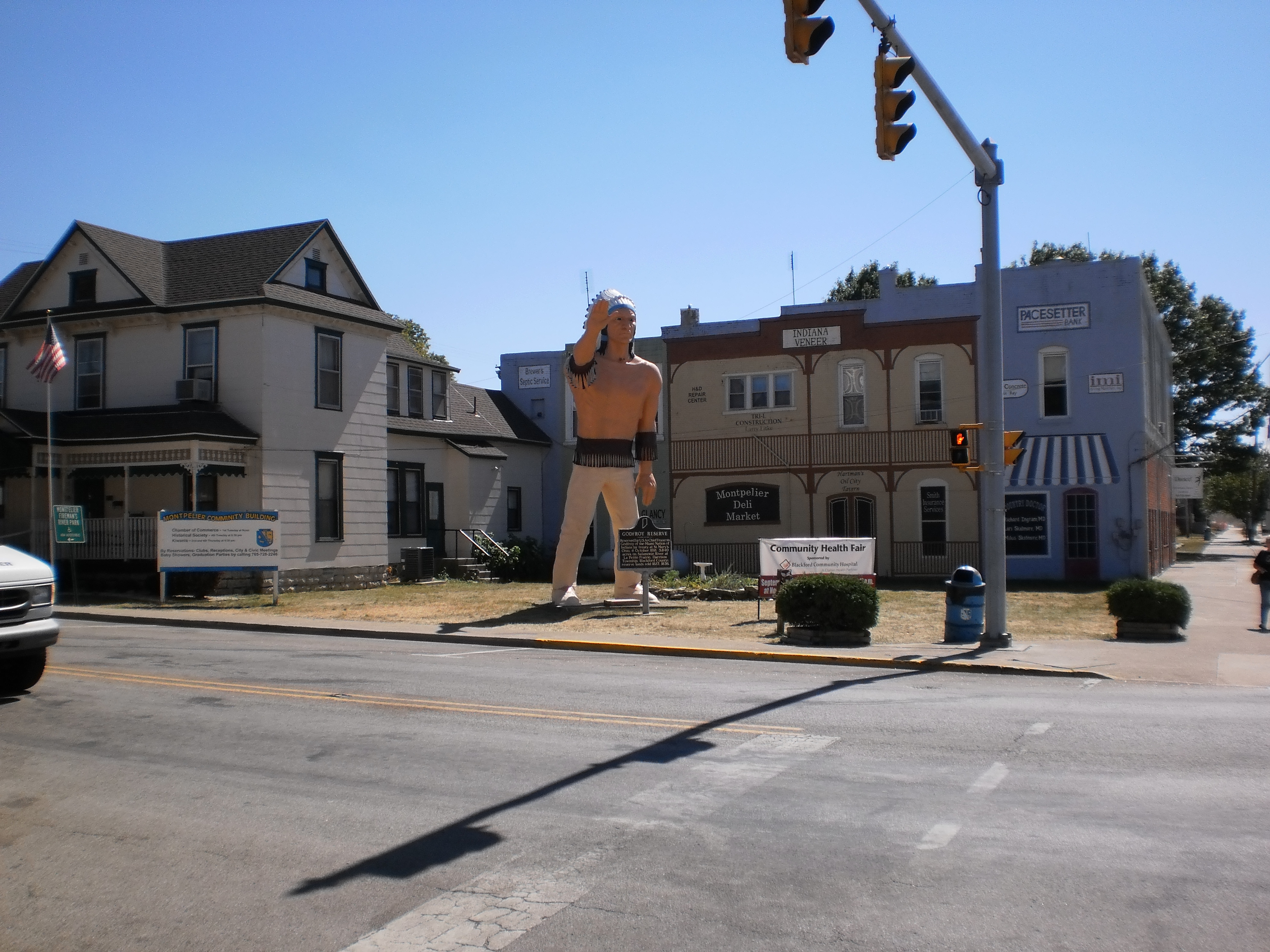
- Artist: Unknown
- Year: 1984
- Type: Fiberglass, concrete, granite
- Dimensions: 760 cm × 216 cm × 140 cm (300 in × 85.2 in × 55.2 in)
- Location: Montpelier Community Building; Montpelier, Indiana, United States; 40°33′14.27″N 85°16′39.31″W
- Owner: City of Montpelier

The Miami Indian is a work of public art located in Montpelier, Indiana in the United States. The piece depicts a stereotypical image of Native American man. The piece is best known for its appearance in the introductory montage of the American television program, Parks and Recreation.

== Description ==
The sculpture, which stands 25 feet tall, is made of fiberglass that is painted. The sculpture depicts a Plains Indian man. His proper right arm is lifted in the air with his hand reaching outward. He wears a pair of white pants, with brown fringe around his waist. Both arms have fringed brown armbands around them. He wears a pair of white shoes. On his head is a war bonnet, it is blue and white. He has black hair in braids, with a blue band on each braid, that comes down along both cheekbones. On his proper right leg, just above the knee, is painted "INTERNATIONAL FIBERGLASS, VENICE".

A plaque, made of granite, is in front of the state and it reads:

INDIAN STATUE GIVEN TO THE CITY OF MONTPELIER, JANUARY 1984
BY LARRY P. GODFROY, CHIEF, MIAMI INDIANS

== Acquisition ==
The piece was originally installed at a Pontiac dealer, in the 1960s, which was located in Indianapolis, Indiana. The sculpture was supposed to represent Chief Pontiac. It was moved to a museum in Bismarck, North Dakota in the 1970s. Eventually, the piece was moved back to Indiana, and to Eagle Creek Park, where a museum resided. It sat outside the entrance of a Native American museum. Eventually, the statue was given to Chief Larry Godfroy of the Miami people. The piece is now located in downtown Montpelier, where it was dedicated in January, 1984. In 1985, the sculpture was donated by Chief Godfroy to the city of Montpelier, which resided near ancestral lands of the Miami.

== Other information ==
In front of the statue is an Indiana historical marker referencing the history of the Miami people in the region.

== Condition ==
In 1993, the sculpture was evaluated by the Save Outdoor Sculpture! surveyors. The piece was described as needing treatment.
