= It Must Be a Good Book =

It must be a good book
- Artist: Gregory Mendez
- Year: 2011
- Type: Bronze
- Location: Adams Public Library; Decatur, Indiana, United States; 40°49′43″N 84°55′30″W
- Owner: Adams Public Library

It must be a good book is a sculpture by Gregory Mendez. It is located outside of the Adams Public Library in Decatur, Indiana, in the United States.

== Description ==
It Must Be a Good Book is made of bronze. The work features two figures, a young boy and girl. The boy sits on the base of work, with his hands behind his back, propping him upwards. His left leg is arched upwards, and underneath it is his right leg, which stretches out on the ground. He wears a t-shirt, shorts, and sneakers. On his head he wears a baseball hat and his head is lifted upwards. He looks up at a young girl, who is wearing a white dress and standing. The bronze is painted in a white color. She is reading a book, which is held in her left hand. Her face is tilted upwards, looking at it. Her right hand is outstretched behind her, in a curved motion, as if she is reciting a book. She stands straight up, with her right leg turned slightly to the right and stretched slightly behind her. The piece sits on a concrete block.

== Acquisition ==
The piece was commissioned in 2011 by the Adams Public Library after Greg Mendez had an exhibition of his work at the Decatur library. The piece was installed in October 2011.

== Information ==
The work is a tribute to Dianne Linn, who was a librarian for the North Adams Community School System. She was a volunteer at the library. Linn died in 2009. The piece is featured on the Decatur Sculpture Tour. The tour has described the work as being a "concrete example of the positive effects an outside sculpture creates in a downtown setting." The work was the catalyst for the creation of the public art tour.
