= John Terrell Vawter =

American businessman

- Born: Franklin, Indiana
- Children: John Terrell Vawter Jr., David, Jesse, John and Smith Vawter.

John Terrell Vawter was an American businessman-banker from Franklin, Johnson County, Indiana, United States. He was the half-uncle of an architect of the same name, Major John Terrell Vawter.

Vawter donated the Civil War memorial monument, known as the Vawter Memorial (featuring a sculpture by Rudolph Schwarz) in the Johnson County Courthouse square in Franklin, Indiana.

Interested in real estate, he was first the builder on the south shore of Lake Wawasee naming his property Vawter Park Village. He was the first proprietor of Vawter Park Hotel located there. Having lived in Franklin for almost 60 years, Vawter discontinued his business interests (including Vawter Drugs, Franklin Gas Co., and meat packing company Wheat, Vawter & Co.) in Franklin and moved to his land holdings at Vawter Park in 1886.

Vawter Park Village was plotted in 1887 and the hotel followed. A number of vacation cottages were constructed southeast of the hotel by prominent citizens, one of which was Ovid Butler.

He enjoyed sailing his steam yacht, "Giselle", on Wawasee. It was a 70-foot (21 m) screw propeller craft with no sail rigging. In September, he would invite the children of the village for a cruise, providing them with treats of candy.

Children were: John Terrell Vawter Jr., David, Jesse, John, Smith Vawter.
