= Nester House (Troy, Indiana) =

- U.S. National Register of Historic Places
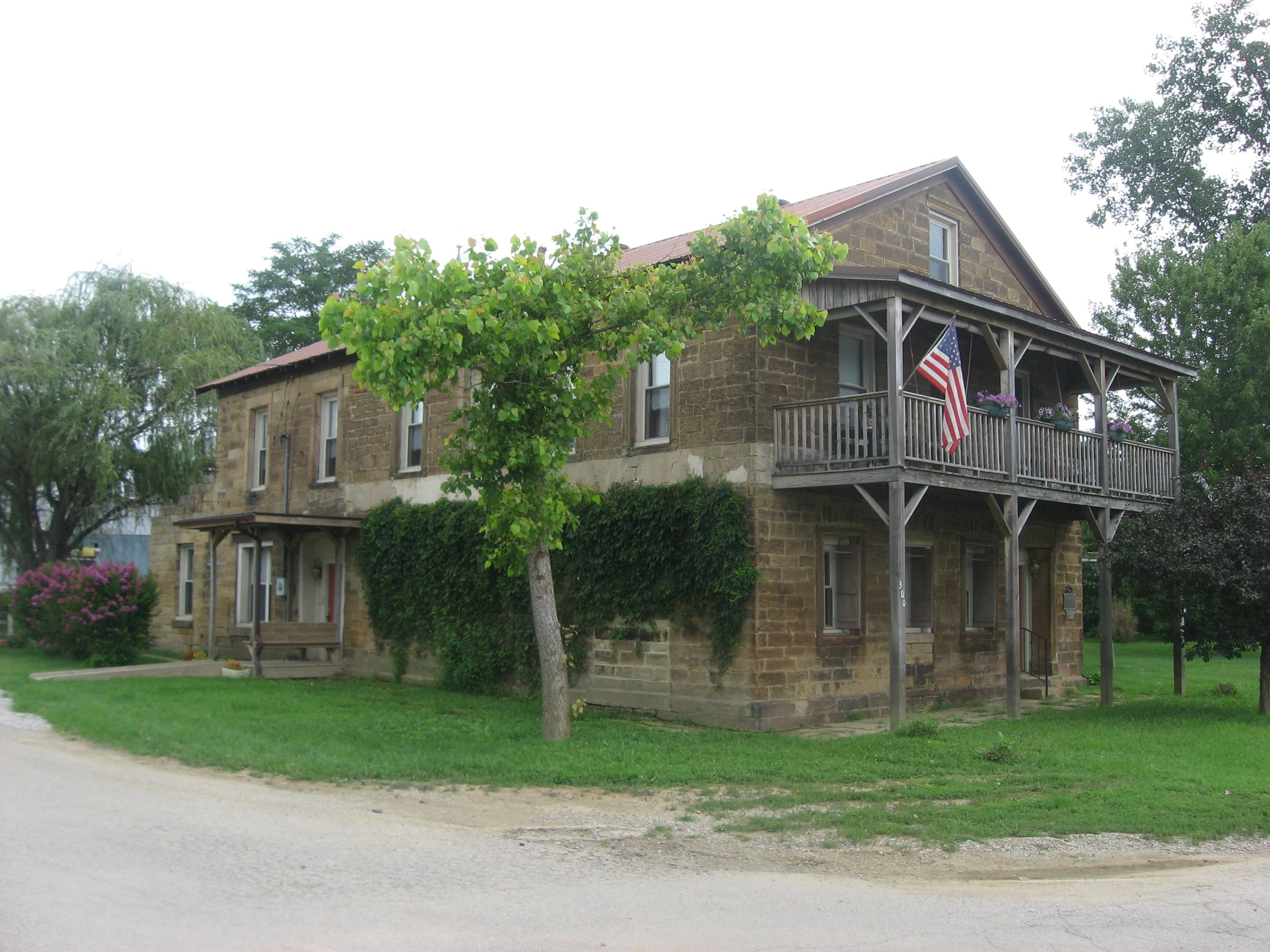
- Nester House, July 2011

- Location within Indiana Location within the United States
- Location: 300 Water St., Troy, Indiana
- Coordinates: 37°59′40″N 86°48′19″W
- Area: less than one acre
- Built: c. 1863
- Architect: Bengle, J.J.
- NRHP reference No.: 90001486
- Added to NRHP: October 11, 1990

Nester House, also known as the Family Grocerie, Union Hotel, and Riverplace, is a historic hotel located at Troy, Indiana. It was built about 1863, and is a 2 1/2-story, sandstone block building, with a late 1870s or mid 1880s rear addition. It features a two tiered, full facade porch. Also on the property is a contributing one story, rectangular brick building that is believed to have been a bathhouse for the hotel. The building housed a hotel that served salesmen and other river travelers of late-19th and early-20th century. It ceased to be used as a hotel in the 1930s.

It was listed on the National Register of Historic Places in 1990.
