= The Blessed Mother =

Coordinates: 40°49′47.7″N 84°55′37.8″W

- Artist: Gregory Mendez; Neil Wiffill
- Year: 2013
- Type: Steel; Scagliola
- Location: St. Mary of the Assumption Catholic Church; Decatur, Indiana, United States
- Owner: Roman Catholic Diocese of Fort Wayne-South Bend

The Blessed Mother is a work of public art by Gregory Mendez and Neil Wiffill. The sculpture, which depicts Mary, is located at St. Mary of the Assumption Catholic Church in Decatur, Indiana in the United States.

== Description ==
The sculpture depicts Mary during her assumption into heaven. She is standing straight upwards, with her chest tilted to the proper left. Her arms are extended, with her proper left arm pointed downward diagonal and her proper right arm pointing upwards diagonal. Her eyes are closed and her head is slightly tilted forward. Mary is shown to wear a blue, white, and light blue robe, which falls all the way to the ground, covering her feet and most of her arms. Three angels are hidden in the robe. Her head is covered by the top of the robe, which has a marbled pale orange-green color. She wears a white shawl, which is draped over both arms and falls almost to the ground. She has white skin and gold speckling is seen throughout the piece. There are three long-stem roses made of metal lying on the ground in front of her. They are affixed to a piece of metal.

Originally, the piece was going to be made of cement. The artists changed their minds in order to experiment, and the sculpture was made of scagliola with steel reinforcement. The artists chose to use scagliola to give the sculpture an appearance of being made of marble. The sculpture stands bolted to a covered platform structure, which was completed within four days, and is made of steel with a rubber roof. The sculpture, in total, weighs 700 pounds.

== Acquisition ==
The piece was commissioned, in June 2012, by the St. Mary of the Assumption Catholic Church's Mary's Garden committee, who were in charge of developing a new garden on the church grounds. They asked Gregory Mendez to create it, and he invited Neil Wiffill, whom he had worked with before, to collaborate. The Blessed Mother was completed at Wiffill's studio, 20 miles away, and moved to the church. The sculpture was dedicated on September 8, 2013, the birthday of Mary. It is located in the Mary Garden at the church.

== Other information ==
Gregory Mendez and Neil Wiffill worked together to create the piece. The piece took almost one year to complete. They worked 14-hour days during the last four months before finalizing the piece, in order to make the dedication date. They created seven models before deciding on the final version. The artists debated how to depict Mary, either as a modern-day woman or in more traditional clothing. They also discussed extensively on how her body would be positions. In the end piece, the artists aimed to depict a "alive and real" person through the sculpture. She is described as "shapely and modern in appearance," by the artists.

The platform, that the sculpture is affixed to, was created by Elton Bishop. It is described as a "modern-day grotto". The three long-stemmed roses, which lie at the sculptures feet, are meant to suggest that visitors can place flowers of their own in Mary's honor. They are also a tribute to the mothers of the artists. The sculpture is the largest collaboration that the two sculptors have created together, to date.

== Condition ==
Due to the fragility of scagliola, which is rarely used for outdoor sculpture, the sculpture resides on a covered platform. Before installation, the piece was given four coats of sealant for protection.
