= Rudolf Schwarz (sculptor) =

American sculptor

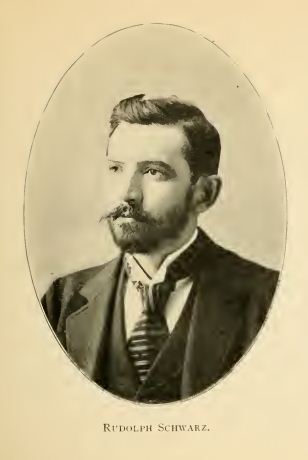
- Born: 1866; Vienna, Austria
- Died: 1912 (aged 45–46); Indianapolis, Indiana
- Known for: Sculpture

Rudolf Schwarz (June 1866 – 14 April 1912), sometimes spelled Rudolph Schwarz, was an Austrian-born American sculptor. He emigrated to Indianapolis in December 1897 to help complete the Soldiers' and Sailors' Monument in Indianapolis, Indiana, which was designed by German architect Bruno Schmitz. He was invited to work on the project by Karl Bitter, with whom he had worked in Austria.

== Training ==
In Vienna, Schwarz attended the Real-Schule, similar to America's high school, for eight years. Afterward, he entered the Imperial Academy of Arts in Vienna, where his work was recognized and where he received many prizes. Karl Bitter met him at that Academy and introduced him to stone-carving.

Bitter describes Schwarz in their younger days:

"Schwarz attracted me very much. His manly bearing, his fondness for athletic exercise, his straightforwardness, and particularly his quick and vivid mind, made him one of the most promising pupils of the Academy. To his influence during these years I owe a great deal, especially in physical development. He supplied our class with dumbbells, which became our favorite exercise. He was the kind of young man in every respect that I should like my son to be; for with his coming a new ideal, striving, entered the hearts of the other students.", whom he had known in Austria.

In 1887 when the competition for the Soldiers and Sailors Monument began, Bruno Schmitz, who was first commissioned for the work realized he needed to bring Schwarz to Indianapolis. Schmitz located him in the ateliers of Berlin and both went to Indianapolis to work on the monument.

== Indianapolis years ==
He lived a simple life, almost secluded, and was not known among the public. He created a studio on East Raymond Street on the south side of Indianapolis. His studio was more or less a shed that was below ground. He had an assistant who was also his model who would dress in costumes for the figures that Schwarz would be designing. Schwarz made his creations using the lost wax casting process.

About working as an artist, Schwarz says: "It requires some nerve for a young man to choose art as a career. An artist sometimes does not know how to meet the problems that come up. He must have the greatest conceivable amount of patience if he wishes to achieve success. Art as well as any other work takes perseverance.", For the last seven years of his life, Schwarz created and directed a class in sculpture from 1905 to 1912 at the John Herron Art School, now known as Herron School of Art and Design.

Rudolf Schwarz died on April 14, 1912, at the age of forty-seven.

== Legacy ==
Schwarz is known from at least 30 sculptural works throughout the state of Indiana, many of which are War Memorials.

=== Selected works ===
- Indiana Soldiers' and Sailors' Monument (1897-1902), Monument Circle, Indianapolis, Indiana, Bruno Schmitz, architect. Nikolaus Geiger and George Brewster modeled the bronze architectural sculpture. Brewster also modeled the bronze figure of Victory atop the monument.
  - War, limestone, designed by Frederick MacMonnies, carved by Schwarz.
  - Peace, limestone, designed by Frederick MacMonnies, carved by Schwarz.
  - The Dying Soldier, limestone.
  - The Return Home, limestone.
  - Artilleryman, limestone.
  - Sailor, limestone.
  - Infantryman, limestone.
  - Cavalryman, limestone.
- Architectural sculpture, South Side Turnverein Hall (1899-1900), Indianapolis, Indiana.
- Soldiers' and Sailors' Monument (1902–03), St. Joseph County Courthouse, South Bend, Indiana.
- Hazen S. Pingree (1903), Grand Circus Park, Detroit, Michigan.
- Forrest Monument (1904), Crown Hill Cemetery, Indianapolis, Indiana.
- Vawter Memorial (1905), Johnson County Courthouse, Franklin, Indiana.
- Soldiers' Monument (1905–06), Trigon Park, Le Roy, New York.
- Soldiers' and Sailors' Monument (1906), Montgomery County Courthouse, Crawfordsville, Indiana.
- Portrait Medallions of Rubens, da Vinci, Michaelangelo, Velasquez (1906), Herron School of Art and Design, Indianapolis, Indiana. Since 2006, this building has been occupied by Herron High School, a charter school for the arts.
- Lincoln Plaque (1907), Washington & Missouri Streets, Indianapolis, Indiana.
- Oliver P. Morton and Reliefs (1907), in front of the Indiana State Capitol, Indianapolis, Indiana.
- Soldiers' and Sailors' Monument (1907–08), Posey County Courthouse, Mount Vernon, Indiana, F. M. Young, architect.
- Soldiers' and Sailors' Monument (1909–10), Vigo County Courthouse, Terre Haute, Indiana.
- Soldiers' and Sailors' Monument (1911–12), Gibson County Courthouse, Princeton, Indiana.
- Soldiers' and Sailors' Monument (1913–14), Knox County Courthouse, Vincennes, Indiana.
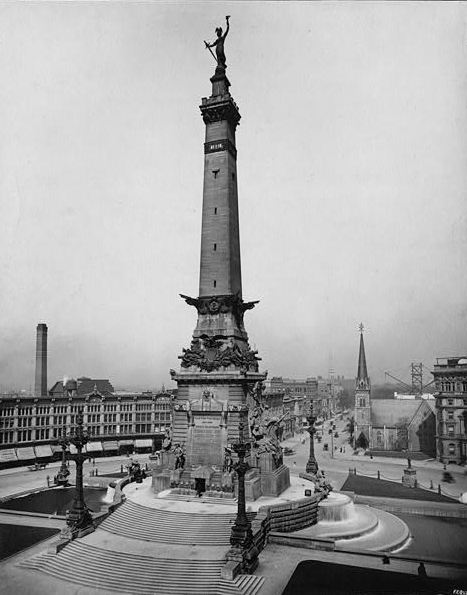
Indiana Soldiers' and Sailors' Monument (1897-1902), Indianapolis, Indiana, in 1898.

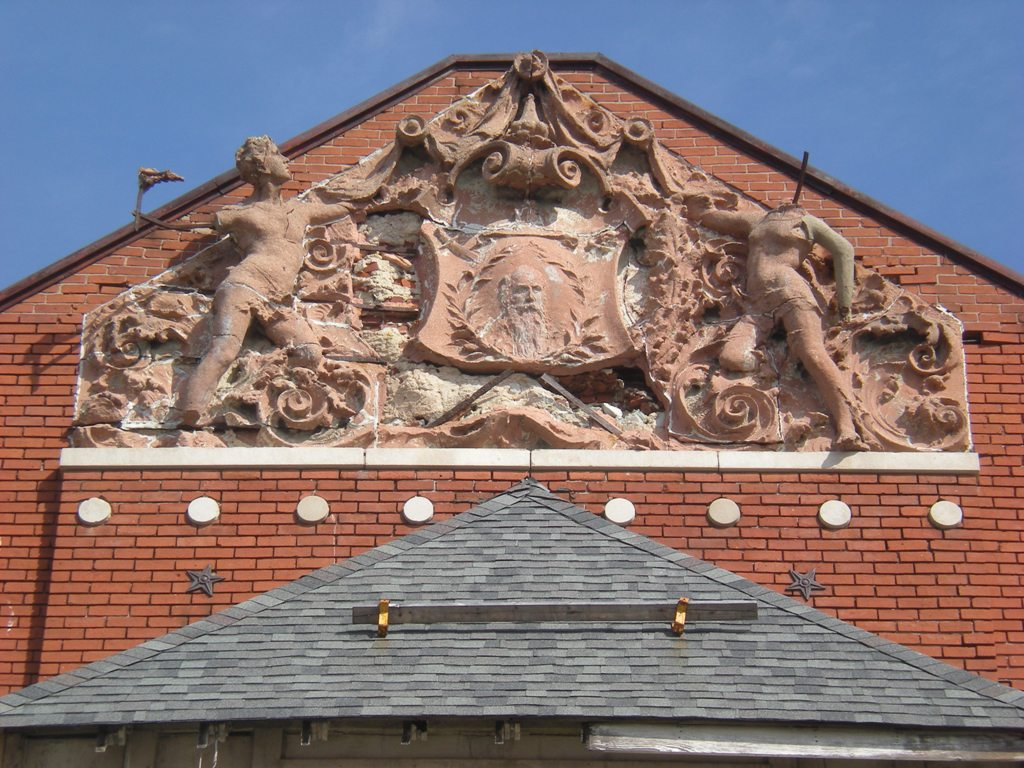
Sculpture group on west gable of Turnverein Building (1899-1900), Indianapolis, Indiana.

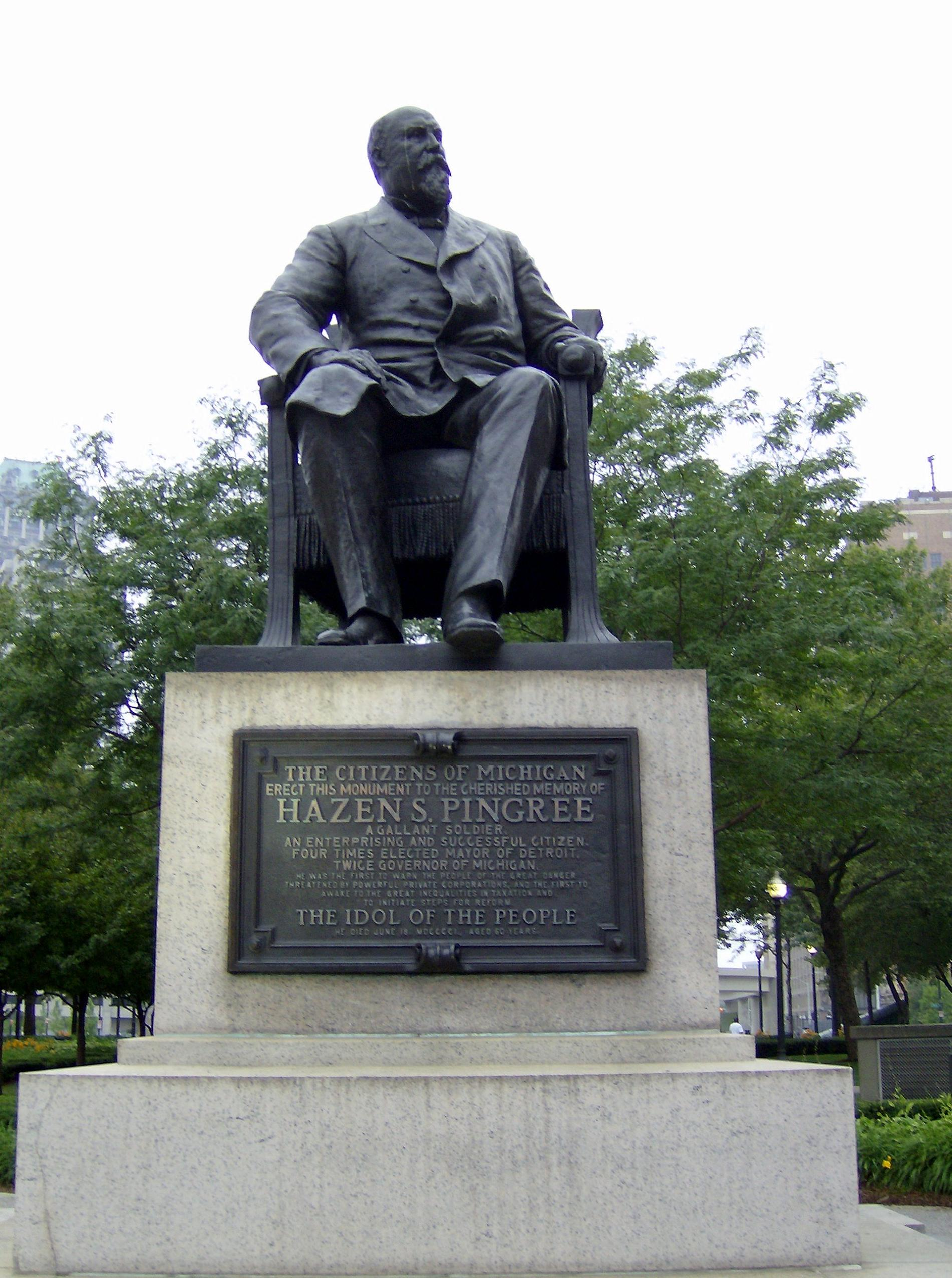
Hazen S. Pingree (1903), Grand Circus Park, Detroit, Michigan.

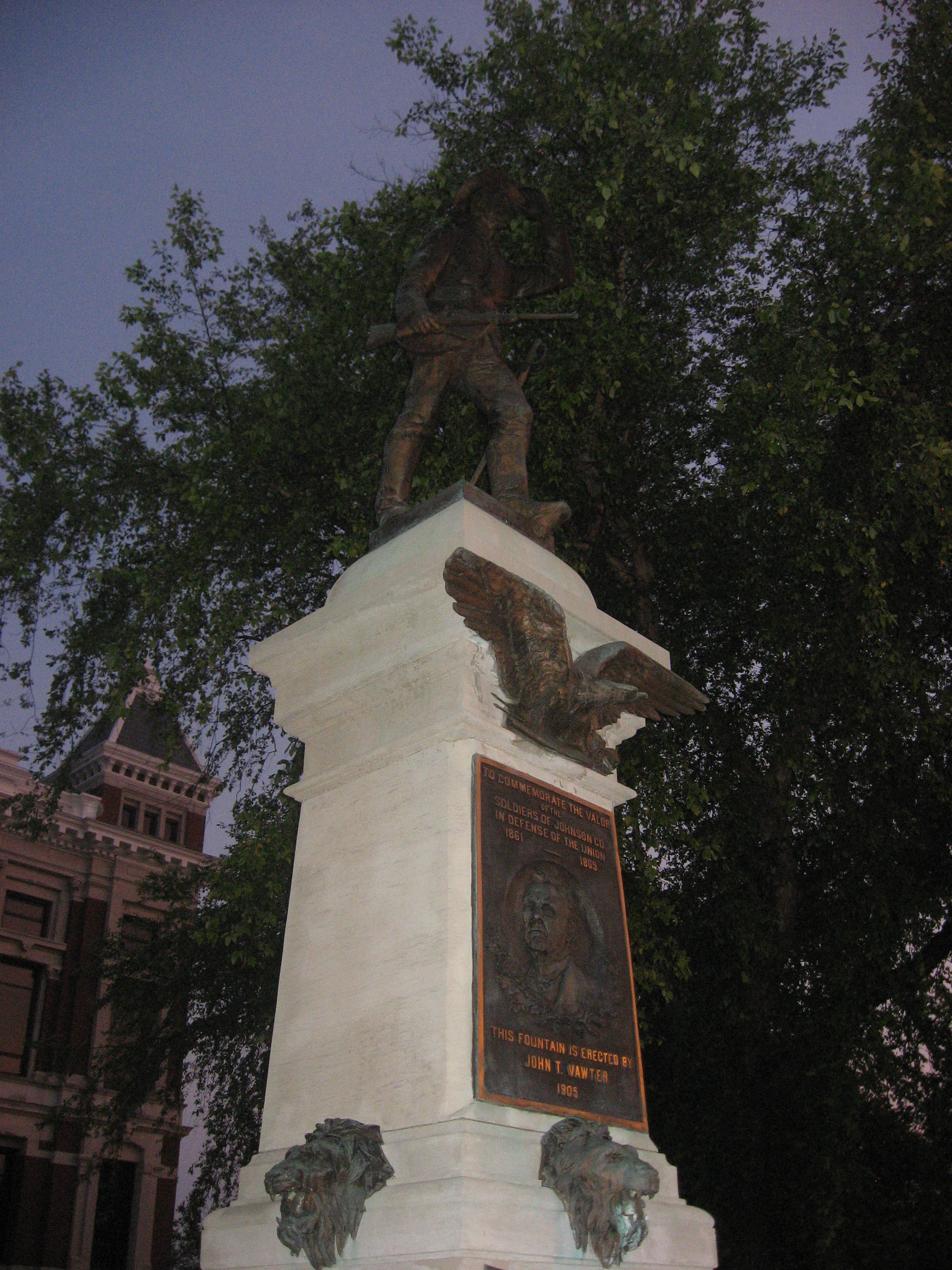
Vawter Memorial (1905), Johnson County Courthouse, Franklin, Indiana.

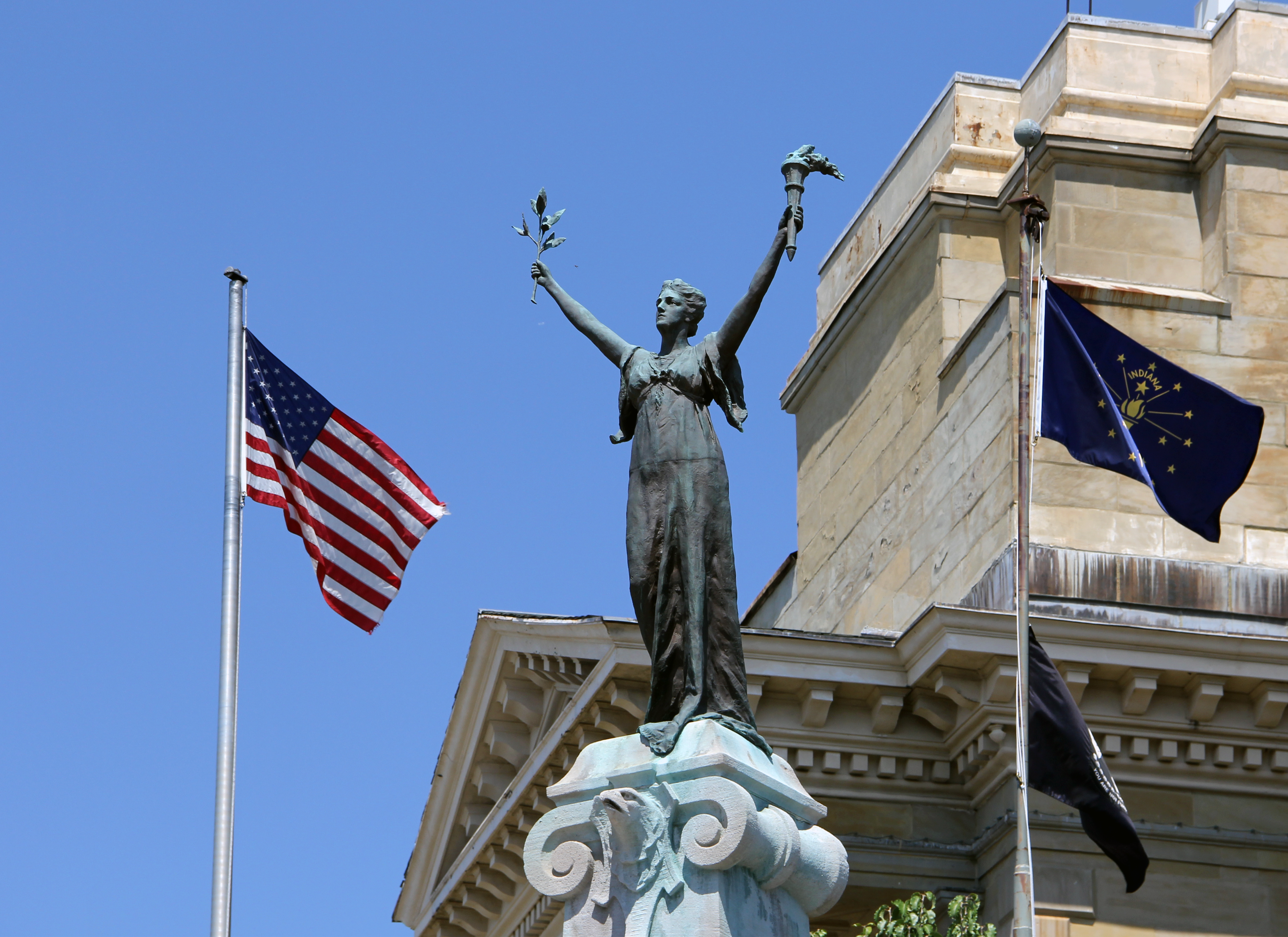
Soldiers' and Sailors' Monument (1906), Crawfordsville, Indiana.

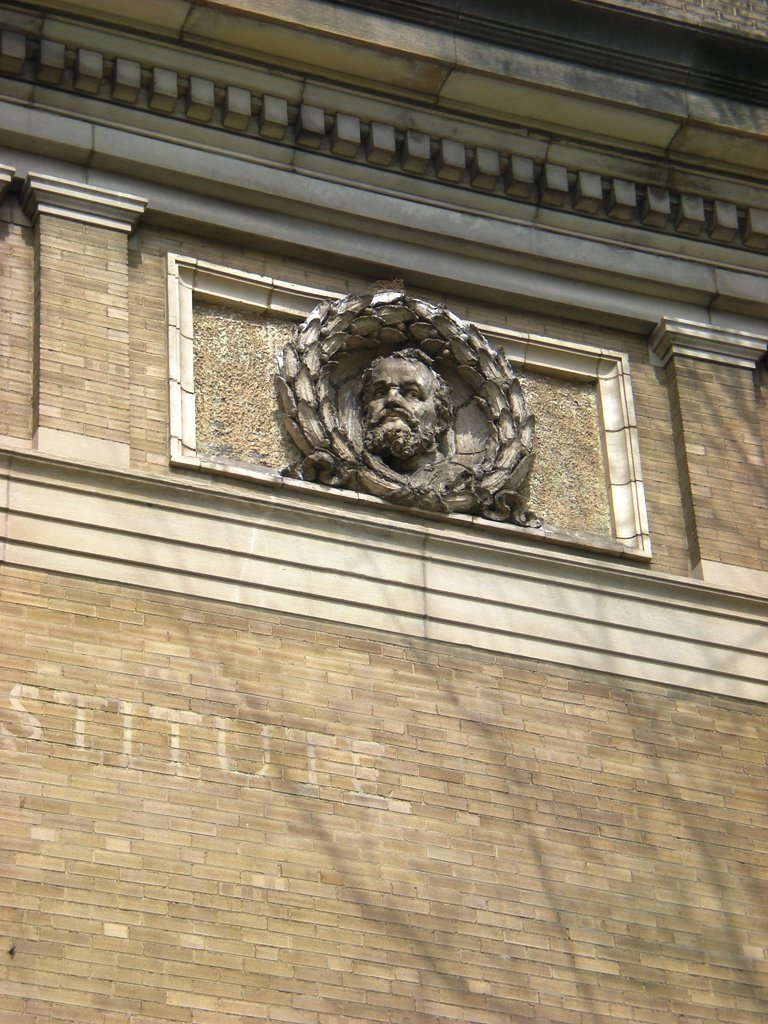
Portrait medallion (1906), Herron High School, Indianapolis, Indiana.

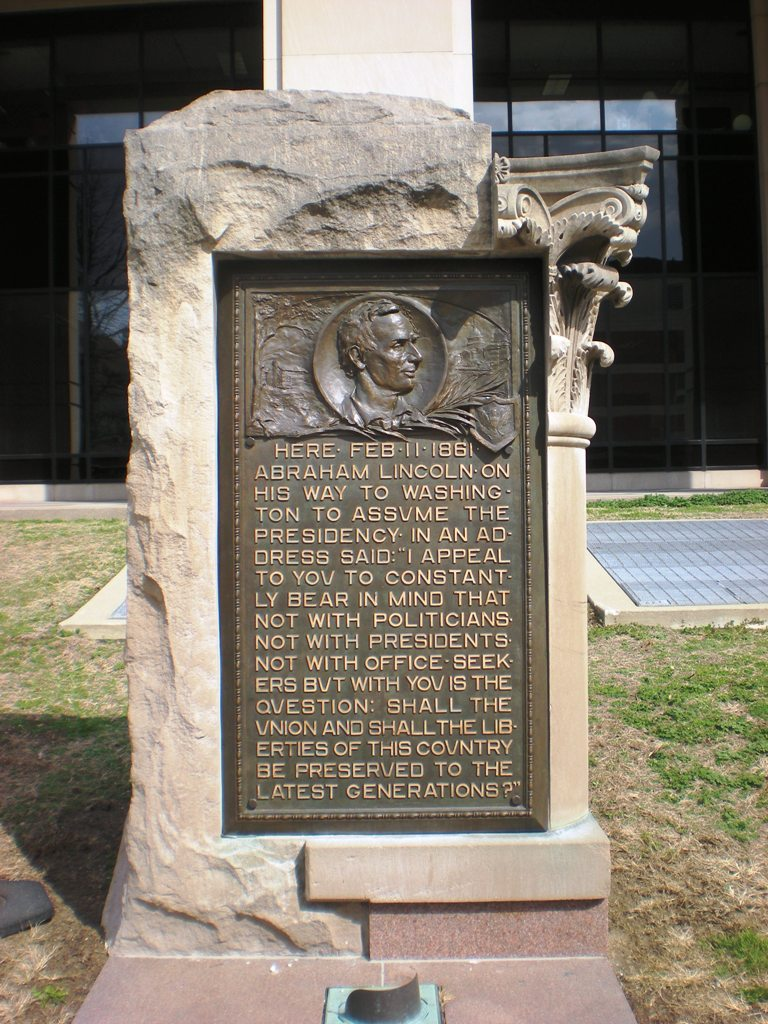
Lincoln Plaque (1907), Indianapolis, Indiana.

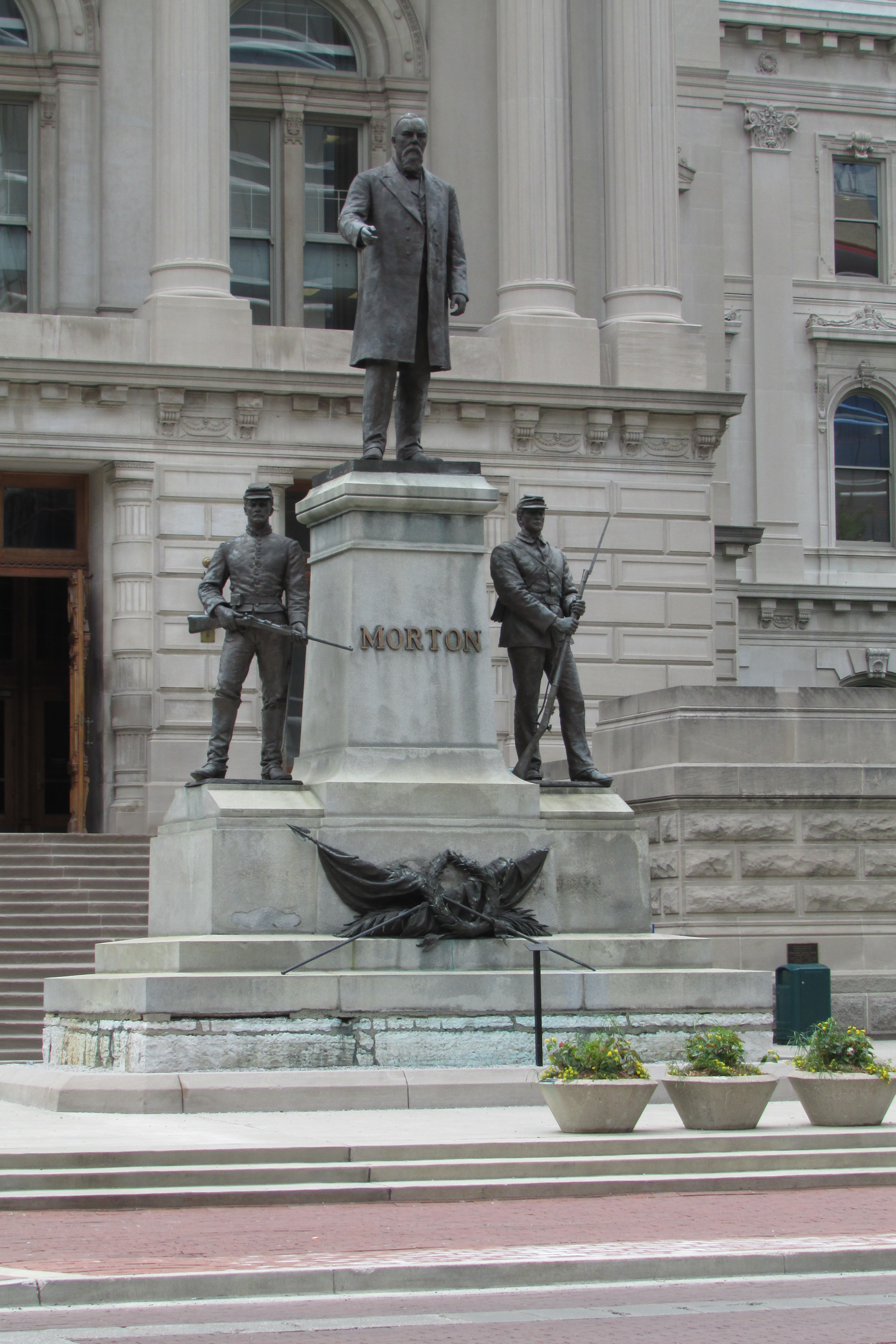
Oliver P. Morton and Reliefs at the Indiana State House in Indianapolis.
