= George Washington (disambiguation) =

George Washington (1732–1799) was a Founding Father of the United States and served as its the first president.

George Washington may also refer to:

== Arts and entertainment ==
=== Statues ===
- George Washington (Bailly), an 1869 statue at Independence Hall, Philadelphia
- George Washington (Canova), an 1820 marble statue by Antonio Canova
- George Washington (Causici), an 1829 marble statue by Enrico Causici
- George Washington (Ceracchi), a 1795 marble bust by Giuseppe Ceracchi
- George Washington (Chantrey), an 1826 marble statue by Sir Francis Chantrey
- George Washington (Fairbanks), a 1975 outdoor bronze sculpture at George Washington University, Washington, D.C.
- George Washington (Greenough), an 1840 statue by Horatio Greenough
- George Washington (Houdon), a 1788-1791/1792 life-size statue by Jean-Antoine Houdon in Richmond, Virginia
- George Washington (Pettrich), an 1841 plaster statue by Ferdinand Pettrich
- George Washington (Rush), an 1815 wooden statue by William Rush
- George Washington (copy of bust by Houdon), a 1932 public artwork in Indianapolis, Indiana
- Lieutenant General George Washington (statue), an 1860 equestrian statue by Clark Mills

=== Other arts and entertainment ===
- George Washington (Trumbull), a 1780 portrait by John Trumbull
- George Washington (Trumbull, 1790), a 1790 portrait by John Trumbull
- George Washington (film), a 2000 drama
- George Washington (miniseries), a 1984 television miniseries
- George Washington (book), a children's book by Genevieve Foster
- George Washington, one of the names of the frog from the animated miniseries Over the Garden Wall
- George Washington (Stuart, Williamstown), an 1803 painting by Gilbert Stuart

== Education ==
- George Washington University, a private university in Washington, D.C.
  - George Washington Revolutionaries, the athletic program of George Washington University
- George Washington School (disambiguation)
- George Washington High School (disambiguation)
- George Washington Middle School (disambiguation)
- George Washington Elementary School (disambiguation)

== People ==
- George Washington (name), a list of various people bearing the name
- George Washington Browne, Scottish architect (1853–1939)
- George Washington Carver, American botanist and inventor (1864-1943)
- George Washington Morse, American missionaries and inventor (1816–1909)
- Prince George Washington of Siam (Wichaichan) (1838–1885)
- George Washington Tryon, American malacologist (1838–1888)

== Ships ==
- USS George Washington, four US Navy ships
- SS George Washington, a German ocean liner
- George Washington (steamboat)

== Transportation ==
- George Washington Bridge, a suspension bridge connecting New York City to Fort Lee, New Jersey
- George Washington Memorial Bridge (commonly called the Aurora Bridge) in Seattle, Washington
- George Washington Memorial Parkway, an American parkway in Virginia and Maryland
- George Washington (train), a named train of the Chesapeake and Ohio Railway

== Other uses ==
- George Washington, Cuba, a village and ward
- George Washington Hotel (New York City), a defunct hotel and boarding house in Manhattan, New York
- Hotel George Washington (Jacksonville), a luxury hotel in operation from 1926 to 1971
- George Washington (horse), a racehorse

== See also ==
- George, Washington, an American city
- Jorge Washington (disambiguation)
