= George Washington (name) =

George Washington (1732–1799) was the commander-in-chief of Continental forces in the American Revolution and the first president of the United States.

Other persons with the same name include:

- George Washington (baseball) (1907–1985), American baseball player
- George Washington (inventor) (1871–1946), Belgium-born American inventor of an instant coffee process
  - George Washington Jr. (1899–1966), his son, inventor of a photoengraving process for newspapers
- George Washington (Louisiana politician) (1830–?), African-American state legislator in the 1870s
- George Washington (Mississippi politician) (fl. 1874–1875), African-American state legislator
- George Washington (trombonist) (born 1907), American jazz trombonist
- George Washington (Washington pioneer) (1817–1905), African American pioneer, founder of Centralia, Washington
- George Augustine Washington (1815–1892), American tobacco planter, slaveholder, company director and politician
- George C. Washington (1789–1854), United States Congressman from Maryland
- George Dewey Washington (1898–1954), American singer
- George Steptoe Washington (1771–1809), planter, militia officer and nephew of the first President
- George Thomas Washington (1908–1971), judge of the U.S. Court of Appeals for the D.C. Circuit
- George T. Washington (Liberia) (born 1928), Liberian political figure
- George Washington (sprinter), winner of the 1982 NCAA Division I outdoor 4 × 400 meter relay championship
- George W. Ashburn (1814–1868), full name George Washington Ashburn, American politician assassinated by the Ku Klux Klan

== See also ==
- George Washington (disambiguation)
- Georges Washington
- George Washington Carver
