= The Studio of Jean-Antoine Houdon =

Painting by Louis-Léopold Boilly

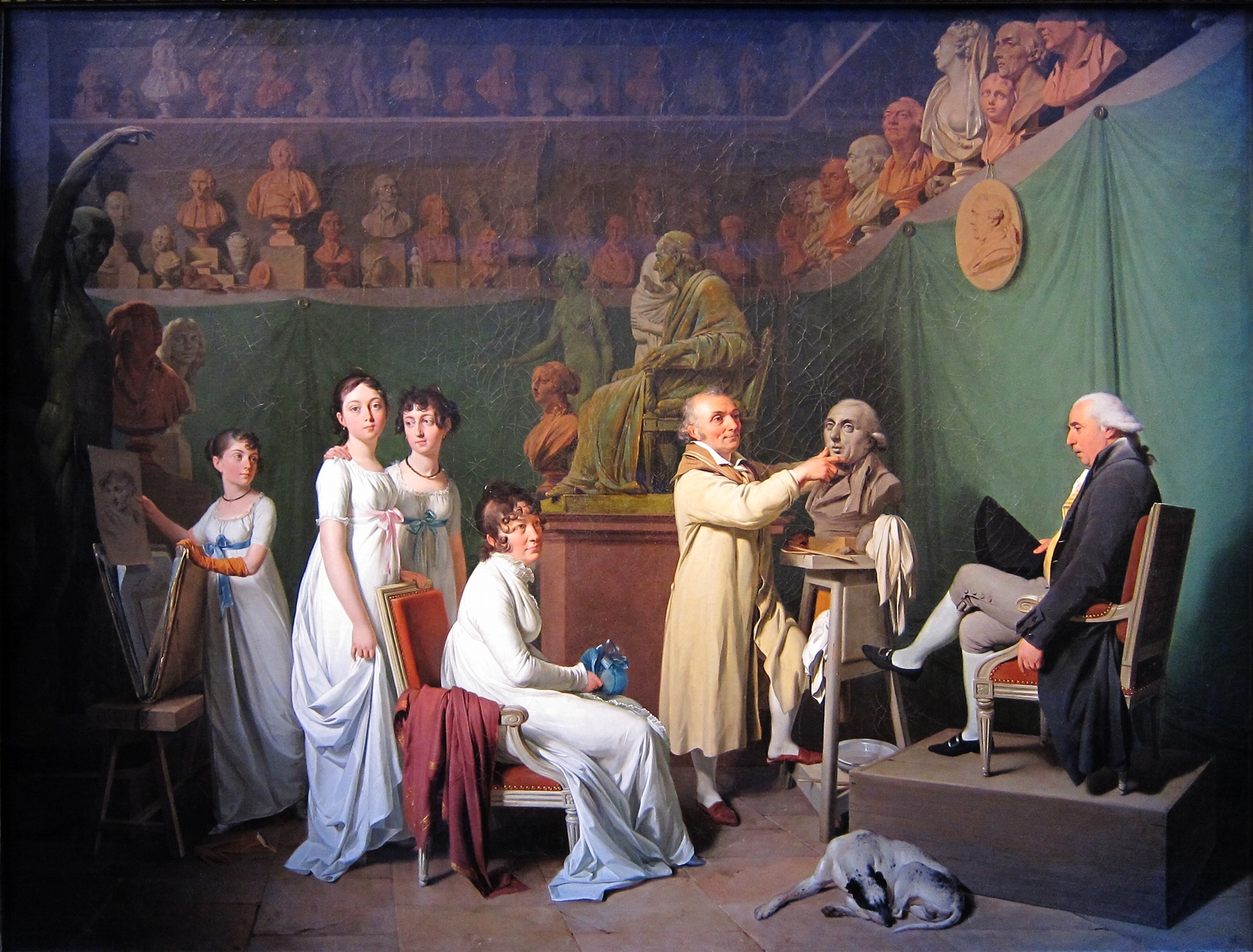
- Artist: Louis-Léopold Boilly
- Year: c.1804
- Type: Oil on canvas, genre painting
- Dimensions: 88 cm × 115 cm (35 in × 45 in)
- Location: Musée des Arts Décoratifs; Paris

The Studio of Jean-Antoine Houdon (French: L'atelier du sculpteur Houdon) is a c.1804 oil painting by the French artist Louis-Léopold Boilly. It depicts the interior of the Paris studio of the Neoclassical sculptor Jean-Antoine Houdon. He is shown with his wife and three daughters during a sitting.

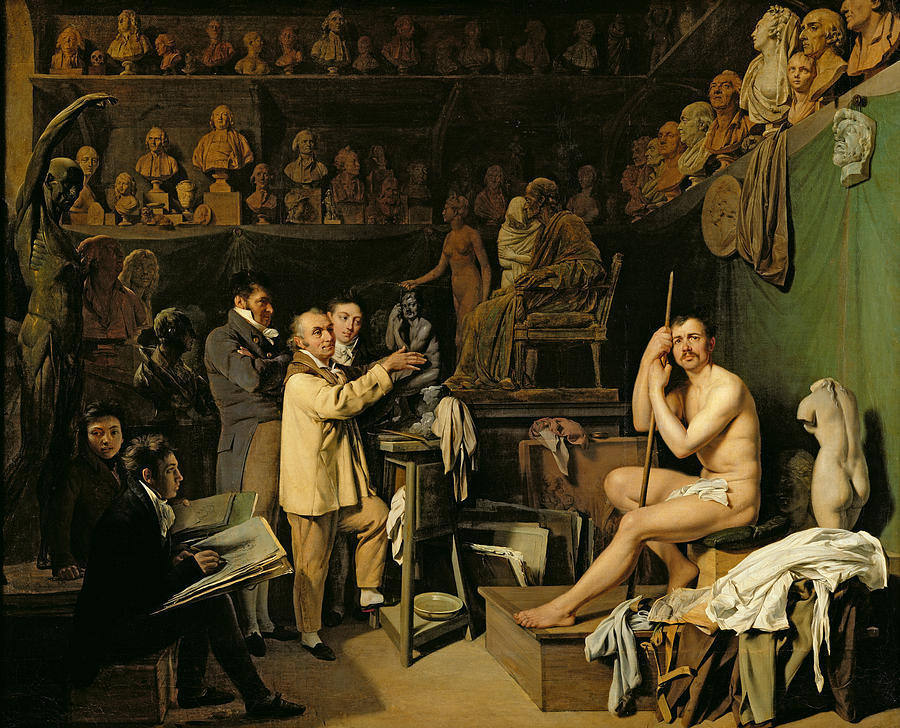
The Academy by Boilly 1808

Boilly was celebrated for his portraits and genre paintings of Parisian life and combines both in this painting. In an original sketch Boilly portrayed a bust of Napoleon. The version he exhibited at the Salon of 1804 featured the famous mathematician Pierre-Simon de Laplace. Several versions of the painting exist. An 1808 painting by Boilly showing a life class is sometimes known by the same title, although it was exhibited at the Salon of 1808 as The Academy. It is now in the Musée Thomas-Henry in Cherbourg.

== Bibliography ==
- Poulet, Anne L. Jean-Antoine Houdon: Sculptor of the Enlightenment. University of Chicago Press, 2003.
