= Jorge Washington =

Jorge Washington is a Spanish form of the name of George Washington (1732–1799), the first president of the United States of America. It is frequently used as a male given name.

Some notable people are:

- Jorge Washington Ábalos, an Argentine entomologist and author
- Jorge Washington Añón, a Uruguayan football manager
- Jorge Washington Beltrán, a Uruguayan politician
- Jorge Washington Bolaños, an Ecuadorian football player
- Jorge Washington Caraballo, a Uruguayan football player
- Jorge Washington Ladines, an Ecuadorian football player
- Jorge Washington Larrañaga Fraga, a Uruguayan politician
- Jorge Washington Larrañaga Vidal, a Uruguayan politician
- Jorge Washington Peña Hen, a Chilean composer and musician

== Other ==
- Several schools in Spanish-speaking countries bear this name, among others:
  - Colegio Jorge Washington, an international school in Cartagena de Indias, Colombia
- Día de Jorge Washington, a public holiday in Puerto Rico

== See also ==
- George Washington (disambiguation)
