= Washington Middle School =

Washington Middle School is the name of many middle schools, usually named after George Washington, including:

- Washington Middle School (Vista, California)
- Washington Middle School (Calumet, Michigan)
- Washington Middle School (Seattle, Washington)

== See also ==
George Washington Middle School (disambiguation)
