= George Washington School =

George Washington School may refer to:

- George Washington School (Elmira, New York), listed on the National Register of Historic Places in Chemung County, New York
- George Washington School (now housing Vare-Washington School), National Register of Historic Places listings in Philadelphia
- George Washington School (Kingsport, Tennessee), listed on the National Register of Historic Places in Sullivan County, Tennessee
- Colegio Jorge Washington, in Cartagena, Colombia

== See also ==
- George Washington High School (disambiguation)
- George Washington Middle School (disambiguation)
- George Washington Elementary School (disambiguation)
