= Winter (sculpture) =

- La Frileuse (French)
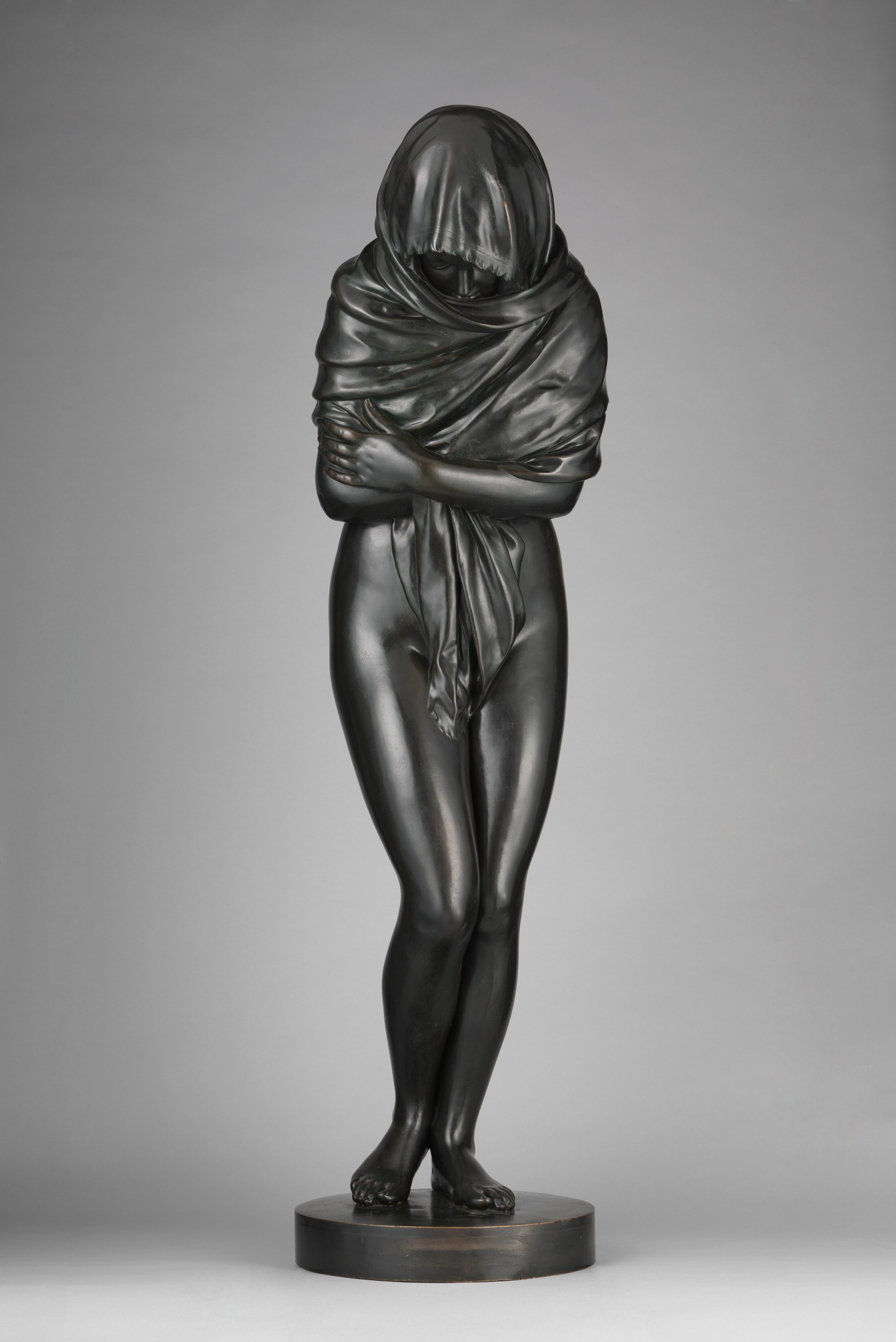
- Artist: Jean-Antoine Houdon
- Year: 1787
- Medium: Bronze
- Dimensions: 143.5 cm × 39.1 cm (56.5 in × 15.4 in)
- Location: Metropolitan Museum of Art

Winter is a bronze statue of a young woman cast by 18th century neoclassical sculptor Jean-Antoine Houdon in 1787. Houdon intended the statue to be an allegory of the winter season. This intent is reflected in both the medium (a cold, dark bronze) and features of the sculpture. Upon its completion, Winter and Bather, another work by Houdon, shocked the French artistic establishment with their perceived eroticism. Winter is currently on display at the Metropolitan Museum of Art. The statue is located in the Greek and Roman collection of the museum.

== Description ==
Winter depicts the nubile form of a young woman clad only in a shawl. The woman's arms are crossed across her chest and stomach, pressing her scant garment to her skin. Her gaze is downcast, while her right leg is slightly elevated and crossed before her left, pulling her body into a defensive posture. In terms of her clothing, the Metropolitan Museum of Art describes it as "elegant but hardly adequate". The hem of her shawl is visibly frayed, and the cloth barely covers her sensual body.

Winter image gallery
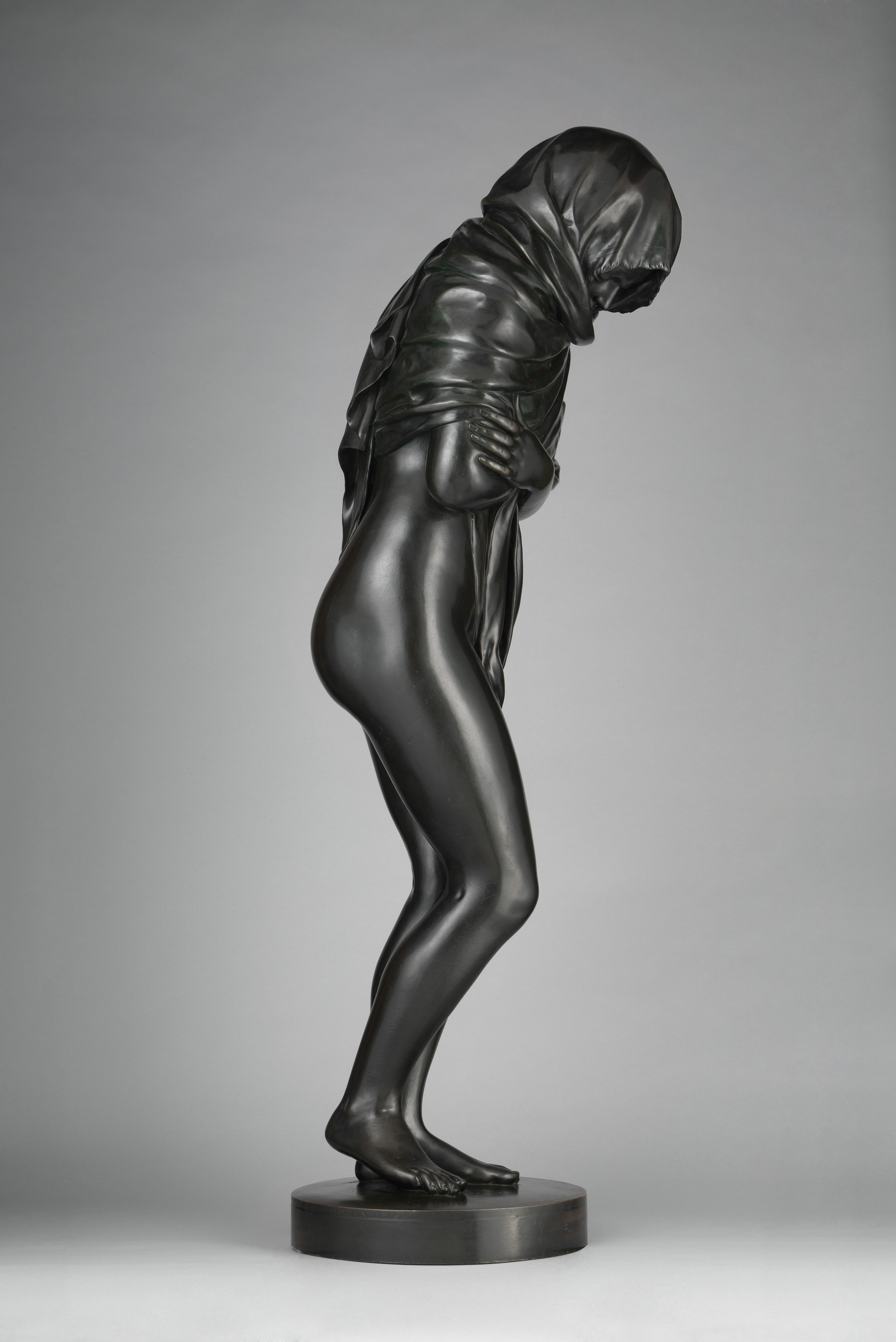
View of the statue's right side

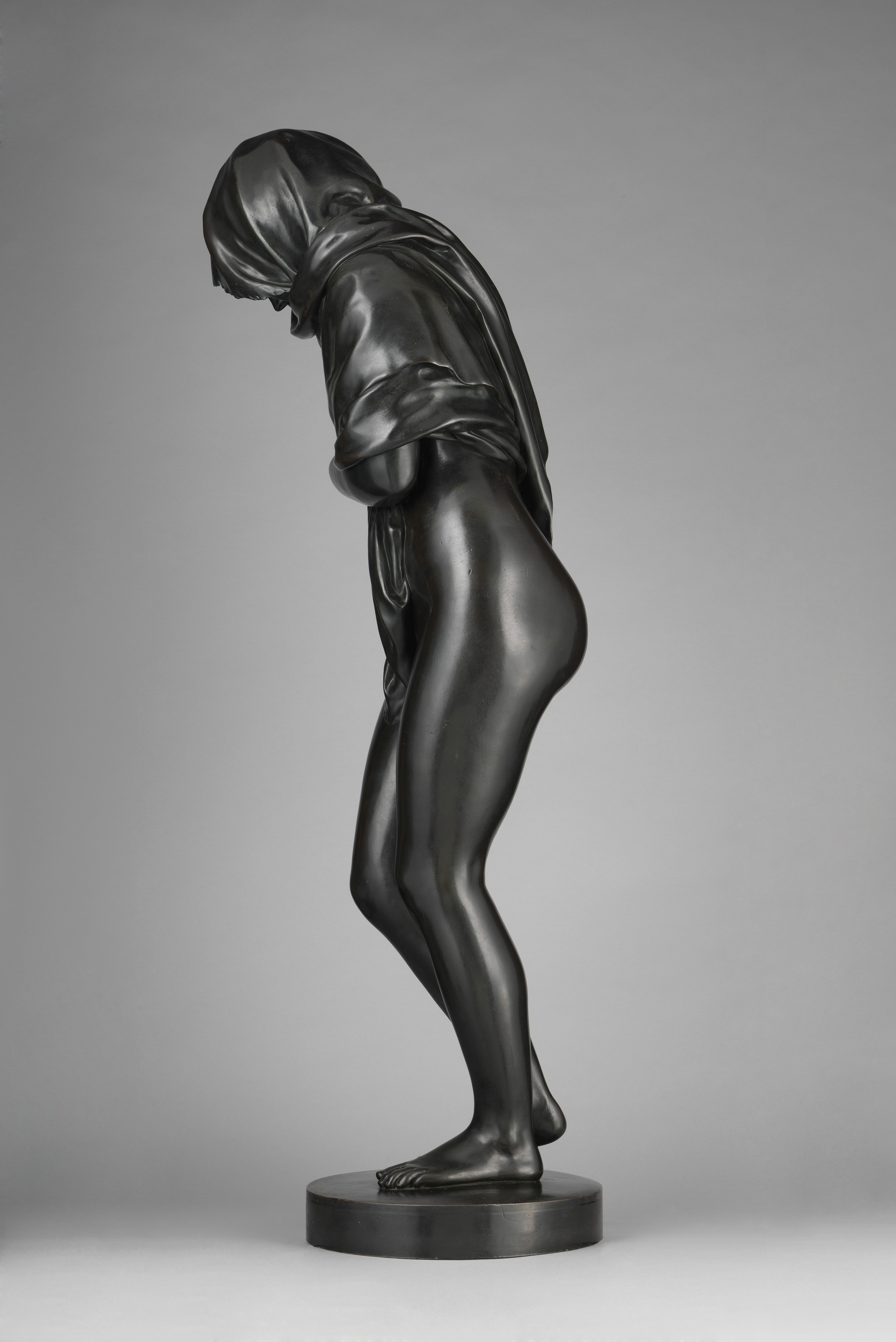
View of the statue's left side

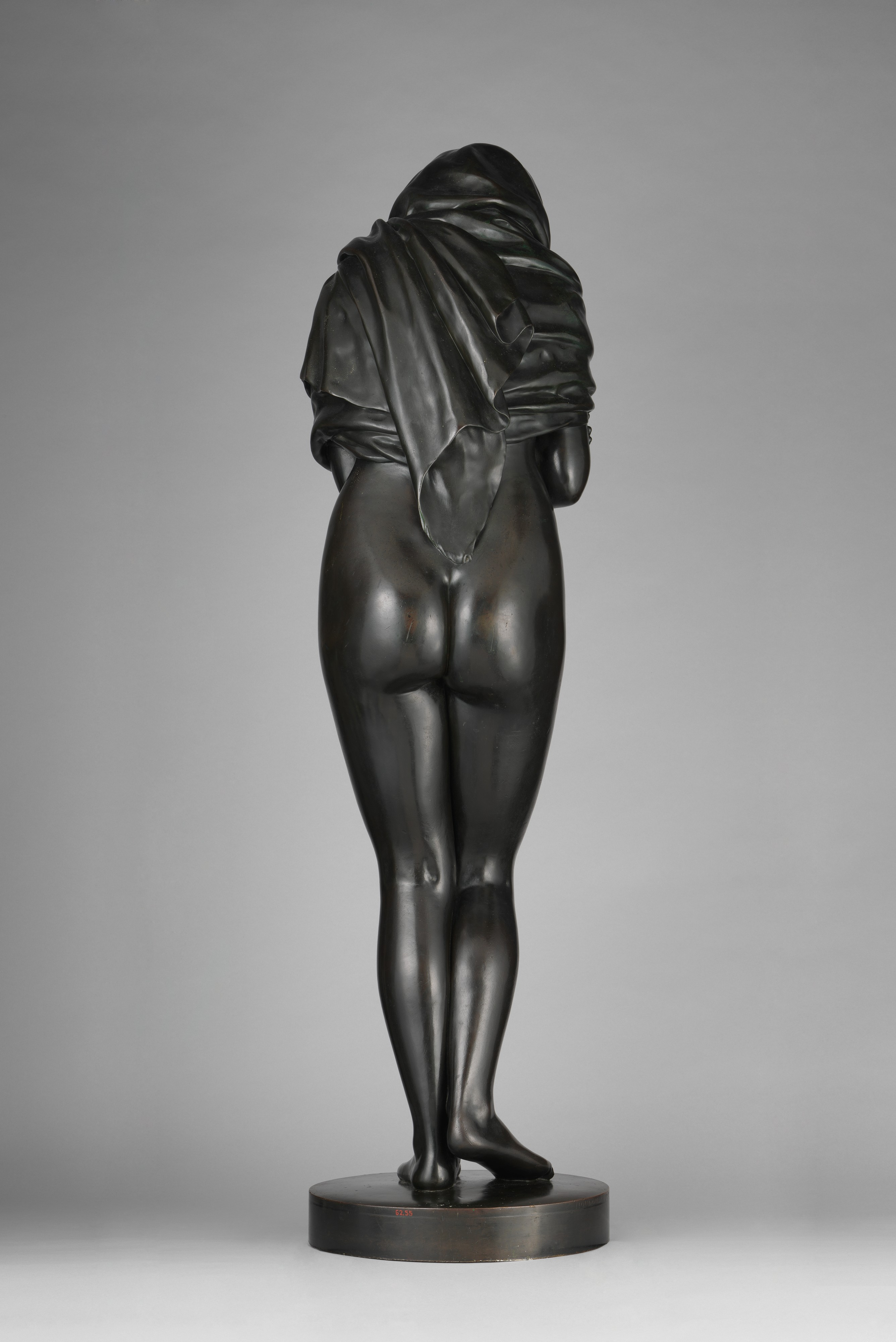
View of the statue from the rear

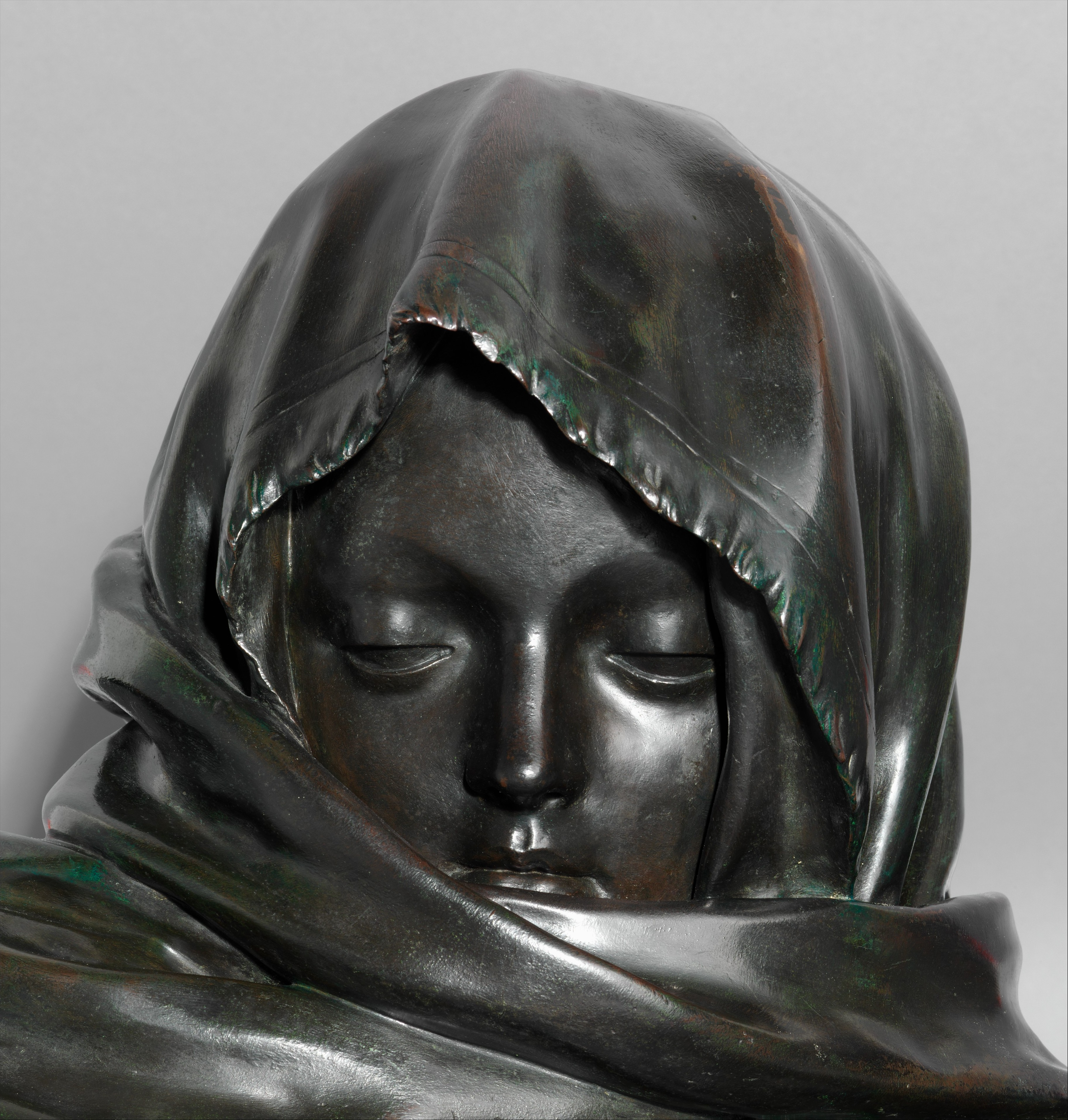
View of the statue's face
