= George Washington (copy of bust by Houdon) =

Public artwork in Indianapolis, Indiana

Coordinates: 39.76848°N 86.16254°W

George Washington (Houdon)
- Artist: Copy of Houdon bust
- Year: 1932
- Type: bust, sculpture
- Dimensions: 64 cm × 46 cm × 46 cm (25 in × 18 in × 18 in)
- Location: Indiana Statehouse, Indianapolis
- Owner: Indiana Historical Bureau

George Washington (bust by Houdon) is a public artwork that is a limited edition copy of an original work by French neoclassical sculptor Jean Antoine Houdon that is on display inside the Indiana Statehouse, which is located in Indianapolis, Indiana, United States. The artwork was cast a solid piece of plaster that has been painted white.

== Description ==
This piece is a bust of the first president of the United States, George Washington. It is made of white plaster, and its dimensions are 25 inches (64 cm) by 18 inches (46 cm) by 18 inches (46 cm). Washington is portrayed in a toga type drape, gazing upward to the proper left. Washington has no facial lines, and his hair is swept to the rear of his head in a pony tail. On the rear of the bust's base an inscription that reads "1732–1932 George Washington Bicentennial Commission." This bust is a copy of an original bust created from life by French sculptor Houdon.

== Historical information ==
George Washington was one of the Founding Fathers of the United States, and the first president of the United States. Washington was a statesman, soldier, and surveyor. He was also the Commander-in-chief the Army from June 15, 1775, to December 23, 1783, then again from July 3, 1798, to December 14, 1798. Washington was elected President of the United States and served in that role from April 30, 1789, until March 3, 1797.

The original bust was sculpted by French sculptor Jean Antoine Houdon in 1785 at George Washington's home, Mount Vernon, in Virginia. It is believed that Washington posed for the original sculpture. This bust was used as the primary image of George Washington for the Bicentennial Celebration of the first president's birthday in 1932, which was held from February 22 until Thanksgiving of the same year. The inscription on the rear of the bust refers to the Bicentennial Commission that was formed to oversee the celebration. The chief executive officer of the commission was the Honorable Sol Bloom, who was a member of the US Congress from New York State. President Herbert Hoover was the chairman of the commission.

The legal status of this piece is the Statehouse Inventories, and the credit line is through the Indiana Historical Bureau with an identification number of 99.2006.020.0069.

=== Location history ===
Originally, this piece was sighted as being placed in an alcove on the second floor of the Statehouse building, on the outside of the rotunda. It also used to have a bronze nameplate underneath. Currently, the piece sits in an alcove on the 4th floor of the Indiana Statehouse, and the bronze name plate is not currently being displayed with the bust.

== Artist ==
Jean Antoine Houdon was born March 20, 1742, in Versailles. He was a sculptor in the Neoclassical style and is considered to be the most famous sculptor of the latter half of the 18th century in France. Houdon was famous for his busts and portrait statues of inventors, philosophers, and political figures of the Enlightenment. Houdon also created sculptures of other famous American founding fathers, including Benjamin Franklin and Thomas Jefferson.

== Condition ==
The current condition of the sculpture is good, per assessment completed in April 2006.

== See also ==
- Abraham Lincoln (Jones)
- Ashbel Parsons Willard (Dexter)
- Daniel W. Voorhees (Voorhees)
- George Rogers Clark (McLary)
