= Statue of George Washington (Houdon) =

Sculpture by Jean-Antoine Houdon

Coordinates: 37.5386752041°N 77.4333327671°W

George Washington
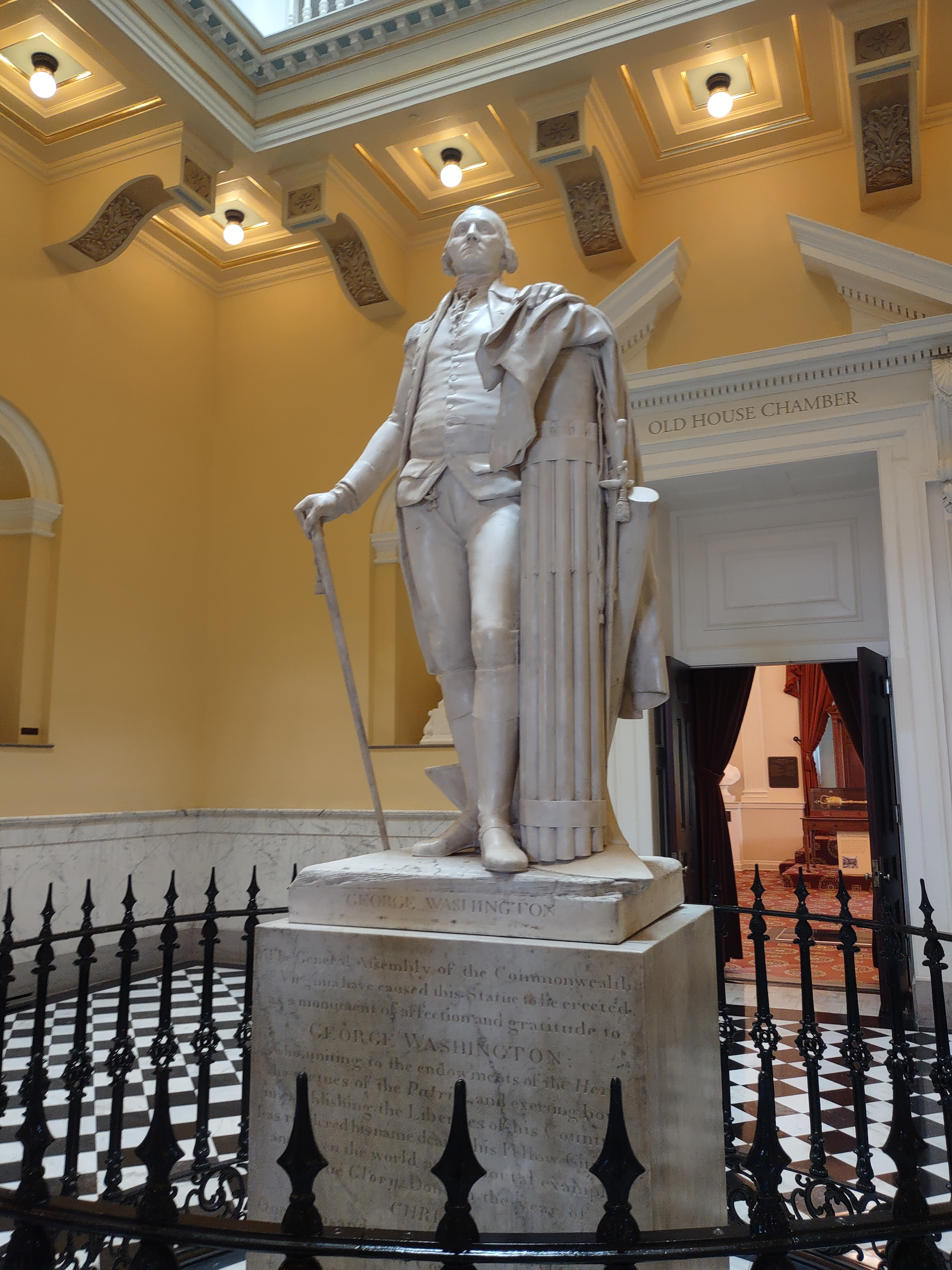
- The original sculpture in Richmond, Virginia
- Artist: Jean-Antoine Houdon
- Year: 1785–1792
- Medium: Carrara marble
- Location: Virginia State Capitol; Richmond, Virginia, U.S.
- Owner: Commonwealth of Virginia

George Washington is a statue by the French sculptor Jean-Antoine Houdon from the late 18th century. Based on a life mask and other measurements of Founding Father and first American president George Washington taken by Houdon, it is considered one of the most accurate depictions of the subject. The original sculpture is located in the rotunda of the Virginia State Capitol in Richmond, Virginia, and it has been copied extensively, with one copy standing in the United States Capitol rotunda.

The date given for the sculpture varies. It was commissioned by the Virginia General Assembly in 1784, begun in 1785, signed "1788", completed in 1791 or 1792, and delivered in 1796.

== Description ==
The original statue is carved from Carrara marble, weighing 18 tons. It depicts a standing life-sized Washington. In his right hand is a cane, his left arm rests on a fasces on which is slung his cape and sword, and at the back is a plow. He is shown wearing his military uniform, as Washington wished to be depicted in contemporary attire, rather than that of antiquity popular in Neo-classical sculpture.

With its selection of objects both civilian (the plow and cane) and military (the fasces, sword, and uniform), the statue has been interpreted as invoking the imagery and ideal of an Ancient Roman dictator, Cincinnatus, with whom Washington has been compared in his decision to retire from public life following the Revolutionary War. Washington was elected president of the Society of the Cincinnati in 1783. At the time of the statue's commission, Washington had not yet served in the Constitutional Convention and would not become President of the United States until 1789.

Chief Justice John Marshall, a contemporary of Washington's said of the work, "Nothing in bronze or stone could be a more perfect image than this statue of the living Washington."

== Houdon original ==
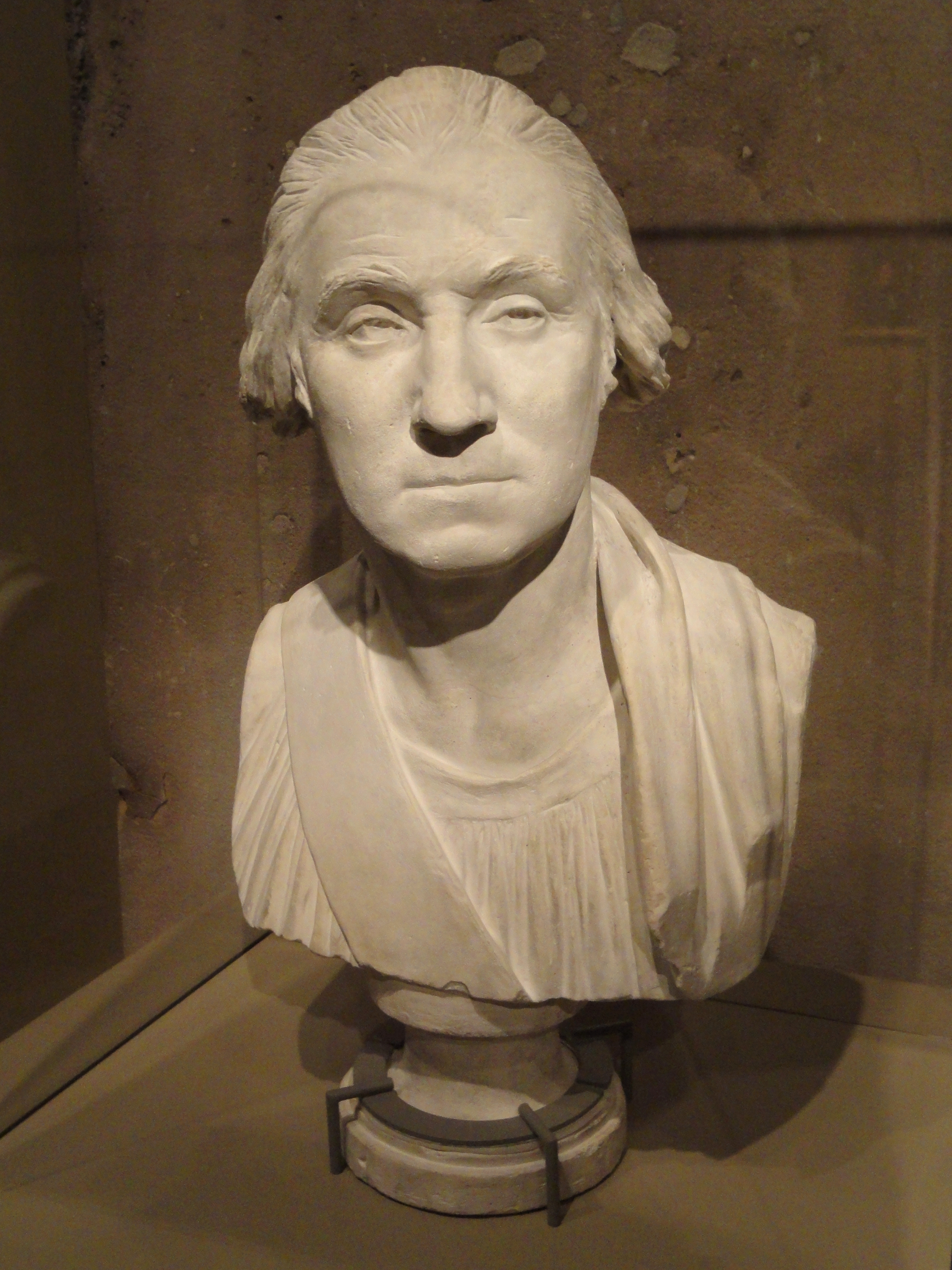
During the design process, Houdon produced this plaster bust of Washington in 1786. He later revised it before making the final statue. (National Portrait Gallery)

In 1784, the Virginia General Assembly commissioned a statue of George Washington "to be of the finest marble and the best workmanship," necessitating a European craftsman. The Governor of Virginia gave the responsibility of selecting the artist to Thomas Jefferson, then ambassador to France, who together with Benjamin Franklin recommended that Jean-Antoine Houdon, the most famous sculptor of the day, execute the work.

Unsatisfied to work from a drawing of Washington by Charles Willson Peale sent for the project, and lured by a potential commission for an equestrian monument by the Congress of the Confederation, Houdon agreed to travel to the United States to work directly from Washington. His voyage was conditional on his life being insured for the trip, asking "that ten thousand livres be paid to his family should he die during the voyage". On July 28, 1785, (or, July 22, 1785) Houdon sailed with Benjamin Franklin and "two of his workmen" from Southampton, England, arriving in Philadelphia, Pennsylvania on September 14.

In early October 1785, Houdon along with three assistants stayed at Washington's plantation Mount Vernon, taking detailed measurements of Washington's arms, legs, hands and chest and making a life mask of his face. By December, Houdon had returned to France.

Though inscribed with the date "1788", it was completed in France in 1791 or 1792 (depending on the source). It was finally delivered to Richmond in 1796 and placed in the rotunda on May 14, 1796. Various explanations for the delay in its delivery have been given, including the French Revolution and untimely payments to Houdon, though most sources agree that the continued construction of the new Virginia State Capitol prevented its installation until the time it arrived.

The equestrian monument that originally attracted Houdon to America was never commissioned. The 1783 resolution authorizing such a statue would eventually be fulfilled in 1860 when Clark Mills's equestrian statue of George Washington was installed at Washington Circle.

In the early 21st century the statue, together with the life mask and bust created by Houdon during the design process, were used as part of a forensic reconstruction of George Washington at various ages undertaken by Mount Vernon.

== Copies ==
Beginning in the 19th century, numerous copies of the statue have been made in bronze and plaster, with molds often made directly from the original.

=== Hubard casts ===
Following the destruction of a statue of Washington created by Antonio Canova when the North Carolina State House burned in 1831, there was a fear that a similar fate might befall Houdon's statue. During the 1850s, the Virginia General Assembly authorized the casting of 11 bronze copies of the monument. Six bronzes were produced by the foundry of Richmond artist William James Hubard. Known casts from the Hubard foundry are located at:

- Virginia Military Institute in Lexington, Virginia, unveiled in 1856. After the occupation of Lexington in the American Civil War, it was temporarily relocated to Wheeling, West Virginia, and returned in 1866.
- North Carolina State Capitol, in 1857. It was the first monument placed on the new capitol's grounds, designed to replace the destroyed Canova statue.
- South Carolina State House grounds in Columbia, South Carolina, 1853, and installed in 1858
- Another traveled around a bit, finally finding a home in Lafayette Park, St. Louis, Missouri in 1914
- Rotunda of Alumni Hall at Miami University, Oxford, Ohio
- New York City Hall, cast 1857, purchased 1884

A plaster cast by Hubard, once located in the U.S. Capitol, was moved in 1950 to the Smithsonian American Art Museum, and in 2007 transferred to the Jamestown-Yorktown Foundation in Virginia.

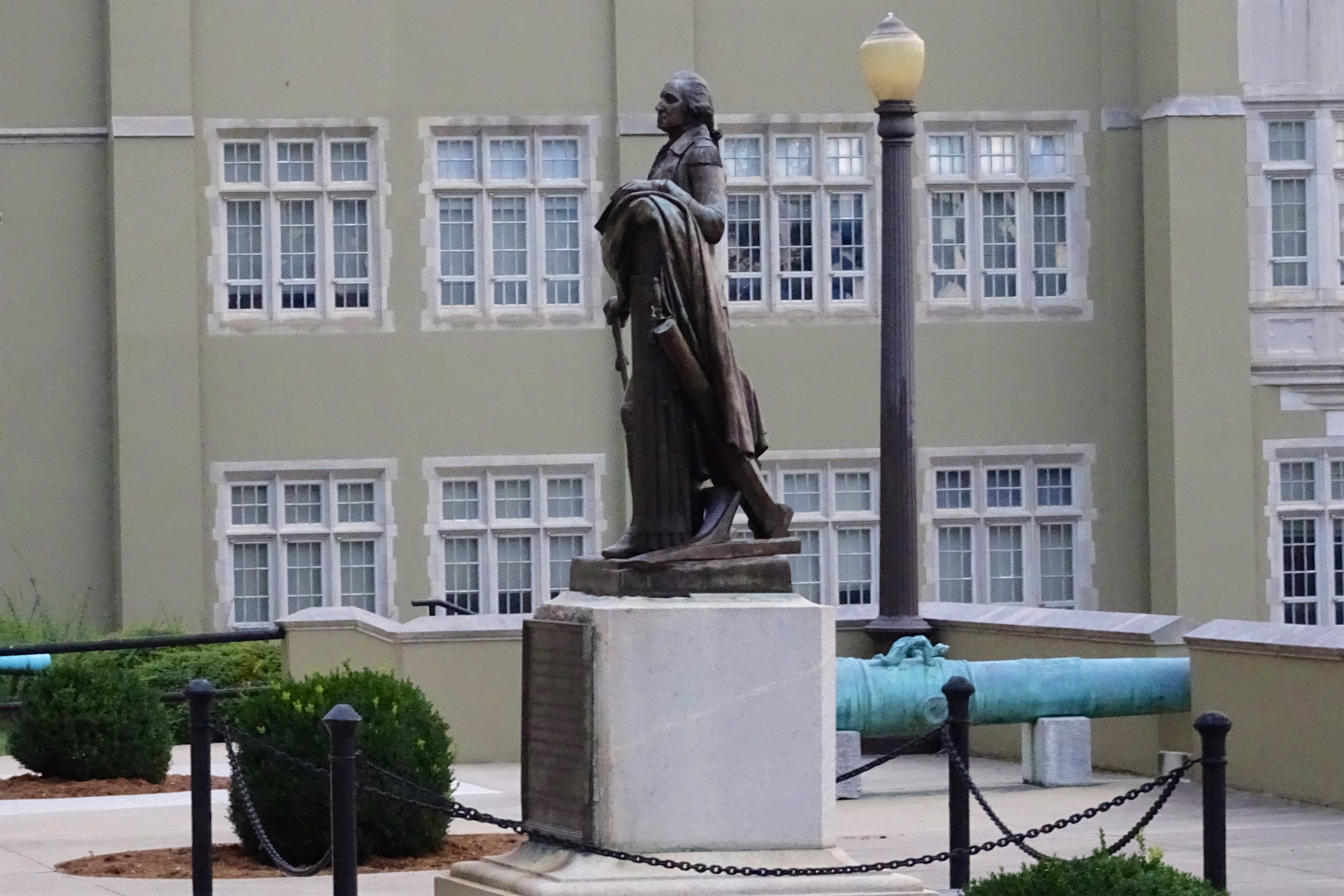
George Washington cast by Hubard, at the Virginia Military Institute

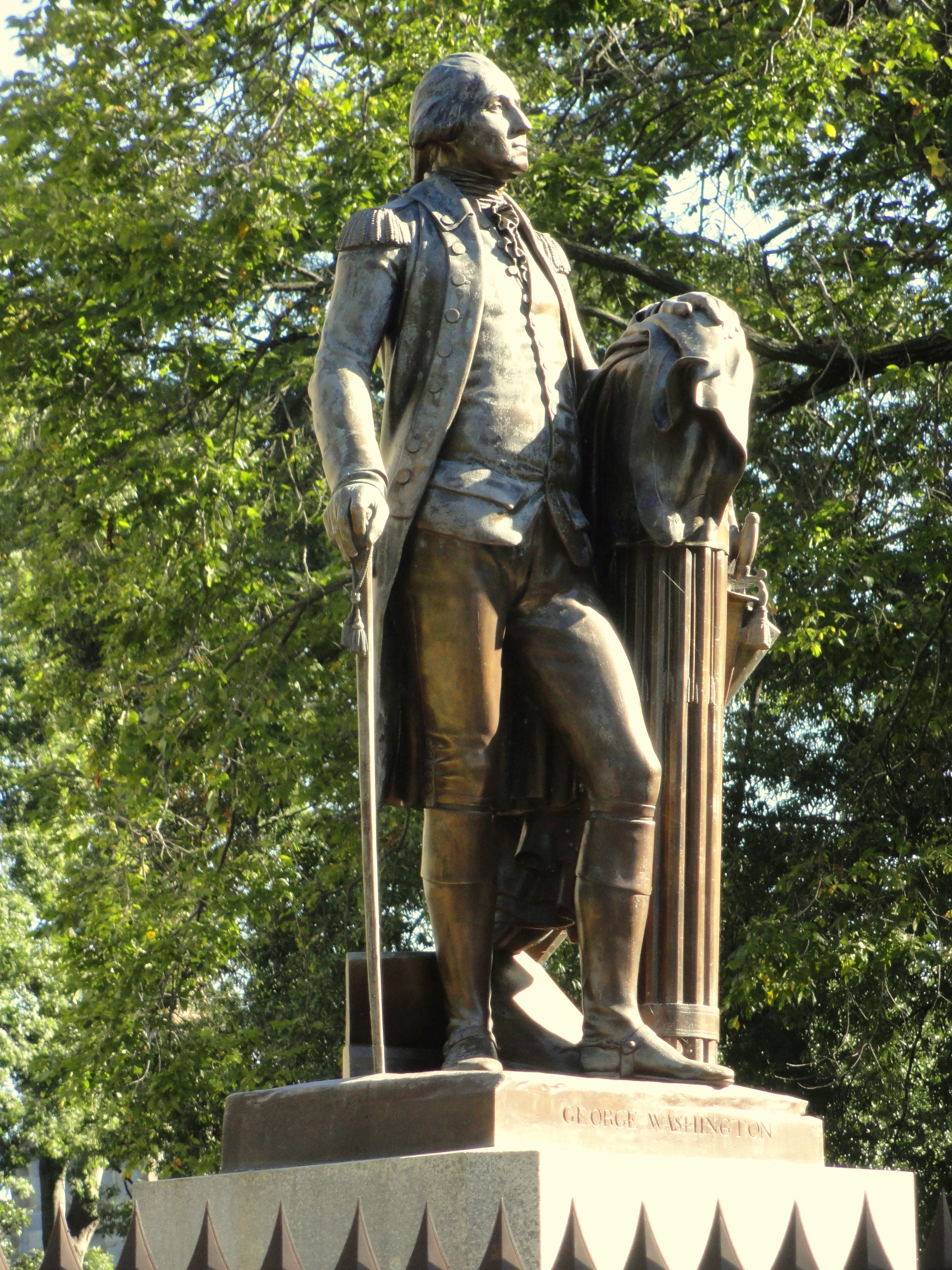
At the North Carolina State Capitol

=== Gorham casts ===
In the early 20th century (1908 or 1909), the Commonwealth of Virginia commissioned a new cast to be added to the National Statuary Hall Collection. It is now one of six state statues located in the United States Capitol rotunda in Washington, D.C.

In 1910 an act of the general Assembly of Virginia stated, "That the permission and authority of the State of Virginia be .... granted to the Gorham Manufacturing Company .... to make further copies or reproductions of the Houdon statue of George Washington from the molds now in possession of said company... belonging to the State of Virginia, for any National, State, Territorial, County of Municipal Government ...... for any university, college, school, library, art gallery, or other educational institution: for any patriotic society ..... related to the history and achievements of George Washington." Each copy was to be stamped with the great seal of Virginia and the phrase, "Copied from the original by Houdon..." Gorham was to pay the state $500 for every statue made. The Virginia legislature banned future taking of molds, and so the subsequent casts were made from existing molds.

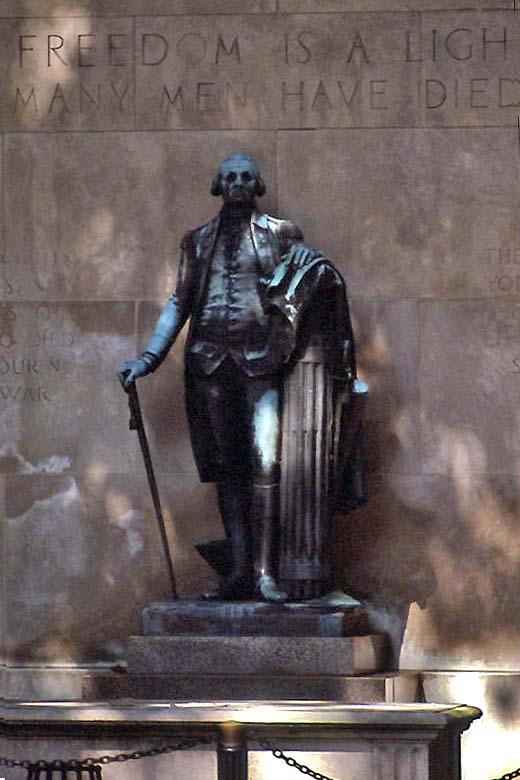
Gorham cast in Philadelphia

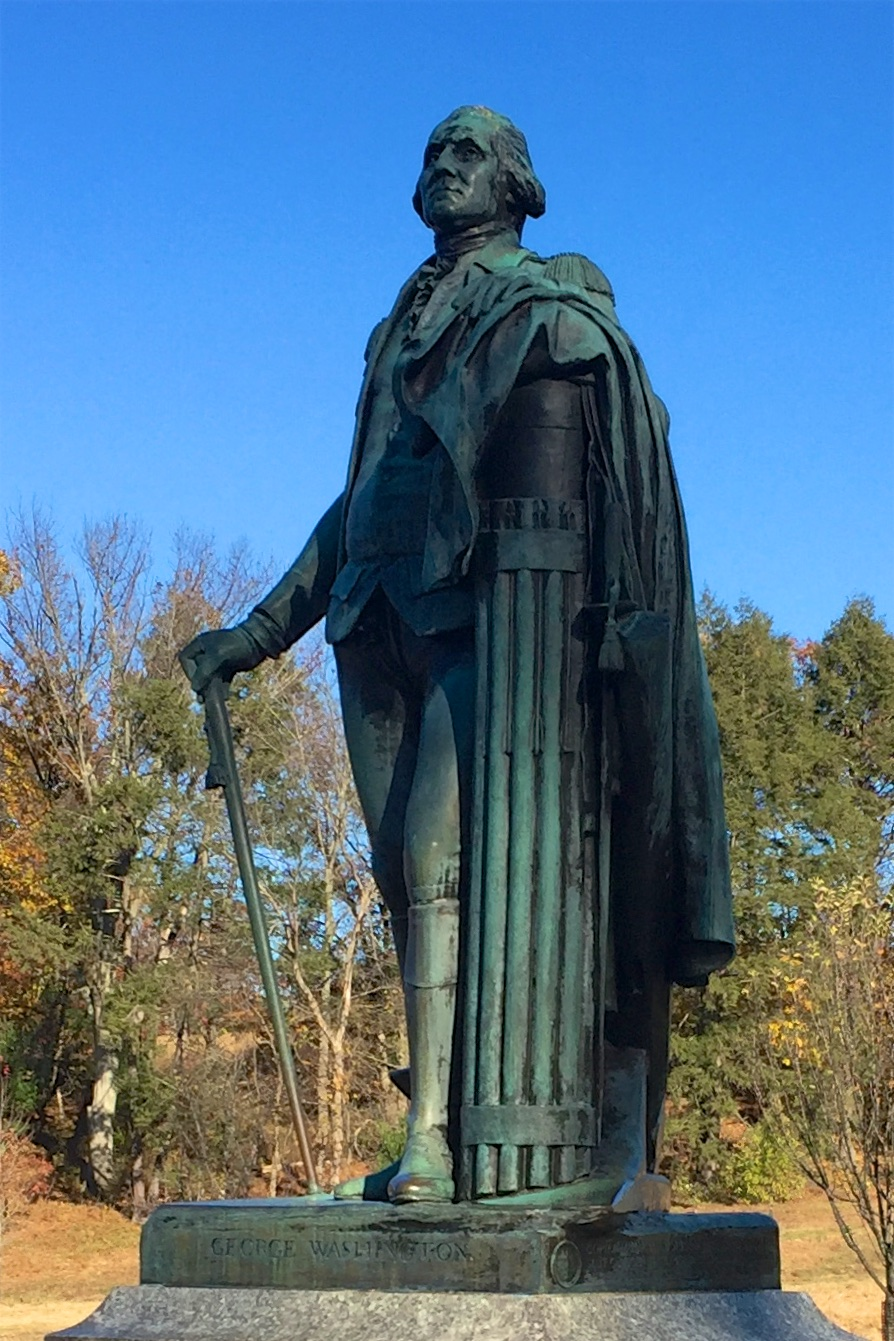
In the Valley Forge National Park

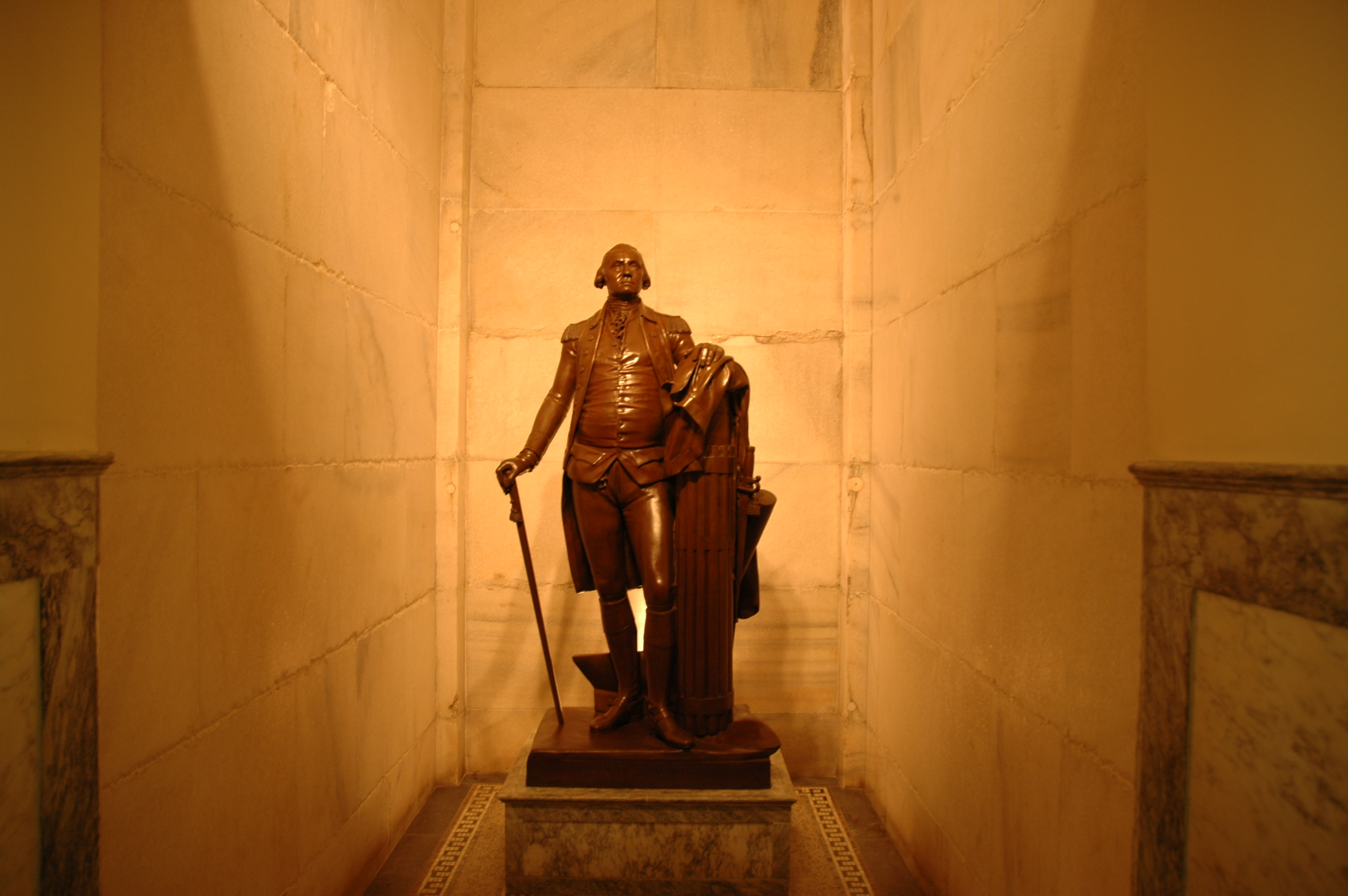
Inside the Washington Monument

The known locations of the Gorham casts include:

- In 1910, the Virginia General Assembly presented a bronze copy to the people of France using the Gorham molds.
- Springfield, Massachusetts
- Jefferson Memorial Park, Pittsburgh, Pennsylvania, 1910
- Oshkosh, Wisconsin, 1911
- University of Virginia, Charlottesville, Virginia, dedicated 1913
- The Art Institute of Chicago, 1917, originally placed in front of the museum, but in 1979 moved indoors, and presently in the Chicago City Hall
- Trafalgar Square in London, 1921
- Lima, Peru, dedicated July 4, 1922
- Philadelphia, Pennsylvania, 1922, first given to the Philadelphia Museum of Art in 1922 and then moved to Washington Square in 1954
- National Heritage Museum, Lexington, Massachusetts; cast 1924

Further copies were produced for the bicentennial of Washington's birth, and are located in:

- Fair Oaks Park, Minneapolis, Minnesota, donated 1931, dedicated 1932, obtained by a local branch of the DAR, and toppled in November 2020.
- Valley Forge National Historical Park, Valley Forge, Pennsylvania
- Civic Center Plaza, Los Angeles, California; cast and presented 1933
- City College of New York, 1931
- Redwood Library and Athenaeum, Newport, Rhode Island. Dedicated 1932
- Albany, New York, dedicated 1932
- the quad at George Washington University, 1932
- Maxwell School foyer at Syracuse University, 1937

=== Other casts ===
Since the Gorham castings, a few additional ones have been made:

- John M. Olin Library on the campus of Washington University in St. Louis, St. Louis, Missouri, cast 2004
- Larz Anderson House, headquarters of the Society of the Cincinnati, Washington, D.C., cast 2008

In addition to bronze castings, an unknown number of plaster casts were made, including one from 1932 on display in the Indiana Statehouse in Indianapolis, Indiana, and one in George Washington Hall of the University of Mary Washington in Fredericksburg, Virginia of unknown make, dating to the 1930s.

== See also ==
- Cultural depictions of George Washington
- List of monuments dedicated to George Washington
- List of statues of George Washington
- List of public art in Washington, D.C., Ward 2
- List of sculptures of presidents of the United States
