= George Washington (steamboat) =

Exploded 1852

George Washington was a steamboat that ran on the Mississippi River system in the mid-19th century.

== Explosion ==
The George Washington's boilers exploded near Grand Gulf, Mississippi on January 14, 1852. The death toll was approximately 20 killed, with some counts running as high as 30. The loss of the George Washington was one of the steamboat catastrophes described in Lloyd's Steamboat Directory, and Disasters on Western Waters. Another steamboat, the Martha Washington, was coincidentally destroyed the same day near Memphis, Tennessee.
