= George Washington (Mississippi politician) =

American politician

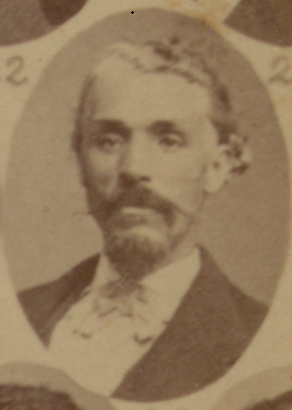

George Washington was an American state legislator in Mississippi. He represented Carroll County, Mississippi in the Mississippi House of Representatives in 1874 and 1875. He was documented as being "colored".

== See also ==
- African American officeholders from the end of the Civil War until before 1900
