= George Washington (Louisiana politician) =

State legislator in Louisiana

George Washington (born 1830) was an American cotton planter and state legislator in the U.S. state of Louisiana. He represented Concordia Parish in the Louisiana House of Representatives from 1870 to 1874 and from 1877 to 1879. He also served on the parish's school board in 1870. He served on the House Committee on Public Lands and Levees chaired by P. Jones Yorke.

In 1872, he and David Young were elected to represent Concordia Parish.

== See also ==
- African American officeholders from the end of the Civil War until before 1900
