= Georges Washington =

French painter

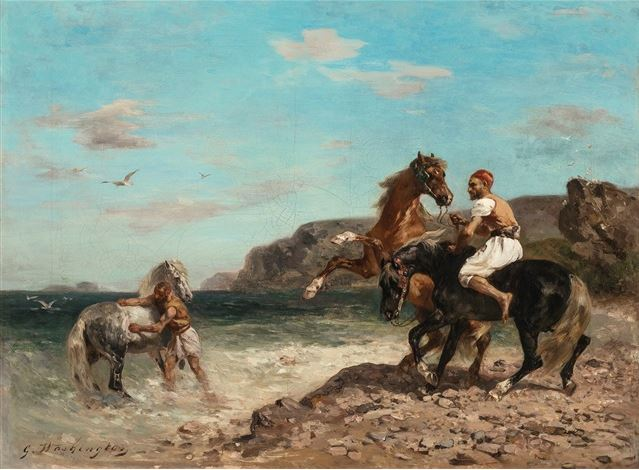
Arabian Horsemen at the Sea

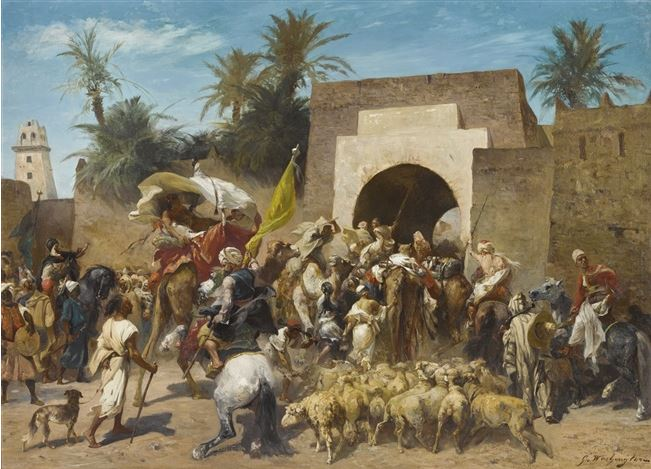
Returning from the Razzia

Georges Washington (7 September 1827 – 1901) was a French Orientalist painter. Most of his works featured soldiers and horses.

== Biography ==
Georges Washington was born out of wedlock in Marseille. His father named him after George Washington, whom he greatly admired. His mother did not officially recognize him as her child until 1868.

Washington's initial studies were with François-Edouard Picot, a history painter. Displeased with his education, he went to visit Algeria for inspiration. His first exhibit at the Salon came in 1857, and he would exhibit there for fifty years. He returned to North Africa in 1879, on commission from two Belgian companies, and toured Morocco. This was followed by a trip through Eastern Europe, via Turkey, and ended with an exhibition in Moscow in 1881. He was greatly influenced by Eugène Fromentin and Eugène Delacroix.

In 1884 Washington's father-in-law, the battle painter Félix Philippoteaux, died and left him a modest apartment in Montmartre. Shortly after, he sold several paintings at the Hôtel Drouot, in an effort to raise money for a farm in Brittany, but he was not successful. He received a new commission that required him to work in New York City, but things did not go well and he returned under difficult financial circumstances. He continued to paint a bit more, at his studio in Montmartre, then retired to Douarnenez to live with his daughter and son-in-law.

Washington's works may be seen at the Musée des Beaux-Arts de Dunkerque, Musée des Beaux-Arts de Limoges , Musée Paul-Valéry in Sète and Dolmabahçe Palace in Istanbul.
