= George Washington Elementary School =

George Washington Elementary School may refer to:

- George Washington Elementary School, School City of East Chicago school district, Illinois
- George Washington Elementary School, Mohegan Lake, New York; see Lakeland Central School District
- George Washington Elementary School, Pigtown, Baltimore, Maryland
- George Washington Elementary School, Burbank, California; see Burbank Unified School District
- George Washington Elementary School, Daly City, California; Jefferson Elementary School District
- George Washington School (now housing Vare-Washington School), Philadelphia, Pennsylvania
- George Washington Elementary School, Union City, New Jersey; see Union City Board of Education

== See also ==
- George Washington School (disambiguation)
- Washington Elementary School (disambiguation)
