= Jean-Antoine Houdon =

French sculptor (1741–1828)

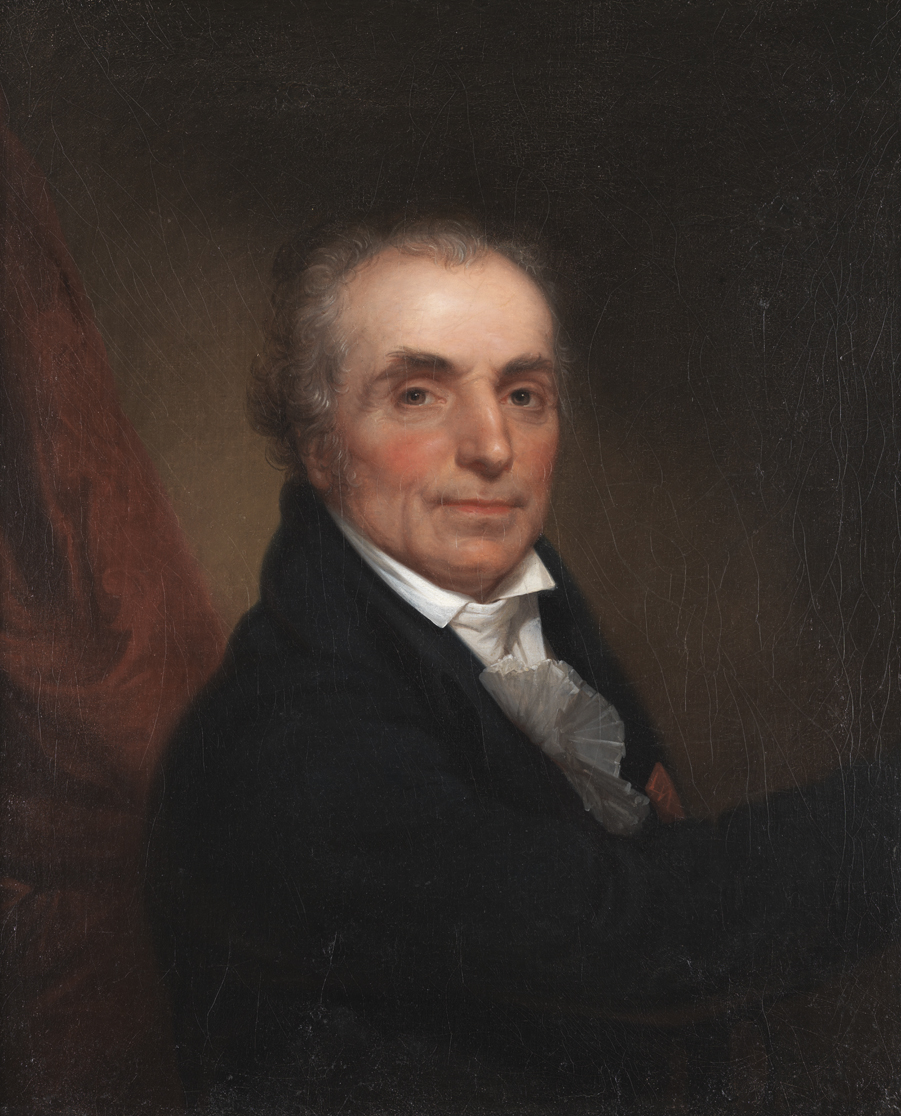
- 1808 portrait by Rembrandt Peale
- Born: 20 March 1741; Versailles, France
- Died: 15 July 1828 (aged 87); Paris, France
- Education: Académie royale de peinture et de sculpture
- Known for: Portrait sculpture
- Notable work: Statue of George Washington
- Spouse: Marie-Ange-Cecile Langlois
- Awards: Prix de Rome

Jean-Antoine, chevalier Houdon (French: [ʒɑ̃ ɑ̃twan udɔ̃]; 20 March 1741 – 15 July 1828) was a French neoclassical sculptor.

Houdon is famous for his portrait busts and statues of philosophers, inventors and political figures of the Enlightenment. Houdon's subjects included Denis Diderot (1771), Benjamin Franklin (1778-1809), Jean-Jacques Rousseau (1778), Voltaire (1781), Molière (1781), George Washington (1785–1788), Thomas Jefferson (1789), Louis XVI (1790), Robert Fulton (1803–04), and Napoléon Bonaparte (1806).

== Biography ==
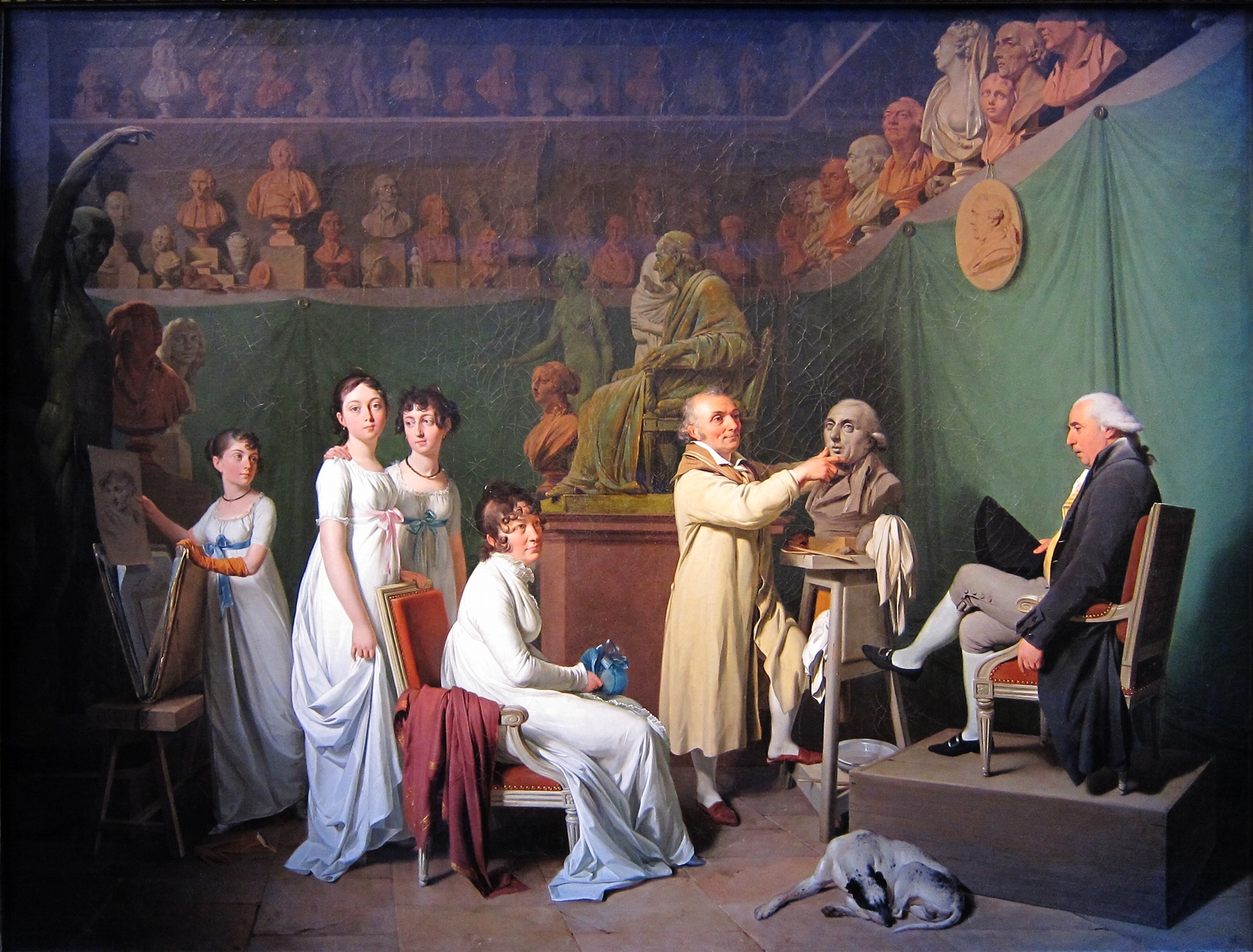
The Studio of Jean-Antoine Houdon, 1804, by Louis-Léopold Boilly, Musée des Arts Décoratifs, Paris.

Houdon was born in Versailles, on 20 March 1741. In 1752, he entered the Académie royale de peinture et de sculpture, where he studied with René-Michel Slodtz, Jean-Baptiste Lemoyne, and Jean-Baptiste Pigalle. From 1761 to 1764, he studied at the École royale des élèves protégés.

Houdon won the Prix de Rome in 1761, but was not greatly influenced by ancient and Renaissance art in Rome. His stay in the city is marked by two characteristic and important productions: the superb écorché (1767), an anatomical model which has served as a guide to all artists since his day, and the statue of Saint Bruno in the church of Santa Maria degli Angeli e dei Martiri in Rome. After four years in Italy, Houdon returned to Paris.

He submitted Morpheus to the Salon of 1771. He developed his practise of portrait busts. He became a member of the Académie de peinture et de sculpture in 1771, and a professor in 1778. In 1778, he modeled Voltaire, producing a portrait bust with wig for the Comédie-Française; one for the Palace of Versailles, and one for Catherine the Great.

In 1778, he joined the masonic lodge Les Neuf Sœurs, where he later met Benjamin Franklin, and John Paul Jones. For Salon of 1781, he submitted a Diana which was refused without drapery.

Houdon's portrait sculpture of Washington was the result of a specific invitation by Benjamin Franklin to cross the Atlantic in 1785, specifically to visit Mount Vernon, so that Washington could model for him. Washington sat for wet clay life models and a plaster life mask. These models served for many commissions of Washington, including the standing figure commissioned by the Virginia General Assembly, for the Virginia State Capitol in Richmond. Numerous variations of the Washington bust were produced, portraying him variously as a general in uniform, in the classical manner showing chest musculature, and as Roman Consul Lucius Quinctius Cincinnatus clad in a toga.

In the 1780s, Houdon produced two semi-nude sculptures, Winter and Bather.

Perceived as bourgeois for his connections to the court of Louis XVI, he fell out of favour during the French Revolution, although he escaped imprisonment. Houdon returned to favor during the French Consulate and Empire, being taken on as one of the original artistic team for what became the Column of the Grande Armée at Wimille.

He was made a Chevalier de la Légion d'honneur, on 17 December 1804. He was created a Chevalier de l'Empire in 1809, which was made hereditary by letters patent in 1816.

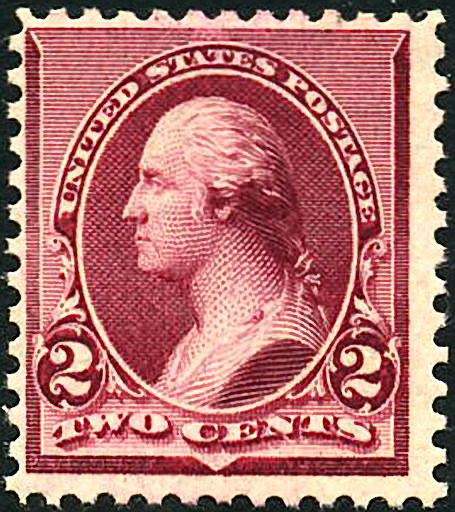
American Bank Note Co Issue of 1890

Houdon died in Paris on 15 July 1828, and was interred at the Montparnasse Cemetery.

== Family ==
On 1 July 1786, he married Marie-Ange-Cecile Langlois; they had three daughters: Sabine, Anne-Ange, and Claudine.

== Legacy and influence ==
Houdon's sculptures were used as models for the engravings used on various U.S. postage stamps of the late 19th and early 20th centuries which depict Washington in profile.

== Gallery ==
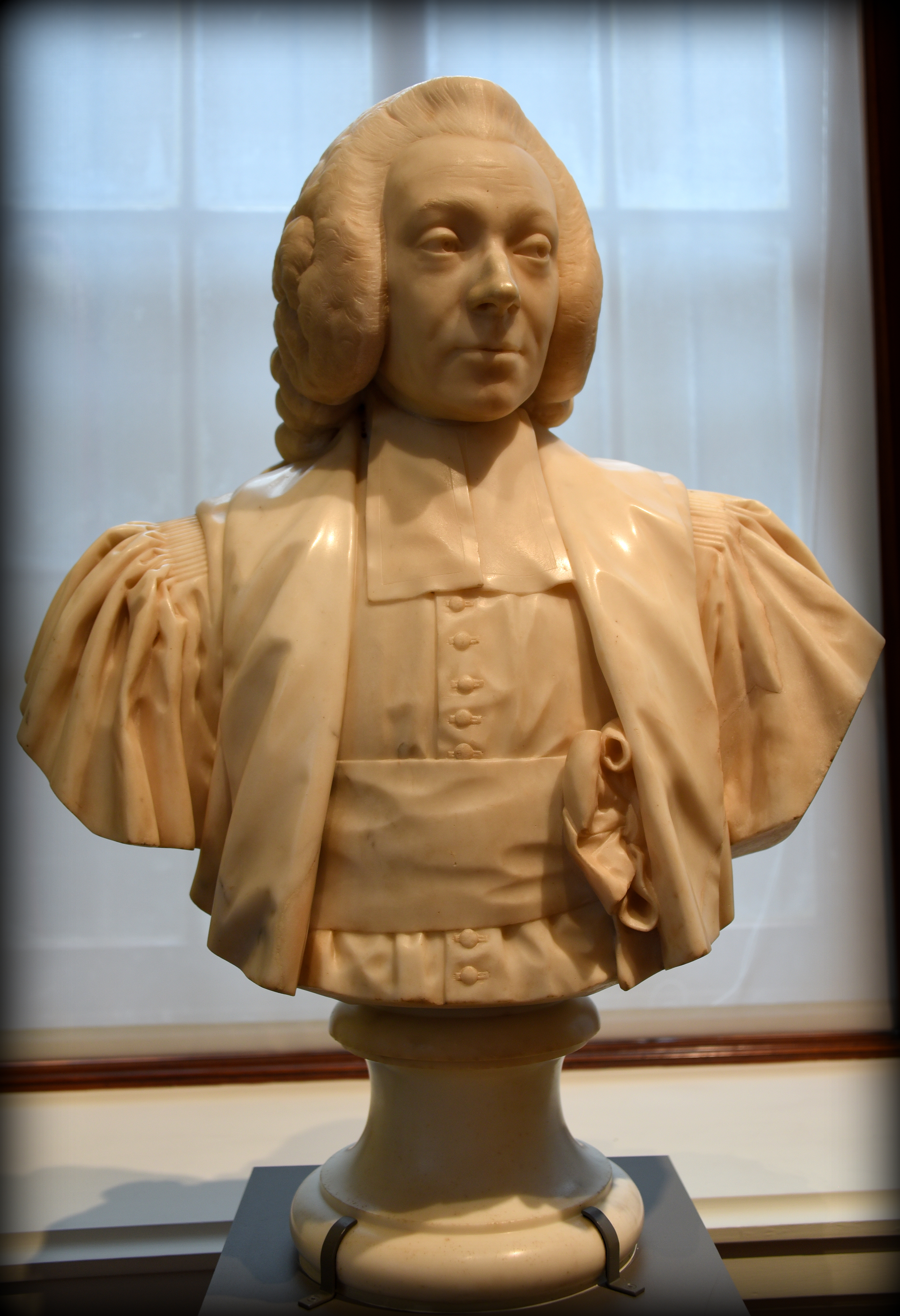
Bust of Armand Thomas Hue de Miromesnil, 1775, Victoria and Albert Museum

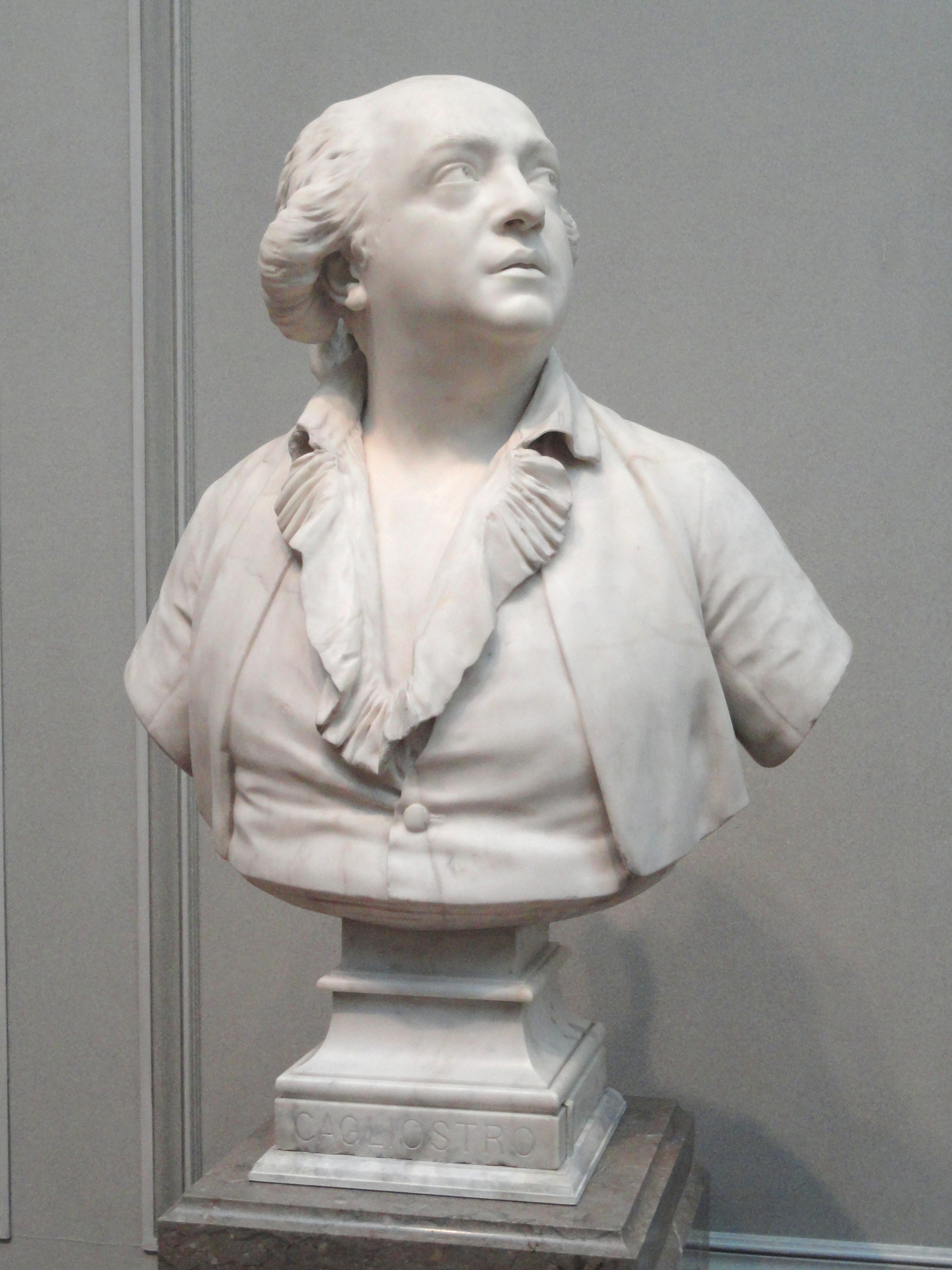
Bust of Alessandro Cagliostro, 1786, National Gallery of Art

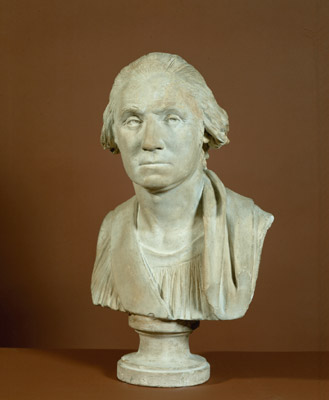
Bust of Washington based on a life mask cast in 1786, National Portrait Gallery

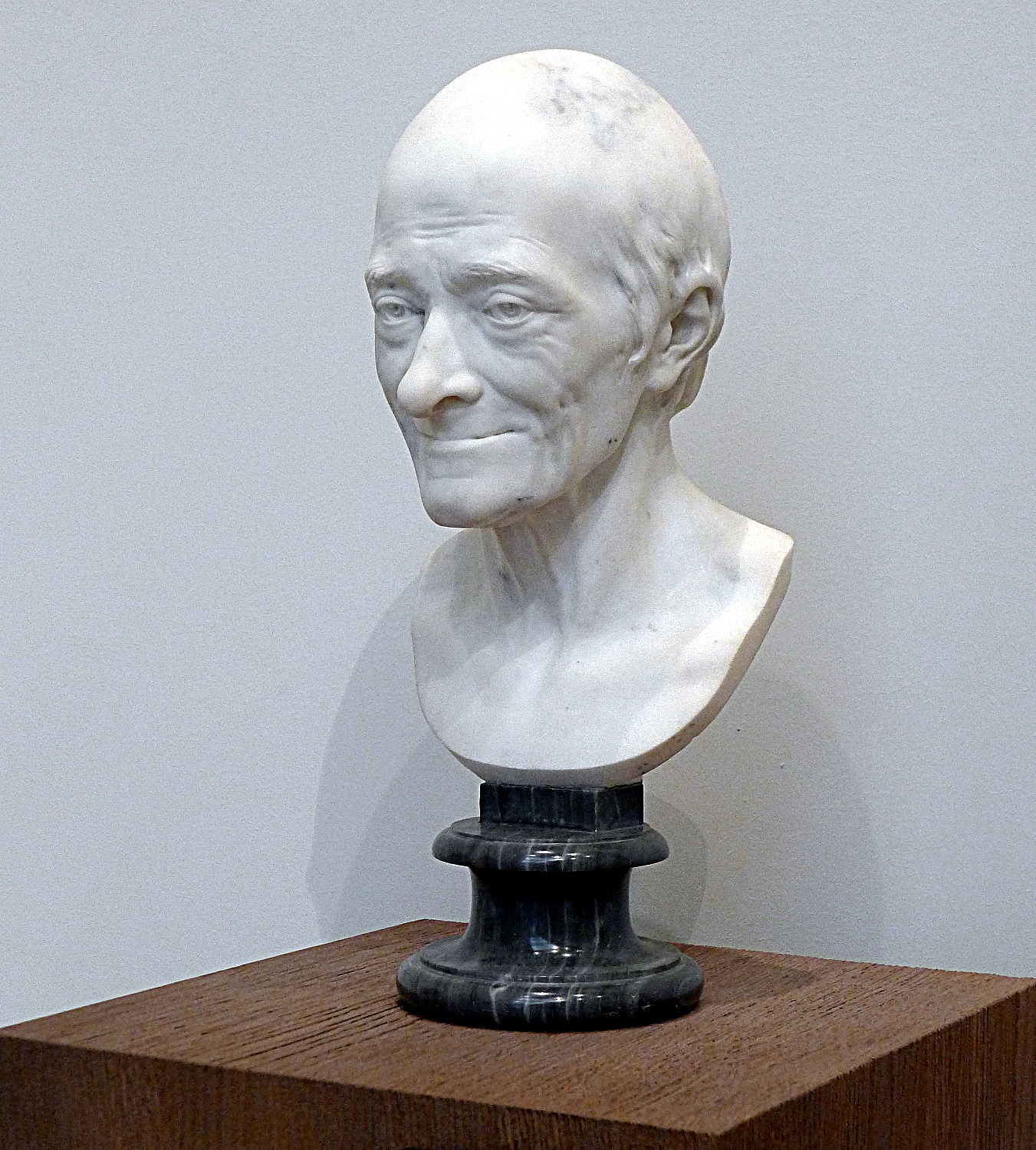
Bust of Voltaire, 1778, Musée des Beaux-Arts d'Angers

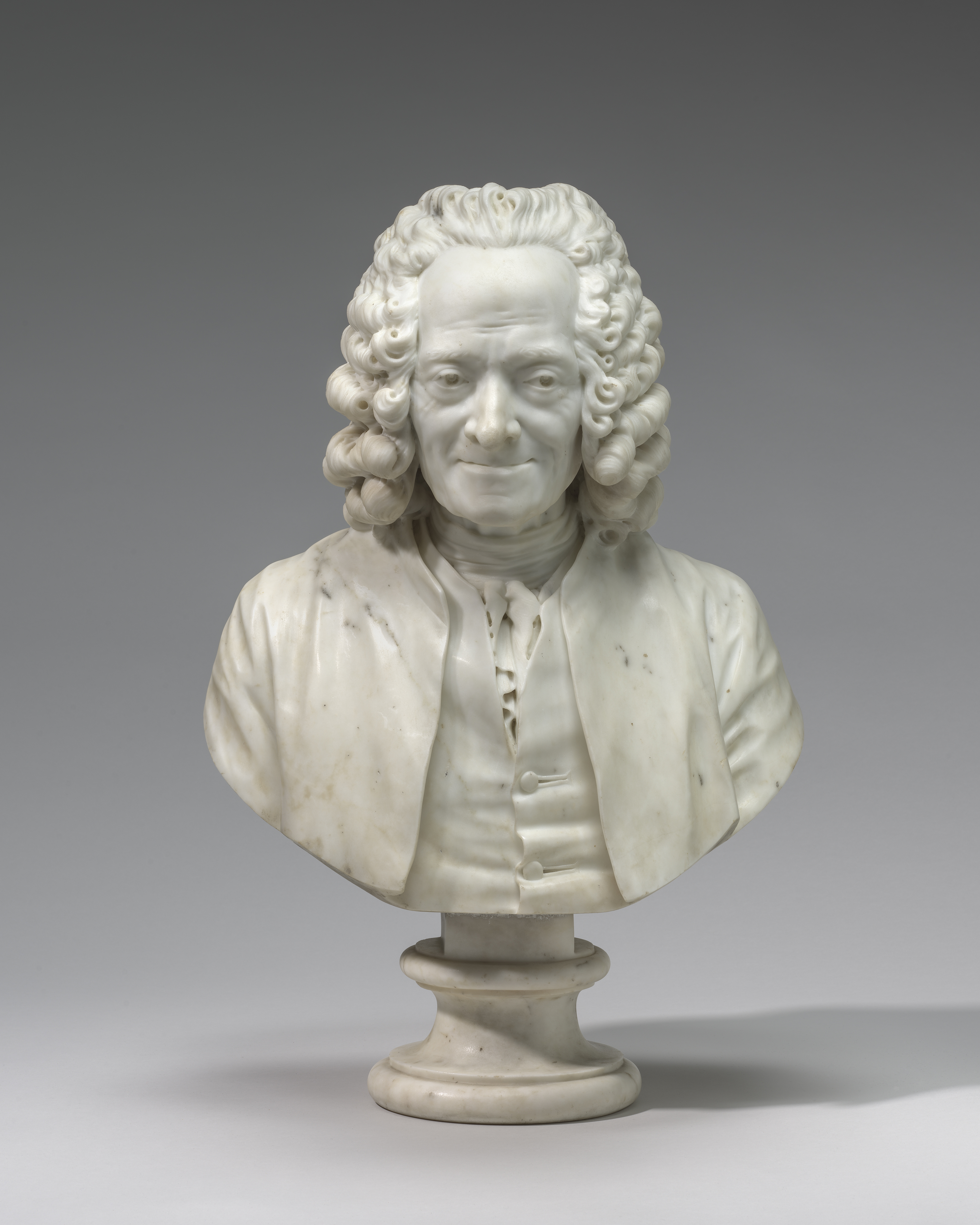
Voltaire, 1778, National Gallery of Art

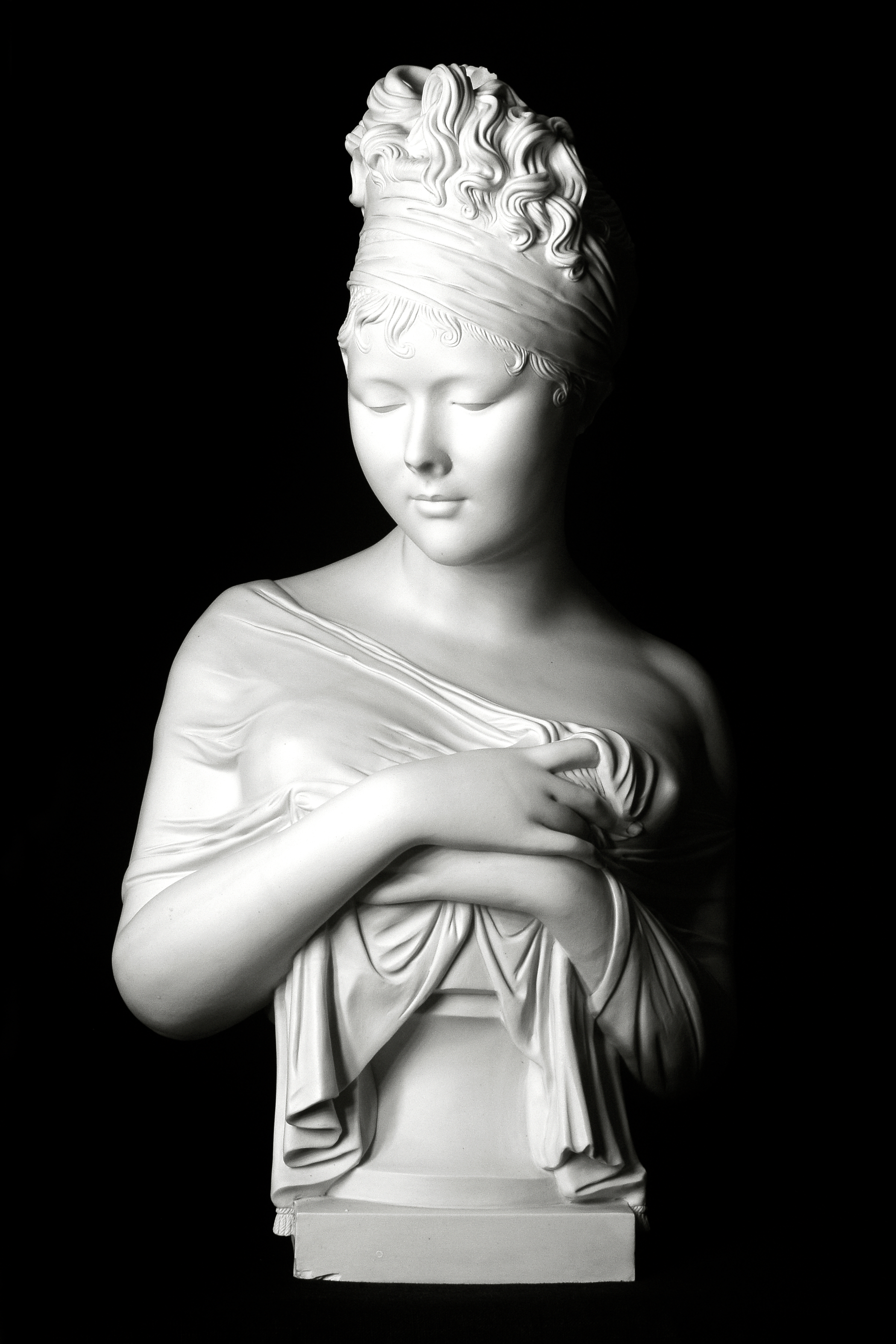
Bust of Madame Récamier after Joseph Chinard

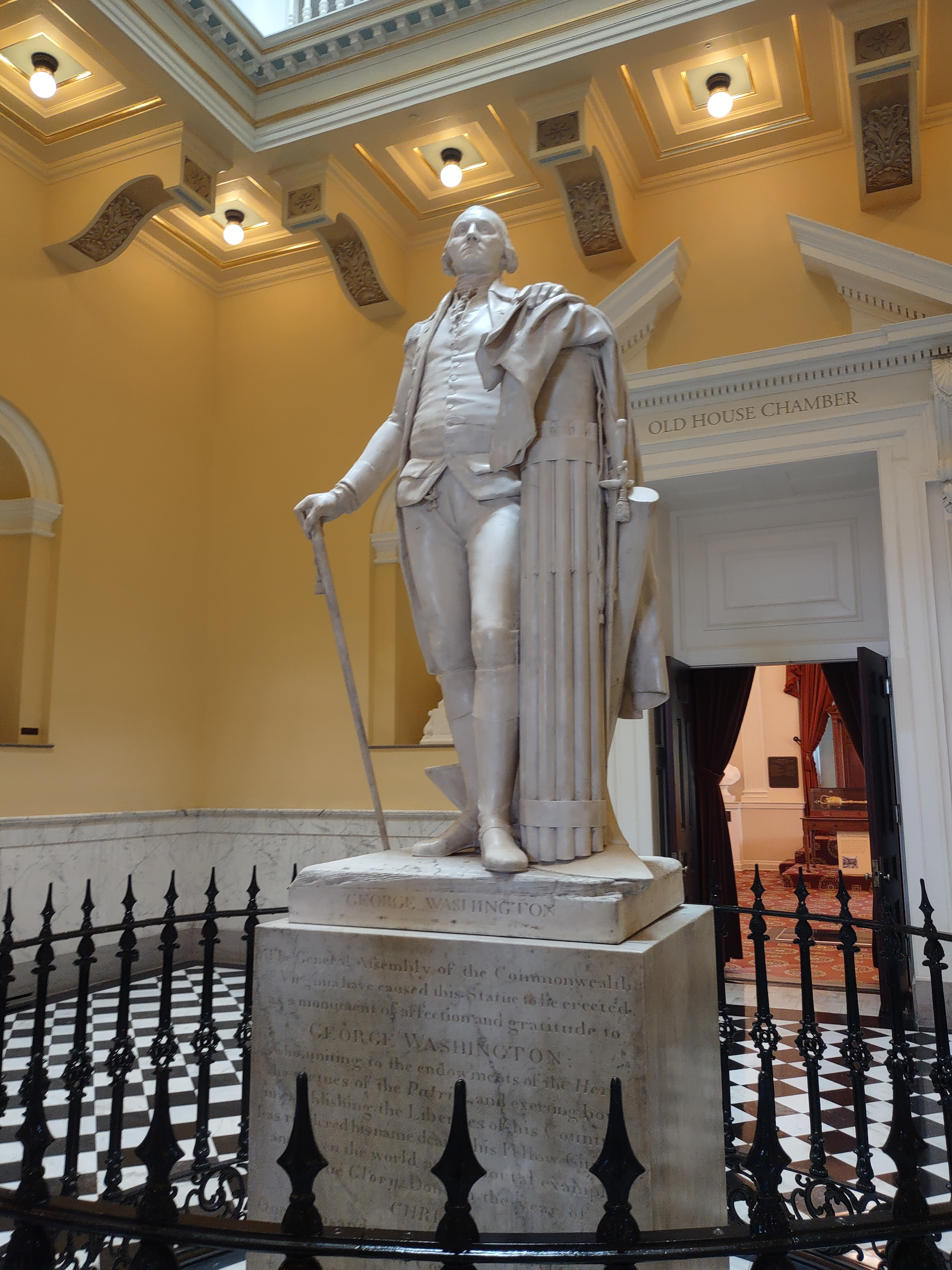
George Washington, Virginia State Capitol complex

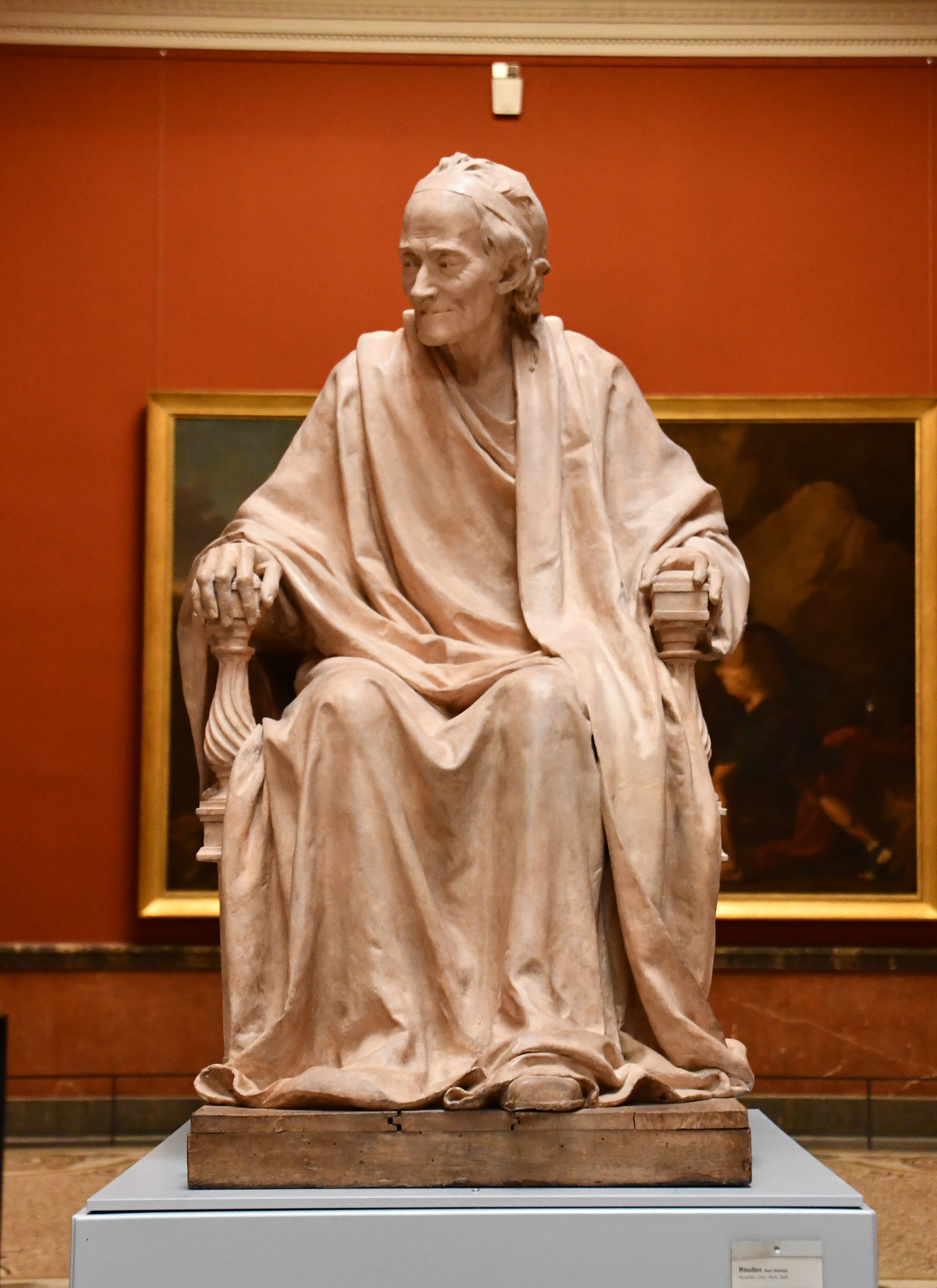
Seated Voltaire, Musée Fabre

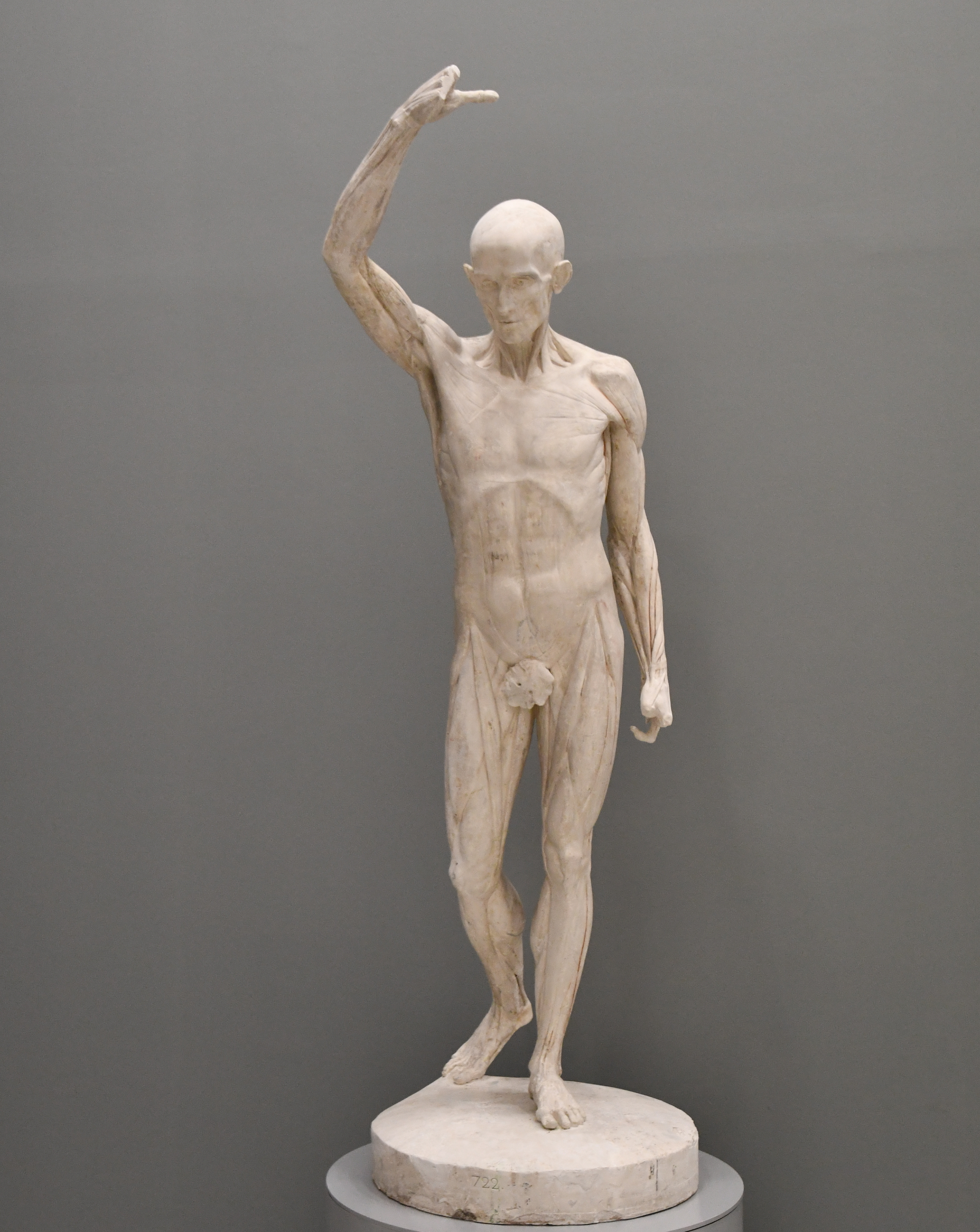
Skinned Man, Musée Fabre

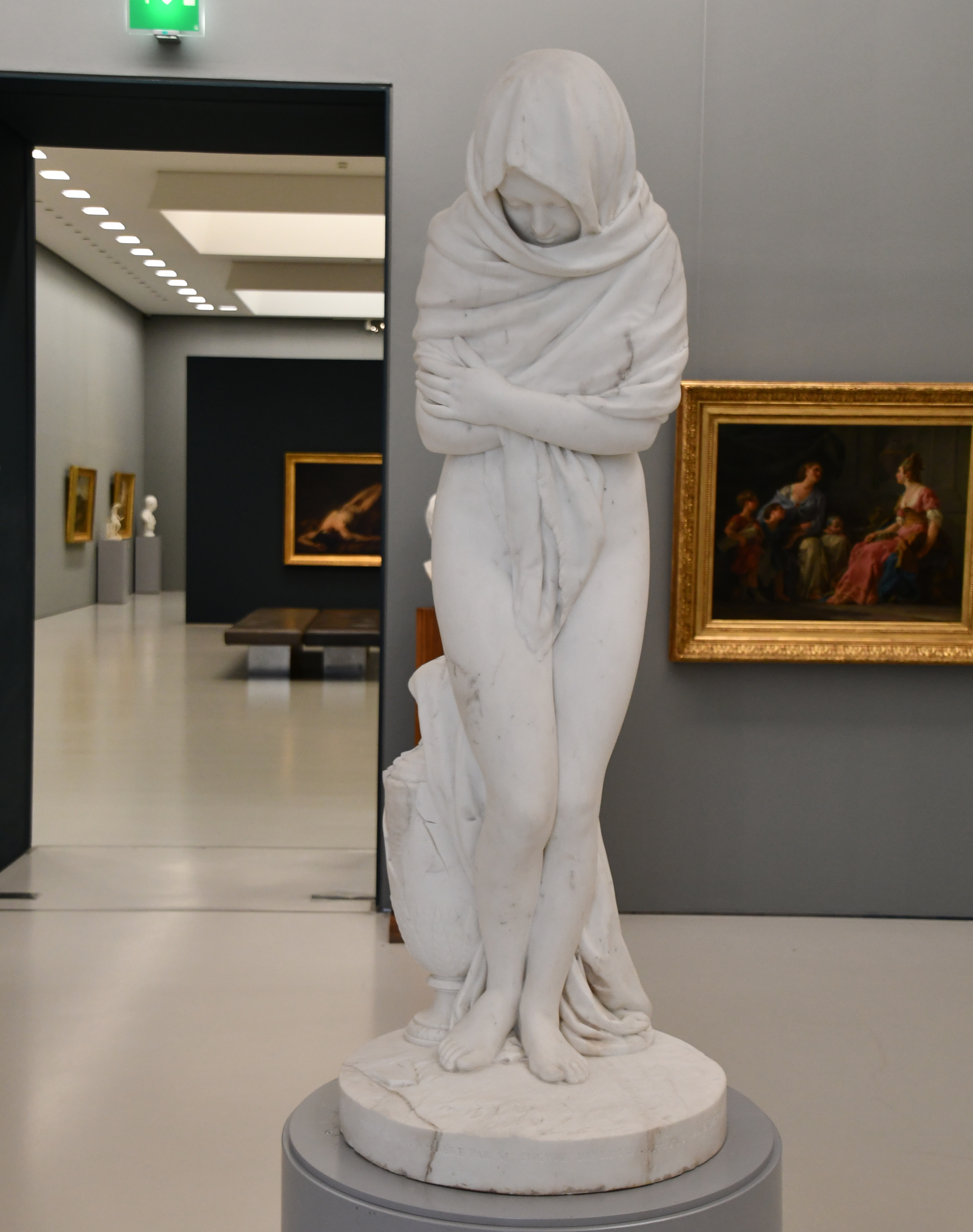
Winter, 1783, Musée Fabre

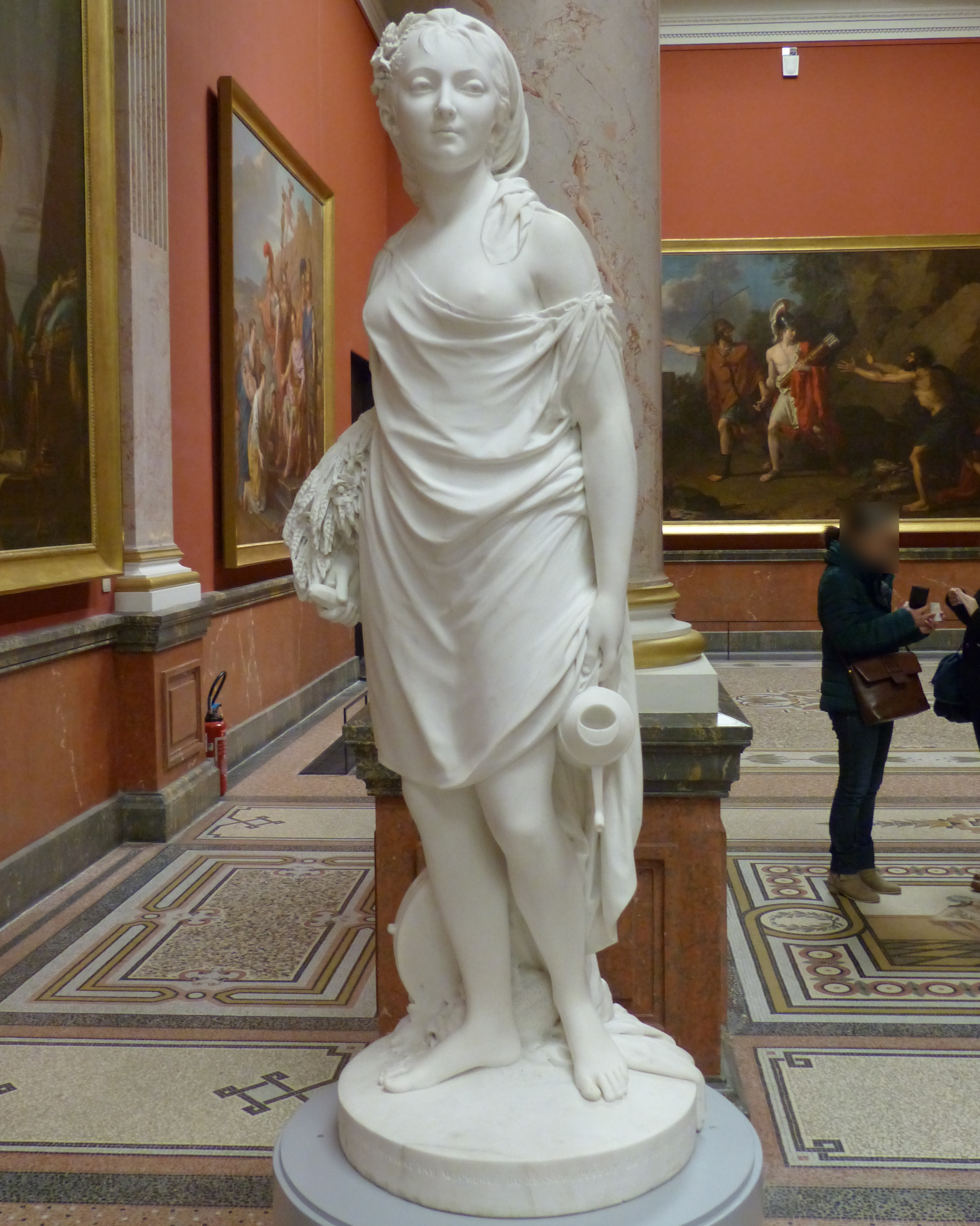
The Summer, 1785, Fabre Museum

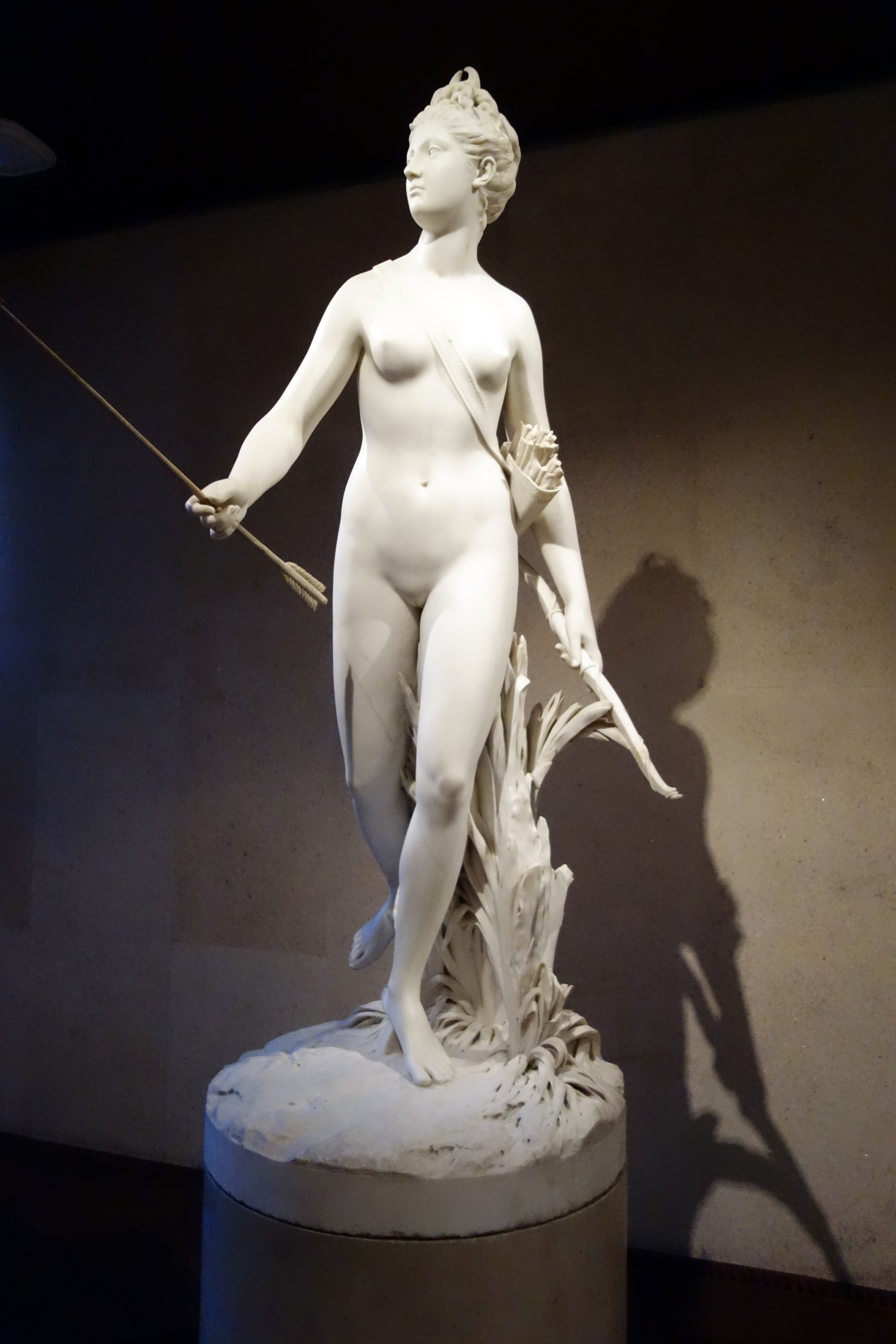
Diana, 1780, Calouste Gulbenkian Museum

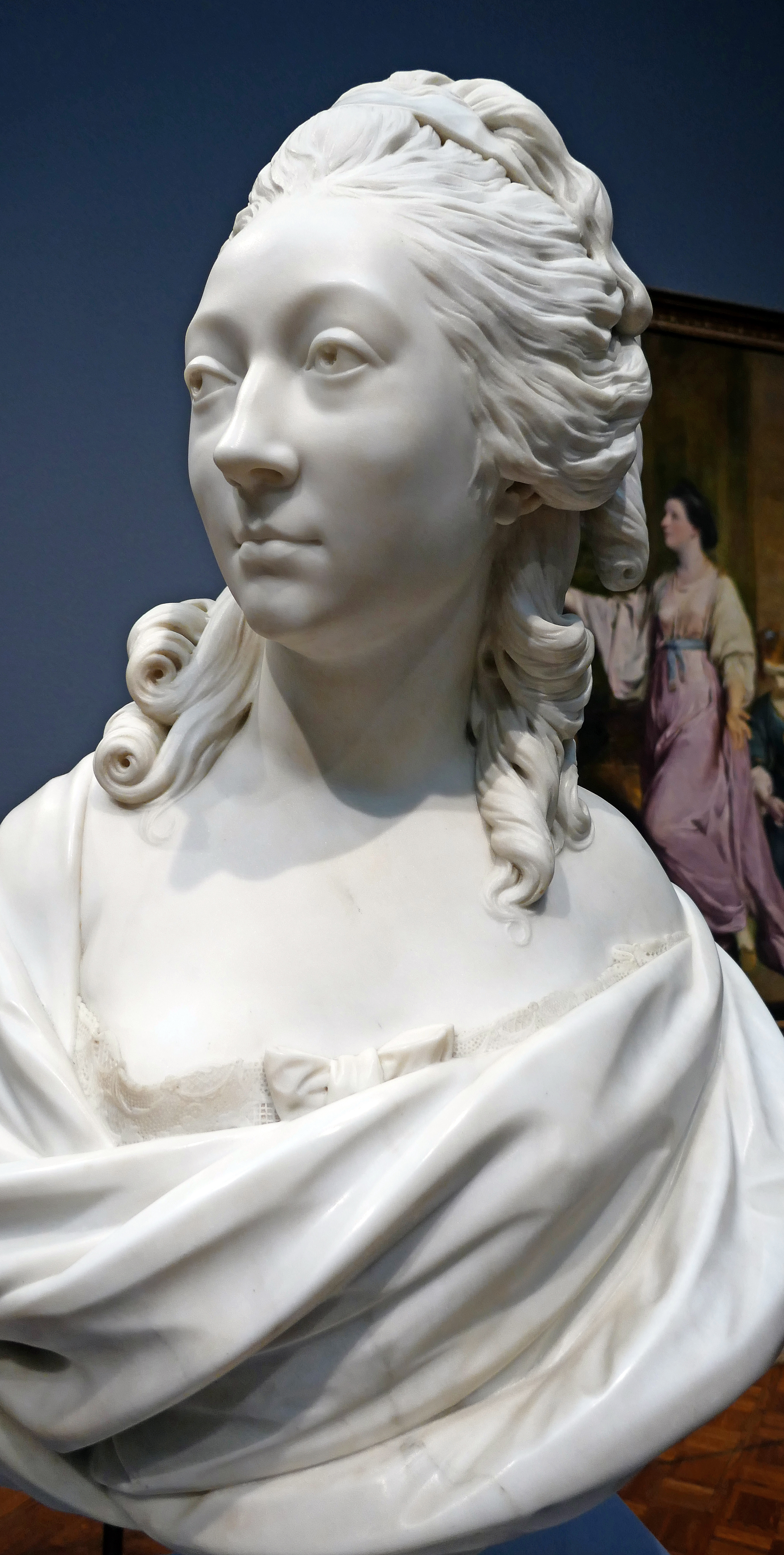
Bust of Anne-Marie-Louise Thomas de Domangeville de Sérilly, Comtesse de Pange (1780), Art Institute of Chicago

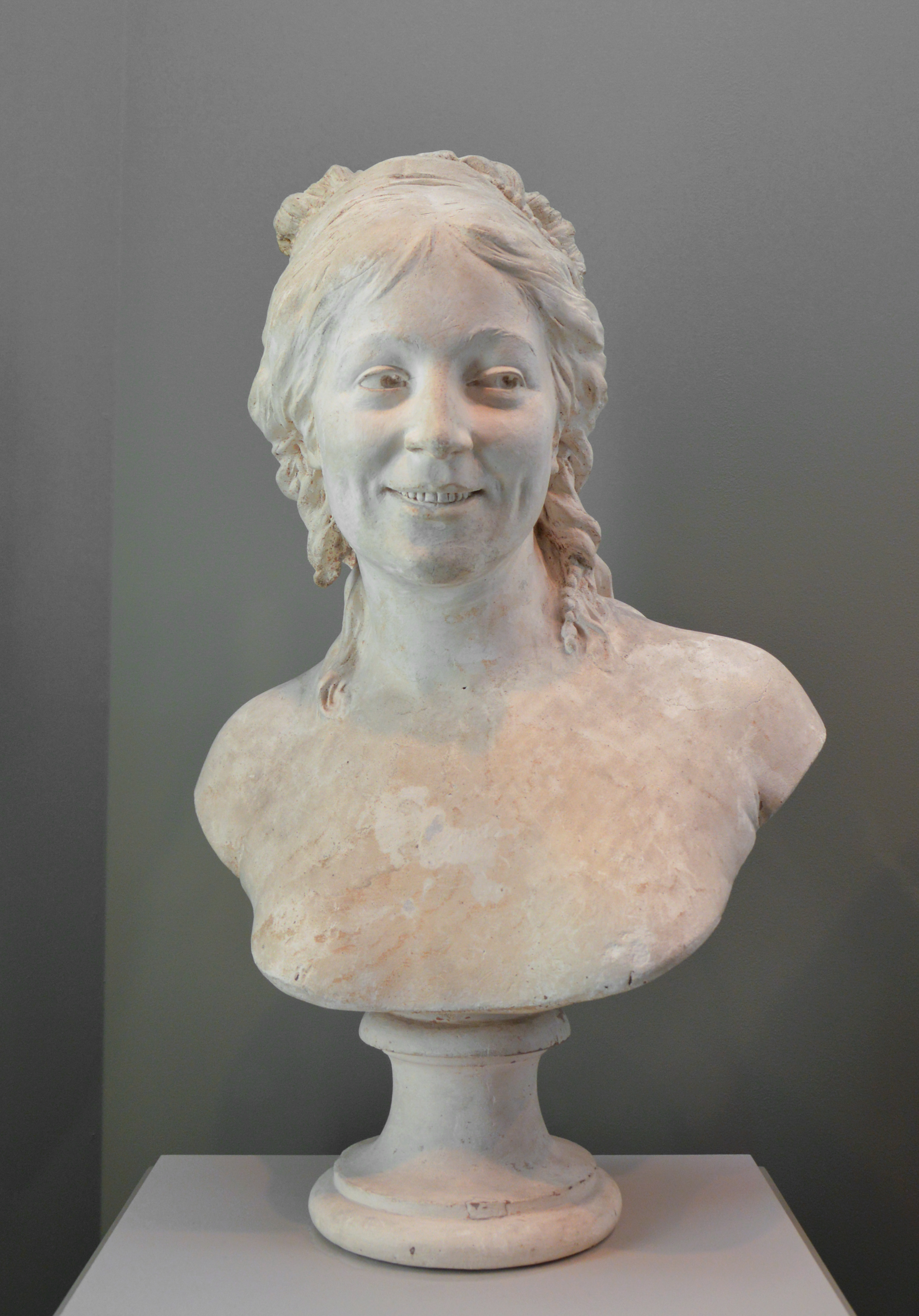
Madame Houdon, Louvre

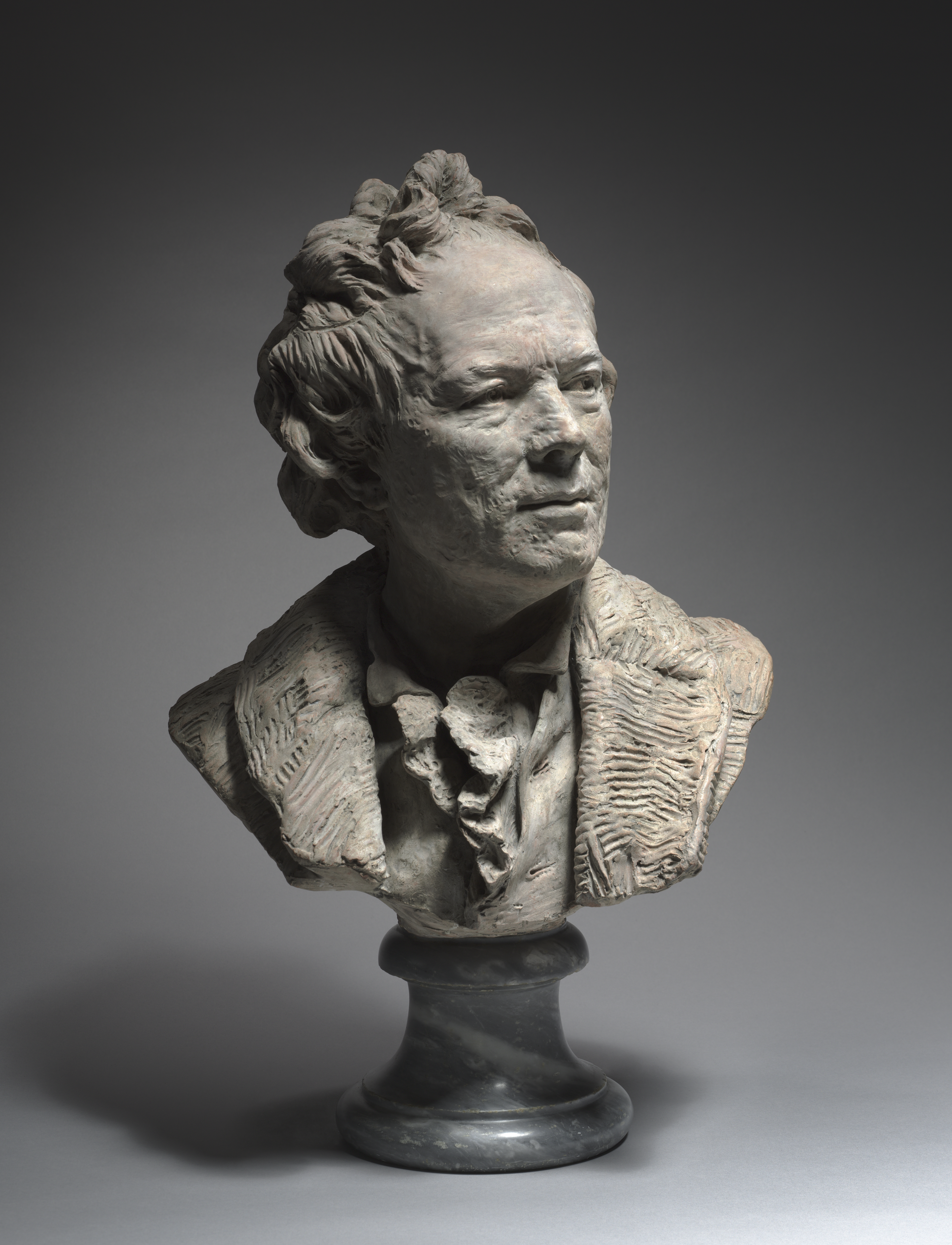
Bust of Christoph Willibald Gluck, Cleveland Museum of Art

== See also ==
- Neoclassicism in France
- Washington-Franklin Issues
- Tomb of the Unknown Revolutionary War Soldier
