= George Washington Middle School =

George Washington Middle School can refer to:

- George Washington Middle School (Texas)
- George Washington Middle School (Virginia)
- George Washington Middle School (New Jersey)

== See also ==
- Washington Middle School (disambiguation)
