= Prasanna =

Prasanna may refer to:

== People ==
=== As sole name ===
- Prasanna (actor) (Prasanna Venkatesan, active from 2001), Indian film actor
- Prasanna (theatre director) (born 1951), Indian theatre director and playwright
- V. V. Prasanna, a Tamil playback singer

=== As family name ===
- E. A. S. Prasanna (born 1940), Indian international cricketer
- Nivas K. Prasanna (born 1981), Indian film music composer
- R. Prasanna (born 1970), Indian Carnatic musician, better known as Guitar Prasanna
- Raghunath Prasanna (born 1913–99), classical Indian musician
- Rajendra Prasanna (born 1956), classical Indian musician
- Ramaswamy Prasanna (born 1982), Indian cricketer
- Rishab Prasanna (born 1985), classical Indian musician
- Seekkuge Prasanna (born 1985), Sri Lankan international cricketer

=== As given name ===
- Prasanna Alahakoon (born before 1987), Sri Lankan naval officer
- Prasanna Amarasekara (born 1981), Sri Lankan track and field athlete
- Prasanna Acharya (born 1949), Indian politician
- Prasanna Gunasena (active from 2010), Sri Lankan neurosurgeon
- Prasanna Gunawardena (active 2015), Sri Lankan politician
- Prasanna Jayawardene (born 1979), Sri Lankan international cricketer
- K. B. Prasanna Kumar (born 1968), Indian politician
- Gouri Prasanna Majumdar (1924–86), Indian lyricist for Bengali films
- Prasanna Pandian (born 1984), Indian artist, architect and animator
- Prasanna Kumar Patasani (born 1946), Indian lawyer, philosopher, poet and politician
- Debi Prasanna Pattanayak (born 1931), Indian academic, linguist, social scientist and author
- Prasanna Ranatunga (active 2009–15), Sri Lankan politician
- Prasanna Ranaweera (active from 2015), Sri Lankan politician
- Prasanna Kumar Roy (AKA Dr. P. K. Ray, 1849–1932), Indian educationist
- Prasanna Shamal Senarath (born before 1991), Sri Lankan politician
- Prasanna Kumar Tagore (1801–86), Indian lawyer, organiser and educator
- Prasanna Vithanage (born 1962), Sri Lankan filmmaker
- Eric Prasanna Weerawardena (born 1983), Sri Lankan politician
- Prasanna Wickramasuriya (active 1981–98), Sri Lankan soldier

== Places and buildings ==
- Prasanna Venkatachalapathi Temple, Thuraiyur, a Hindu temple in Tiruchirappalli district, India
- Prasanna Venkatachalapathy Temple, a Hindu temple near Trichy in the Indian state of Tamil Nadu
- Prasanna Venkatesa Perumal Temple, Saidapet, a Hindu temple in the Indian state of Tamil Nadu
- Prasanna Venkatesa Perumal Temple, Thanjavur, a Hindu temple in the Indian state of Tamil Nadu
- Prasanna Venkateswara Puram, a village in Chittoor District, Andhra Pradesh, India
- Prasanna Yoga Anjaneyar Temple, a Hindu temple in Chennai, India

== Other uses ==
- Prasanna (film), a 1950 Indian film in Malayalam
- Sree Lakshmi Prasanna Pictures, an Indian film production company established in 1982
