= Hanuman Temple =

Hanuman Temple may refer to these temples in India dedicated to the Hindu deity Hanuman:

- Hanuman Temple, Connaught Place, in Connaught Place, Delhi
- Hanuman Temple, Kedara-Gouri, in Kedara-Gouri, Bhubaneswar, Odisha
- Hanuman temple, Salangpur, in Sarangpur, Gujarat
- Hanuman Garhi Temple, in Uttar Pradesh
- Alattiyur Hanuman Temple, in Alathiyur, Malappuram, Kerala
- Shirsada Hanuman Temple, in Jalgaon, Maharashtra
- Khajuraho Hanuman inscription, in Khajuraho, Madhya Pradesh
- Prasanna Yoga Anjaneyar Temple, in Chennai, India; near the Madras Institute of Technology
- Sri Anjaneya Swamy Temple, Shamanur, in Shamanur, Karnataka

== See also ==
- Hanuman Mandir (disambiguation)
- Hanuman (disambiguation)
- Shri Hanuman Jakhu (statue), Hanuman statue in Shimla, India
- Hanuman Vatika, Hanuman statue of Rourkela, Orissa, India
- Sri Anjaneyar Kovil, Hanuman temple in Western Sri Lanka
- List of Hindu temples in India
