= Alahakoon =

Alahakoon is a surname. Notable people with the surname include:

- Jayatissa Alahakoon (1932–2019), Sri Lankan music director and composer
- Prasanna Alahakoon, Sri Lankan Navy officer and engineer
- Sujatha Alahakoon (born 1959), Sri Lankan politician
- Yasiru Rosapatakoon (born 2001), Sri Lankan QA engineer
