= Aana (disambiguation) =

Aana is a village in Lebanon.

Aana or AANA may also refer to:

- Aana Marutha, mythological figure, India
- Aani, an Egyptian deity
- American Association of Nurse Anesthesiology, the professional association
- Arthroscopy Association of North America, an accredited council
- Australian Association of National Advertisers, national body for advertisers

== See also ==
- A'ana, district, Samoa
- Anah, Iraqi town
