= Hanumantha =

Hanumantha is a given name. Notable people with the name include:

- Hanumantha Rao (several people)
- Hanumantha Lamani
- Hanumantha Muniappa Reddy
