= 孫悟空 =

孫悟空 or 孙悟空 may refer to:

- Sun Wukong or Monkey King, the main character in the classical Chinese epic novel Journey to the West
- Son Goku (disambiguation), the Japanese transliteration

== See also ==
- Wukong (disambiguation)
