= Monkey King (disambiguation) =

Monkey King, or Sun Wukong, is a main character in the classical Chinese epic novel Journey to the West. The novel was also translated as The Monkey King by George Theiner in 1964.

Monkey King may also refer to:

== Films and television series ==
- The Monkey King (TV miniseries), a 2001 American television mini-series
- The Monkey King: Quest for the Sutra, a 2002 Hong Kong and Taiwanese TV series
- The Monkey King (2014 film), a 2014 live action film
- Monkey King: Hero Is Back, 2015 Chinese film
- The Monkey King (2023 film), a 2023 Netflix animated film

== Others ==
- Monkey King (horse) (born 2002), New Zealand racehorse
- The Monkey King (Mo novel), a 1978 novel by Timothy Mo
- The Monkey King (manga), a 2002 dark fantasy manga series

== See also ==
- Wukong (disambiguation)
- Journey to the West (disambiguation)
- Hanuman (disambiguation)
- The Monkey King's Daughter, a young adult novel series by T. A. DeBonis
- The New Legends of Monkey, a homage to the TV series Monkey
