= Kannan Rajarathinam =

Indian writer

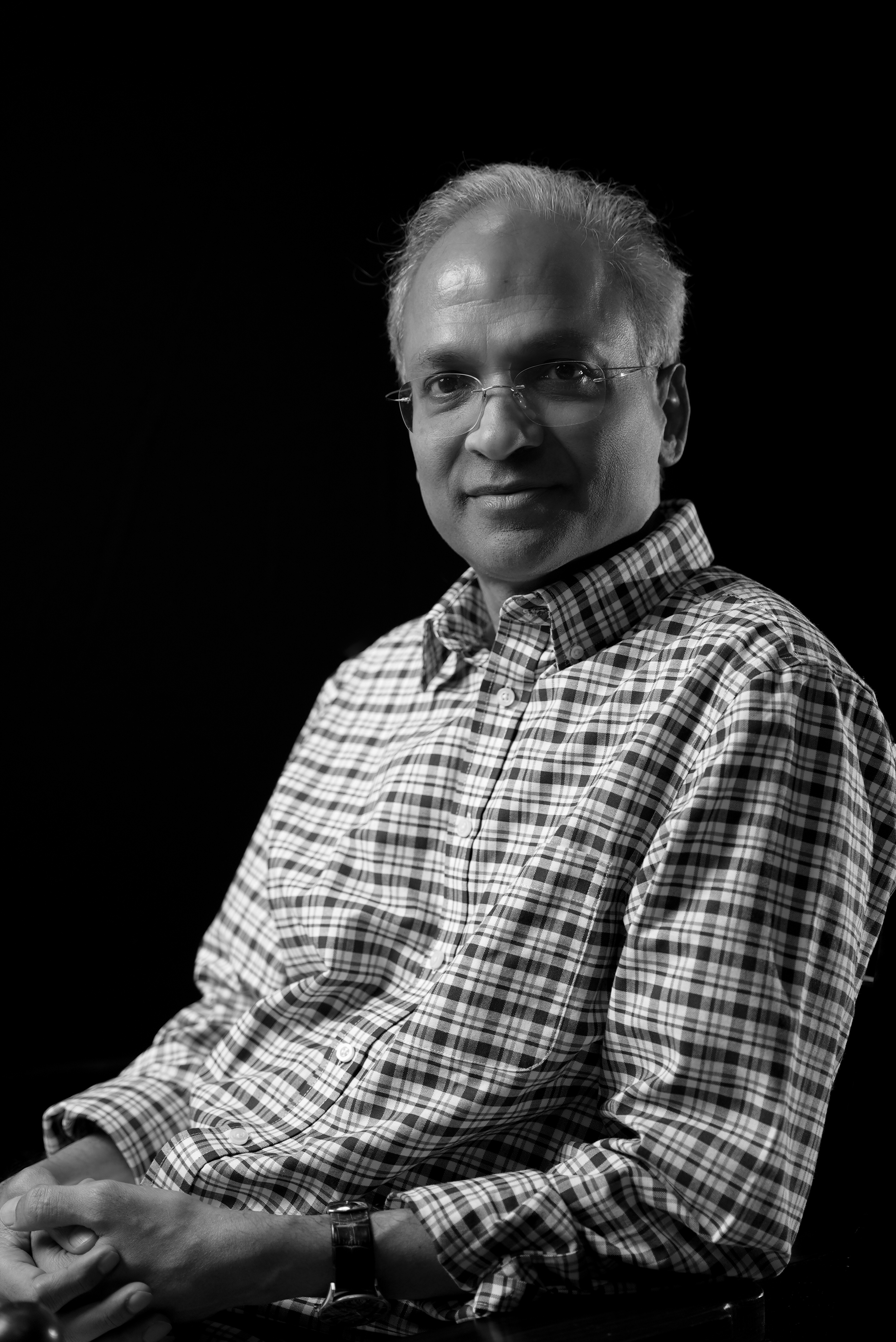
- Kannan Rajarathinam in 2024
- Born: 23 August 1962 (age 64); Chennai, India
- Citizenship: India
- Education: University of Georgia; Tufts University; Madras Law College; New College, Chennai
- Occupations: Writer; Diplomat; Teacher
- Known for: Writing about Tamil leaders and working with the United Nations
- Children: 2

Kannan Rajarathinam (born 23 August 1962) is an Indian writer, commentator, academic, and former United Nations officer. He held positions in peacekeeping missions across Europe, the Middle East, and Africa. He wrote biographies of Tamil Nadu political figures including C. N. Annadurai and M. G. Ramachandran. He is an adjunct faculty member at the University of Georgia School of Law.

== Early life and education ==
Kannan was born in Chennai, Tamil Nadu. He completed his BSc from New College, Chennai and obtained a law degree from Madras Law College. He later pursued an LL.M. at the University of Georgia and a doctorate in international relations from The Fletcher School of Law and Diplomacy at Tufts University.

== Career ==
Kannan began his career with the United Nations in 1993, working in civil affairs during the UNPROFOR peacekeeping mission in Croatia, and went on to become the head of civil affairs in Cyprus and a senior political officer in Darfur/Sudan. He later served in various roles in Bosnia and Herzegovina, Kosovo, Cyprus, Iraq, Afghanistan, Somalia, North Macedonia, and Sudan.

In Cyprus, he was responsible for coordinating civilian projects in the UN buffer zone. During his tenure, he facilitated access to religious sites, including reopening a Greek Orthodox church for worship after a 30-year closure.

== Writing ==
Kannan has contributed opinion essays to The Hindu, Times of India, The News Minute, and Hindustan Times, covering Indian politics and international affairs.

His first book, Anna: The Life and Times of C.N. Annadurai (2010), was published by Penguin Random House. It was followed by MGR: A Life (2017), a critical biography of actor-turned-politician M. G. Ramachandran. In 2024, he authored The DMK Years, analyzing the history of the Dravida Munnetra Kazhagam political party.

- Anna: The Life and Times of C.N. Annadurai (2010)
- MGR: A Life (2017)

As for MGR's political career presented by Kannan, reviewer K. Venkataramanan had critically observed, '[MGR's] three successive stints as chief minister can be seen as sketchy. As this part is narrated mainly through public events and major political developments, the reader does not get a full insight into the functioning of MGR as an administrator.'

- The DMK Years (2024)

B. Kolappan, reviewing 'The DMK Years' for the Hindu newspaper had complimented Kannan's even handedness on his chosen theme for not suffering from any ambivalence towards his chosen subject. To quote Kolappan, author Kannan 'minces no words while pointing out the failures of the DMK and Karunanidhi even as he highlights the strengths and achievements of the party and its (long time) leader."
