= Saiyuki =

Saiyuki (西遊記, Saiyūki) may refer to:

- Saiyūki, the Japanese language title of the Chinese classic Journey to the West
- Saiyūki, a 1960 anime film based on Osamu Tezuka's manga adaptation of Journey to the West titled Boku no Son Goku, released in English as Alakazam the Great
- Saiyūki, a 1978–1980 television drama based on Journey to the West, released in English as Monkey
- Saiyuki (manga), a 1997–2002 manga based on Journey to the West more commonly referred to as Gensomaden Saiyuki
- Saiyūki, a 1999 Japanese role-playing video game released in North America in 2001 as Saiyuki: Journey West
- Saiyūki (TV series), a 2006 Japanese television drama based on Journey to the West featuring the members of boy band SMAP

== See also ==
- Journey to the West (disambiguation)
- Travels to the West of Qiu Chang Chun
