= Hanuman Mandir =

Hanuman Mandir may refer to these Hindu mandirs (temples) dedicated to the Hindu deity Hanuman in India:

- Hanuman Temple, Connaught Place, New Delhi
- Mahavir Mandir, in Patna, Bihar
- Shri Hanuman Mandir, Sarangpur, in Gujarat

== See also ==
- Hanuman Temple (disambiguation)
- Hanuman (disambiguation)
- Shri Hanuman Mandir Dharamshala, a school in Jalgaon, West Bengal, India
