= Hanuman (disambiguation) =

Hanuman is a Hindu god and one of the most important characters in the Indian epic Ramayana.

Hanuman may also refer to:

- Hanuman (name)
- Hanuman (1998 film), an English film
- Hanuman (2005 film), an Indian animated feature film
  - Return of Hanuman, a 2007 sequel to the 2005 animated movie
  - Hanuman: Da' Damdaar, a 2017 Indian animated film
- Hanu-Man, a 2024 Indian Telugu-language superhero film
  - Hanu-Man (soundtrack), a 2024 soundtrack album to the Indian Telugu-language film Hanu-Man
- Hanuman.com, a 2013 Indian Bengali-language action thriller film by Gaurabh Pandey
- Bhaktha Hanuman, a 1980 Indian film
- Shri Hanuman Chalisa, a 2013 Indian film
- Anjaneya (film), a 2003 Indian Tamil-language film by N. Maharajan starring Ajith Kumar
- Sri Anjaneyam, a 2004 Indian film
- Anjani Putra (film), 2017 Indian vigilante action film by Harsha
- Bajrangbali (film), 1976 Indian film
- Hanuman langur (Semnopithecus entellus), a species of Old World monkey
- Hanumana, Rewa, a town in Rewa district, Madhya Pradesh, India
- Raj Hamsa X-Air "H" Hanuman ultralight aircraft by Raj Hamsa Ultralights
- Sankat Mochan Hanumaan, an Indian mythological television series
- Sankatmochan Mahabali Hanuman, an Indian mythological television series
- Hanuman (SEA Games mascot), an official mascot of the 1997 SEA Games in Jakarta
- Hanumankind (born 1992), Indian rapper

== See also ==
- Hanuman Temple (disambiguation)
- Hanuman Mandir (disambiguation)
- Jai Hanuman (disambiguation)
- Hanumantha Rao (disambiguation)
- Hanumanthanagar (disambiguation)
- Mahavira (disambiguation)
- Mahabali (disambiguation)
- Maruti (disambiguation)
- Anjaneyulu (disambiguation)
- Monkey King (disambiguation)
- Anuman, a French video game developer
