= Marutha =

Marutha may refer to:

- Marutha, India, a village in Nilambur taluk of Malappuram district
- Marutha of Tikrit (565–649), West Syrian Maphrian
- Aana Marutha, a mythological evil spirit popular in Kerala, India
- Marutha (2022 film), an Indian Tamil-language film
- Marutha (2025 film), an Indian Kannada-language action thriller film

== See also ==
- Maruta (disambiguation)
- Maruthas, 5th-century Christian saint and bishop of Martyropolis
