= A. S. Munavar Basha =

Indian politician

- Born: 5 February 1954 (age 72)

A. S. Munavar Basha (born 5 February 1954, Mylapore, Chennai) is an Indian Politician and a social worker. He is currently the General Secretary of Tamil Maanila Congress.

Basha contested as a Tamil Maanila Congress candidate for Mylapore constituency in the 2016 Tamil Nadu Legislative Assembly election.

He was educated at the Santhome Higher Secondary School, Mylapore, and graduated from The New College, Chennai. Munavar Basha was the student union leader in New College.

Munavar Basha is an orator, writer and a social worker. He is the founder and president of Annai Ullam, an old age home in Kodambakkam.

== Political life ==
Munavar Basha was inspired by the Perunthalaivar K. Kamaraj. During his schooldays, he attended many Kamarajar meetings with his father Abdul Samad, inspired by Kamarajar and eventually joined the student congress in 1974. Since then he has been a congress person.

=== Positions held (1974–2016) ===
Munavar Basha has held the following positions:

- 1974–1977 – President, District Student Congress
- 1977–1978 – State General Secretary, Student Congress
- 1978–1981 – President, District Youth Congress
- 1984–1987 – State Secretary, Tamil Nadu, Indian National Congress
- 1996–2001 – State Secretary, Tamil Nadu Tamil Maanila Congress
- 2001–2014 – Tamil Maanila Congress Merged with Congress, state working committee member. During this time, Munavar Basha had the following roles
- Railway Recruitment Board Member
- Railway User Committee Member
- Film Censor Board Member
- National Shipping Board Member
- 2014–2016 – General Secretary, Tamil Maanila Congress

== Other activities ==
1. Started and managed Annai Illam in Mylapore for 15 years
2. Currently runs Annai Ullam Old age home in Kodambakkam.
3. Fought for P.S. Higher Secondary School Mylapore not to change as a matriculation school which will impact the poor children getting good education for less fee.
4. Fought for Poorana Madhu Vilakku in Tamil Nadu
5. In 1980s, when the current C.M. Jayalalitha was attacked in the assembly, A.S. Munavar Basha opposed attacking a woman and challenged those who tried to conceal that anything happened. He led a protest to release the assembly video as of what happened.
6. Munavar Basha wrote a letter to Karunanidhi, who was the Chief Minister at that period, requesting to name the flyover in Chamiers Road in memory of the leader, G.K Moopanar. Accepting his Request, the flyover was named as G.K.Moopanar Flyover
7. Organises several blood donation camps in Mylapore
