= Maruta =

Maruta may refer to:

- Cătălin Măruță (born 1978), Romanian TV host
- Hinata Maruta (born 1997), Japanese boxer
- Maruta Gardner (1947–2016), American community activist and public school administrator
- A grindcore/death metal band that includes drummer Nick Augusto
- A program of experimentation on human beings at the Imperial Japanese Army's Unit 731
- Marutas, wind or storm deities in Hinduism

== See also ==
- Marutha (disambiguation)
- Marut (disambiguation)
- Maruti (disambiguation), an epithet of the Hindu god Hanuman, as the son the wind deity Maruta
