= Jai Hanuman =

Jai Hanuman may refer to these Indian Hindu mythological TV series and films:

- Jai Hanuman (1997 TV series)
- Jai Hanuman (2018 TV series)
- Jai Hanuman – Sankatmochan Naam Tiharo (2022 TV series)
- Jai Hanuman (film), upcoming Indian Telugu-language film, a sequel to Hanu-Man

== See also ==
- Hanuman (disambiguation)
