= Anjaneyulu =

Anjaneyulu is an Indian name based on the Hindu god Hanuman or Anjaneya, meaning son of Añjanā.

Anjaneyulu may also refer to:

- Anjaneyulu (film), 2009 Telugu film
- Chilakalapudi Seetha Rama Anjaneyulu (1907–1963), Telugu actor
- Kundurti Anjaneyulu (1922–1982), Telugu poet
- Sitarama Anjaneyulu, the birth name of Sri Bharati Tirtha

== See also ==
- Hanuman (disambiguation)
