= Wukong (disambiguation) =

Wukong is Sun Wukong, the Monkey King in Chinese mythology.

Wukong may also refer to:

== Named after Sun Wukong ==
- Dark Matter Particle Explorer, also known as Wukong, a Chinese satellite
- Sun Wukong Fossa, a fossa on Pluto
- Typhoon Wukong (disambiguation)
- Sun Wukong, fictional character from RWBY (see List of RWBY characters)
- Wukong, a playable character from Warframe
- Wu Kong (film), a 2017 Chinese film
- Black Myth: Wukong, a 2024 video game by Game Science

== Other ==
- Wukong (monk) (635–713), Chinese Buddhist monk

== See also ==
- Monkey King (disambiguation)
- Goku
- Journey to the West (disambiguation)
