= Maruti =

Māruti may refer to:

- Hanuman or Maruti, a Hindu god, son of the wind deity Maruta
- Maruti Suzuki, an Indian automobile manufacturer
- Maruti Indian Restaurant, Portland, Oregon US
- Maruti (cultivar), a pea cultivar developed from a landrace crop

== See also ==
- Marut (disambiguation)
- Maruta (disambiguation)
- Hanuman (disambiguation)
