= Mahavira (disambiguation) =

Mahavira may refer to:

- Mahavira (599–527 BCE), 24th and last Jain Tirthankara (enlightened reformer) in the current avsarpini (cosmological cycle of Jainism); a contemporary of the Buddha and considered to be the historical founder of Jainism
- Another name for Hanuman, Hindu god, devotee of Rama in the Indian epic Ramayana
- Mahāvīra (mathematician), 9th-century Indian Jain mathematician
- Mahavira Hall, main hall of a Buddhist temple in China, Korea and Vietnam
- Mahaveera (film), 1988 Indian film
- Mahavira: The Hero of Nonviolence, a book about the founder of Jainism
- Shri Mahaveer Ji (town), a town and pilgrimage centre in Rajasthan, India
  - Shri Mahaveer Ji temple, a Mahavira Jain temple in the town

== See also ==
- Maaveeran (disambiguation)
- Hanuman (disambiguation)
- Mahavir Janma Kalyanak, day celebrating the birth of Mahavira
- Mahaveera Moksha Kalyan, day celebrating the enlightenment of Mahavira, coinciding with Diwali
- Mahaveeryar, 2022 Indian fantasy drama film by Abrid Shine
- Mahaveera Bheeman, a 1962 Indian film
