= Westward Journey =

Westward Journey may refer to:

- The Westward Journey, sculpture group on the Indiana Statehouse, USA
- Westward Journey, a series of computer games
  - Fantasy Westward Journey
  - Westward Journey Online II
- Westward Journey Nickel Series, American coins
- Journey to the West, in Chinese literature
