= Herman Carl Mueller =

American ceramicist

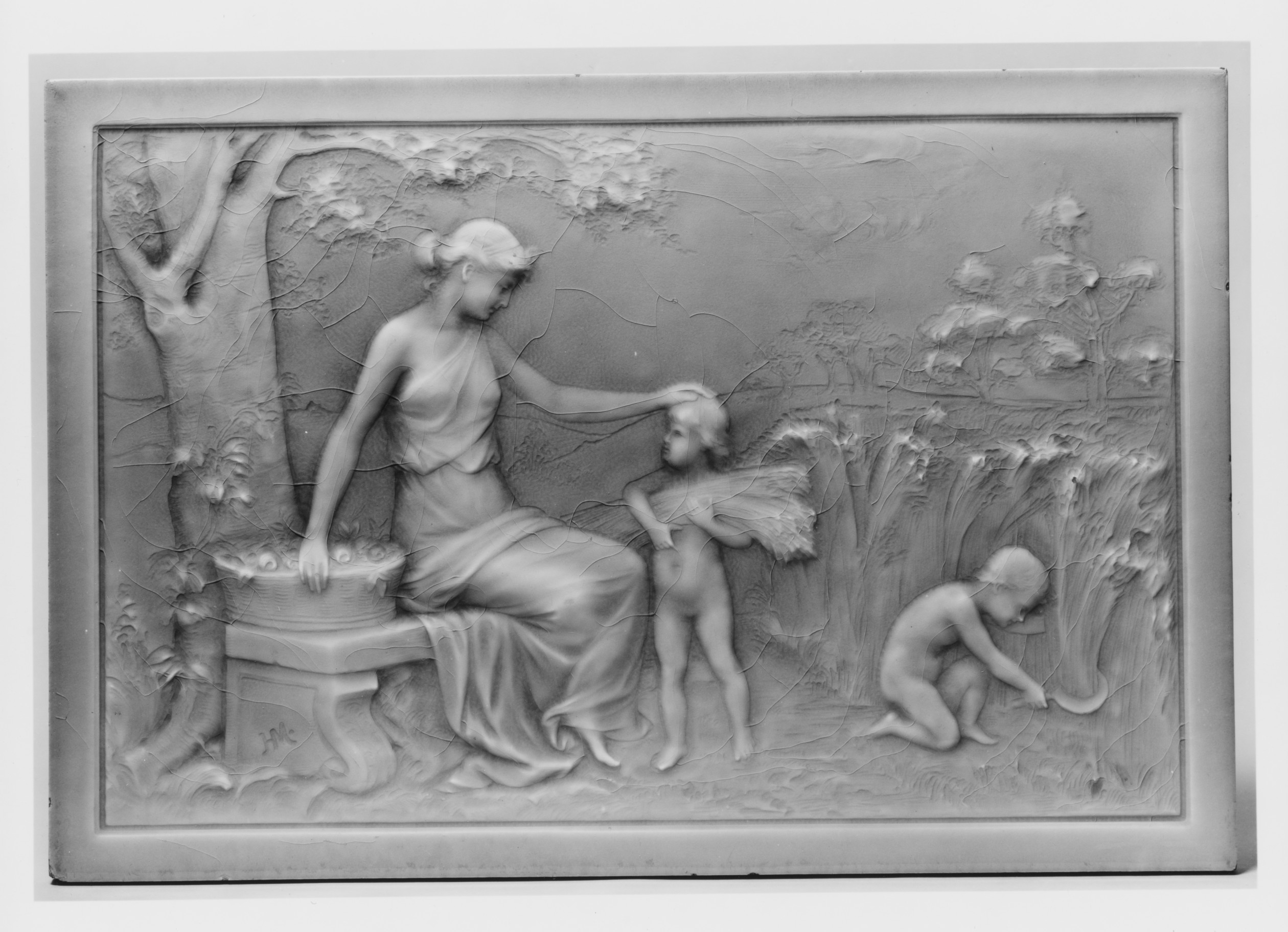
- Tile, by Herman Carl Mueller
- Born: 1854; Germany
- Died: 1941 (aged 86–87)
- Occupation: Potter
- Known for: Faience Tile

Herman Carl Mueller (1854 – September 22, 1941), was an American ceramicist. He was the founder of the Mueller Mosaic Company of Trenton.

Museums holding his work include the New Jersey State Museum, Newark Museum, Brooklyn Museum, Smithsonian Institution, and the Metropolitan Museum of Art where his work is on view in gallery 774.

The Westward Journey, one of Muellers earlier works, is a collection of limestone sculptures that form part of the Indiana Statehouse.

Mueller's tile work can also be found at Columbia High School (New Jersey) in Maplewood, New Jersey, Hepburn Hall at New Jersey City University, New Jersey State House, Trenton and Mercer County War Memorial-Soldiers' and Sailors' Memorial Building.

Mueller received the John Scott Award from the Franklin Institute of Philadelphia for "Process of and apparatus for manufacturing mosaics".

== Biography ==
Herman Carl Mueller was born in 1854 to Elias and Doretta Mueller, in Rodach Germany, near Saxe-Coburg. After attending the Nuremberg School of Industrial Arts, he studied sculpture at the Munich Academy of Fine Arts. In 1878, Muller moved to Cincinnati Ohio where he worked as a sculptor. After a few short business venture, Mueller was commissioned to create nine figures for the Indiana Statehouse. While in the employ of American Encaustic Tiling Company, Mueller met Karl Langenbeck with whom he founded the Mosaic Tile Company.
