= Hanuman (name) =

Hanuman is an Indian name that may refer to

- Guru Hanuman (1901–1999), Indian wrestling coach
- Hanuman Prasad, Indian politician
- Hanuman Singh, Indian basketball player
- Hanuman Singh Budania, Indian social worker and freedom fighter
