= Journey to the West (disambiguation) =

Journey to the West is one of the Four Great Classical Novels of Chinese literature attributed to Wu Cheng'en.

Journey to the West may also refer to:

== Television ==
- Monkey (TV series) or Journey to the West, a 70's Japanese television drama based on the Chinese novel Journey to the West, by Wu Cheng'en
- Journey to the West (1986 TV series), two-season Chinese television series produced by CCTV, released in the 1980s and 1998
- Journey to the West (1996 TV series), Hong Kong television series produced by TVB
  - Journey to the West II, a 1998 sequel to the 1996 television series.
- Journey to the West: Legends of the Monkey King, a 1999 animated series
- Wu Cheng'en and Journey to the West, a 2010 Chinese television series
- Journey to the West (2010 TV series), Chinese television series commonly referred to as the "Zhejiang version" to avoid confusion with the 2011 television series
- Journey to the West (2011 TV series), Chinese television series produced by Zhang Jizhong

== Film ==
- Journey to the West: Conquering the Demons, a 2013 Chinese film by Stephen Chow
- Journey to the West (2014 film), a French-Taiwanese film
- Journey to the West: The Demons Strike Back, 2017 sequel also by Stephen Chow
- Journey to the West (2021 film), a Chinese film

== Other uses ==
- Journey to the West (Siyouji), a Chinese novel, part of the Ming dynasty Four Journeys (Siyouji); a variant of Journey to the West
- Monkey: Journey to the West, a stage adaptation
  - Journey to the West (album), the soundtrack to the stage adaptation

== See also ==
- Westward Journey (disambiguation)
- A Supplement to the Journey to the West, 1640 Chinese novel that acts as an addendum to the original work
- New Journey to the West, 2015 South Korean travel reality show
- Saiyuki (disambiguation)
- List of media adaptations of Journey to the West
- Great Tang Records on the Western Regions, travelogue of the Buddhist monk Xuanzang's journey to India, the basis for the novel
- Travels to the West of Qiu Chang Chun, another travelogue of the Taoist monk Qiu Chuji
- Four Journeys, a collection that includes an abridged version of Journey to the West
- Journey to the East (disambiguation)
