= Maaveeran =

Maaveeran (transl. Great warrior) may refer to:

- Maaveeran (1986 film), a 1986 Indian Tamil-language film
- Maaveeran (2011 film), Tamil dub of the 2009 Indian Telugu-language film Magadheera
- Maaveeran (2023 film), a 2023 Indian Tamil-language film

== See also ==
- Mahavira (disambiguation)
- Maveeran Alagumuthu Kone (1728–1759), Indian rebel
- Maaveeran Kittu, a 2011 Indian Tamil-language film
