= Hanumanthanagar =

Hanumanthanagar may refer to these places in Karnataka, India:

- Hanumanthanagar, Bengaluru, a locality in Bangalore, India
- Hanumanthanagar, Mysuru, a locality in Mysore, India
- Hanumanthanagar, Kolar Gold Fields, Kolar district, India

== See also ==
- Hanuman (disambiguation)
