= Marut =

Marut may refer to:

- Harut and Marut, angels that were sent to Babylon, in Islam
- Maruts, storm deities, sons of Kashyapa and Diti or Rudra and Prisni and attendants of Indra, in Hinduism
- HAL HF-24 Marut, the Hindustan Aeronautics HF-24 Marut
- Măruț, a tributary of the Iara in Romania
- Ret Marut, pseudonym of writer B. Traven (1882–1969)

== See also ==
- Maruta (disambiguation)
- Maruti (disambiguation), an epithet of the Hindu god Hanuman, as the son the wind deity Maruta
