= Hanuman Prasad =

Indian politician

Hanuman Prasad is an Indian politician. He was a Member of Legislative Assembly from Surajgarh constituency in Rajasthan. leader of Indian National Congress.

== Career ==
Hanuman Prasad is a retired Indian Administrative Service (IAS) officer and former Chairman of Rajasthan Public Service Commission. He is an Ex- Pramukh of Jhunjhunu zila prishad and former Chairman of State SC Commission.
