= Muslim Educational Association of Southern India =

The Muslim Educational Association of Southern India (MEASI), formerly Madras Executive Committee of Mohamedan Educational Conference and Mohamedan Educational Association of Southern India, is a trust which strives for education among Muslim youth, especially from South India.

== Establishment ==
The Association, established in 1902 by Muslims, was registered under the societies act XXI of 1860. It was founded as a fulfillment of the dream of Sir Syed Ahmed Khan after the annual session of Muslim Education Conference held in Madras on 28 December 1901. This conference renamed the then existing Madras Executive Committee of Mohamedan Educational Conference as the Mohamedan Educational Association of Southern India, which later came to be known as Muslim Educational Association of Southern India. The founding members of MEASI are

- Hamid Hassan Sait Sahib
- Nawab Syed Mohamed (Grand son of Tipu Sultan)
- Justice Sir Abdul Rahim
- Sir Mohamed Habibullah
- Jamal Mohamed Rowther
- Sir Mohamed Usman
- Malang Ahmed Batcha
- Quaid-E-Millath Muhammad Ismail Rowther

== Function ==
The Association is one of the oldest minority educational institutions and is having a multi-level educational system ranging from school to Post Graduate and Research, covering several fields of studies with a sound financial resource-base. The Association is backed by a democratic, participative management system and is under the leadership of individuals drawn from educational, industrial and other walks of life.

The trust manages The New College in the city of Chennai along with MEASI Matriculation Higher Secondary School, New College Institute of Management, MEASI Academy of Architecture, Institute of Research in Soil Biology & Bio-Technology, MEASI Urdu Academy and MEASI Institute of Information Technology, MEASI C.A. Academy.

== Leadership ==
By 1930, the organisation came under the control of Muslims. However, the present board of trustees includes Muslims from different background.

== Institutions under MEASI ==
Institute	Year
The New College, Chennai	1951
MEASI Matriculation Higher Secondary School	1985
MEASI Institute of Management	1987
MEASI Academy	1991
MEASI Charitable Trust	1992
MEASI Computer Academy	1994
Institute of Research in Soil Biology and Bio-Technology	1995
MEASI Institute of Hotel Management and Catering Technology	1995 (closed in 2001)
MEASI Academy of Architecture	1999
MEASI Urdu Academy	1999
MEASI Institute of Information Technology	2002
MEASI College of Education	2009
MEASI C A Academy	2016
