= Hanuman Temple, Kedara-Gouri =

Coordinates: 20.240086°N 85.835044°E

The Hanuman Temple is located in the Kedara-Gouri temple precinct, Kedara-Gouri road, Old Town, Bhubaneswar. The enshrined deity is a two-armed Hanuman image. This temple is maintained by the Kedara-Gouri Trust Board. Architectural features indicate that the temple was built in the 15th or 16th century A.D. It is constructed in kalingan style with laterite stone.

== Surrounding ==
The temple is surrounded by the Gouri Kunda to the south, the kitchen to the west, the compound wall to the east, and Shahasralinga to the north.

== Architectural features ==
The temple stands on a low pista that measures 0.28 meters in height. On plan, the temple has a square vimana measuring 3.40 square meters. On elevation, the vimana is of pidha order that measures 5.50 meters in height having bada, gandi, and mastaka. The Bada is trianga that measures 2.00 meters (pabhaga 0.55 meters, jangha 0.87 meters, and baranda 0.58 meters). The Gandi consists of two tiers measuring 2.50 meters in height, and the mastaka is 1.00 meters.
