= Prasanna Pandian =

K. PRASANNA PANDIAN
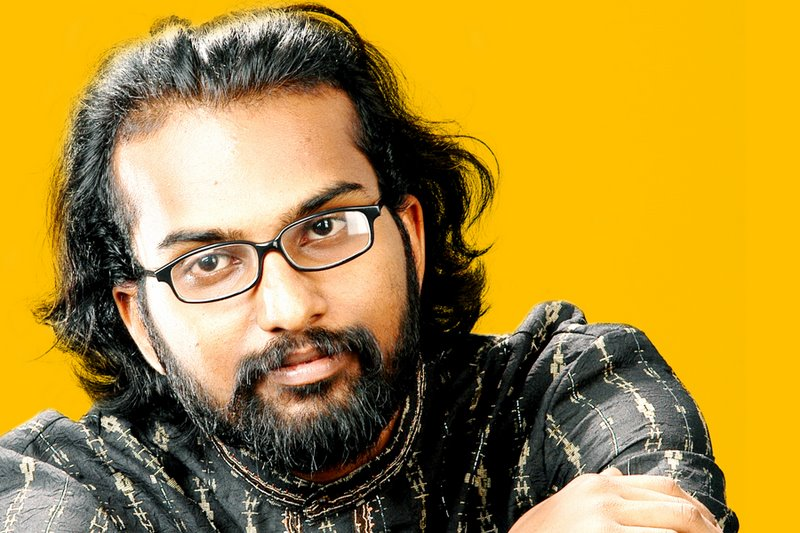

Artist, architect and animator

Personal details
- Born: 26 February 1984 (age 41) Madurai, Tamil Nadu

K. Prasanna Pandian also known as PP, is an artist, architect and an animator from Tamil Nadu in south India. He was born in Madurai, Tamil Nadu in 1984, and is the founder-director of Archinfinitum, an architectural firm. He has won many awards and titles in the field of art and architecture and is good in interior design and landscape architecture. He was also introduced to the Tamil cinema industry as a music director. He finished his B.Arch at Measi Academy of Architecture, Chennai, while his schooling was at Madurai, Mahatma Montessori Matriculation Higher Secondary School.

== Early life ==
Prasanna was born in Madurai, India where he completed his schooling, after which he completed his Bachelor of Architecture at the Measi Academy of Architecture, Chennai and then his Master of Architecture at Sathyabama University, Chennai, India.

== Awards ==
Awards in the field of Architecture:

- Birla White – Yuva Rathna Award – All India - 2nd GRC category – 2004-2005
- Birla White – Yuva Rathna Award – Commendation Flooring category – 2004-2005
- Birla White – Yuva Rathna Award – Zone (south) - 1st GRC category – 2005-2006
- Birla White – Yuva Rathna Award – State - 1st Flooring category – 2005-2006
- Jindal Stainless Steel Award – Commendation – 2005
- A+D the Strokes Furniture Design Award – Commendation – 2005
- Archi Design Perspectives – Top 10th Position – All India – 2005
- Johnson Ties – Finalist – State LvL – 2005
- Saint Gobain – Finalist – All India – 2006

Awards in the Field of Art:

- Best Artist Award, Mahatma, Madurai - 2001
