= Prasanna Venkateswara Puram =

- Interactive map of Prasanna Venkateswara Puram
- Location in Andhra Pradesh, India Prasanna Venkateswara Puram (India)
- Coordinates: 13°31′35″N 79°23′02″E
- Country: India
- State: Andhra Pradesh
- District: Tirupati
- Mandal: Ramachandrapuram

Population
  - Total: 500

Languages
  - Official: Telugu
- Time zone: UTC+05:30 (IST)
- Website: www.pvpuram.in

PV Puram, also known as Prasanna Venkateswara Puram, is a village located in Tirupati district, Andhra Pradesh, India. It is a small village of around 120 houses with a population of 500.
