= Hanumantha Rao =

Hanumatha Rao or Hanumantharao is an Indian name common among Telugu speakers and may refer to:

- C. H. Hanumantha Rao, an Indian economist and writer, served as a member of the National Advisory Council
- Gundu Hanumantha Rao, an Indian actor in Telugu cinema
- Madapati Hanumantha Rao (1885 - 1970), first Mayor of Hyderabad, India
- Moturu Hanumantha Rao, a Communist party leader in the state of Andhra Pradesh, India
- Saluri Hanumantha Rao (1917–1980), a music composer of South Indian films
- S. N. Hanumantha Rao (1929-2013), a cricket umpire from India
- V. Hanumantha Rao, a politician of the Indian National Congress party and a Member of Parliament
- Hanumantha Rao Pasupuleti, an Indian paediatrician and social worker from Hyderabad

== See also ==
- Hanuman (disambiguation)
