= Khajuraho Hanuman inscription =

Khajuraho
- town
- Location within India Location within Madhya Pradesh
- Coordinates: 24.85°N 79.93°E
- Country: India
- State: Madhya Pradesh
- District: Chhatarpur
- Elevation: 283 m (928 ft)

Population (2011)
  - Total: 1,762,857

Languages
  - Official: Hindi
- Time zone: UTC+5:30 (IST)

The Khajurāho Hanumān inscription is an epigraphic record on the base of a colossal figure of Hanuman, located at the temple site of Khajuraho in Madhya Pradesh, India. The inscription dates to the tenth century CE. The Hanumān is under the protection of the Archaeological Survey of India, being listed as a monument of national importance.

== Location ==
The inscription is on the base of a well-known image of Hanumān at Khajurāho. Because the figure is under worship and the shrine renovated, the inscription is not presently visible.

== Publication ==
The inscription and the image of Hanumān are frequently mentioned in the literature on Khajurāho. The inscription was first noticed by Alexander Cunningham in the nineteenth century. D. R. Bhandarkar revisited the inscription in 1904 and published a new reading, in addition to a fresh interpretation of the date.

== Description and Contents ==
The inscription is written in Sanskrit in three lines. The style of the characters supports a date in the tenth century CE.

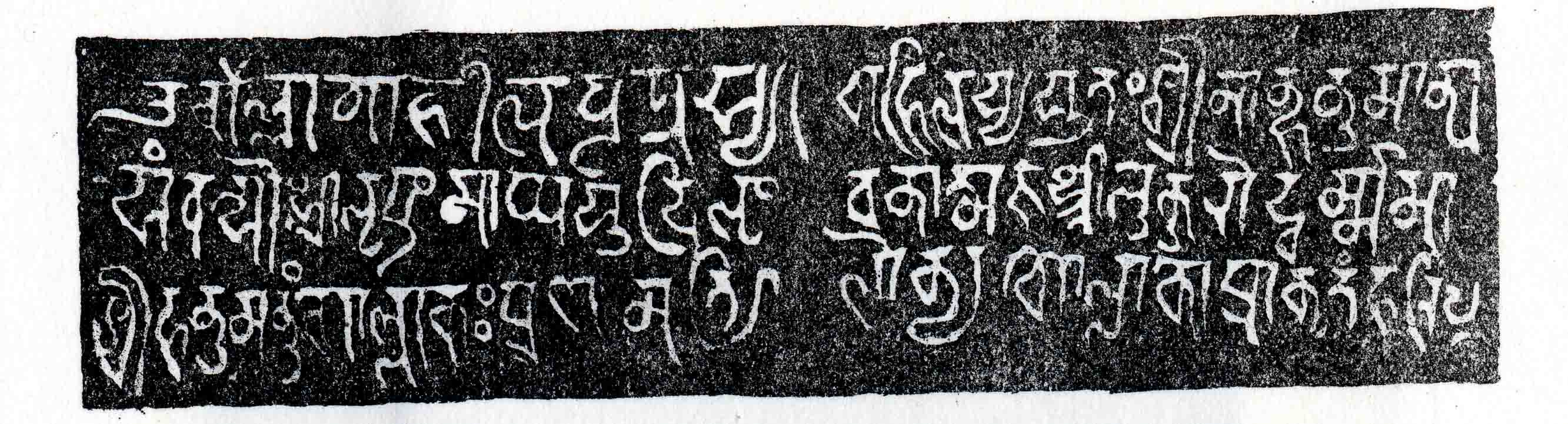
Hanumān Inscription at Khajurāho

== Historical significance ==
The Khajurāho inscription is of great importance for the history of Hinduism because it gives a date of 316. This is taken by historians to refer to the Harṣa era, thus giving a date of 922 in the common era. While there are certainly figures of Hanumān that are older than the tenth century, this inscription makes the Khajurāho image the oldest dated Hanumān currently known.

== Text ==
The uncorrected text reads as follows:

Left side:

1. oṃ gollāgāhīlapūtrasya
2. saṃvatsro °300 10 6° māghaśudi 10°
3. śrīhanumantaṃ g[o]llākaḥ praṇamati

Right side:

1. gahilasya sutaḥ śrīmānhanumānpa
2. vanātmajam aṇukṛod dharmmam ā-
3. lokya gollākāprākataṃ harim

== Translation ==
part I

1. oṃ. [The record of] Gollā, son of Gāhīla.
2. The year 316 on the 10th day of the bright fortnight in the month of Māgha.
3. Gollāka bows to Śrī Hanumān.

part II

1. Gollāka, the son of Gahila, having beheld the umanifest Hari,
2. afterward made this religious work, the glorious Hanumān, the son of the wind.

== See also ==
- Indian inscriptions
