= The Westward Journey =

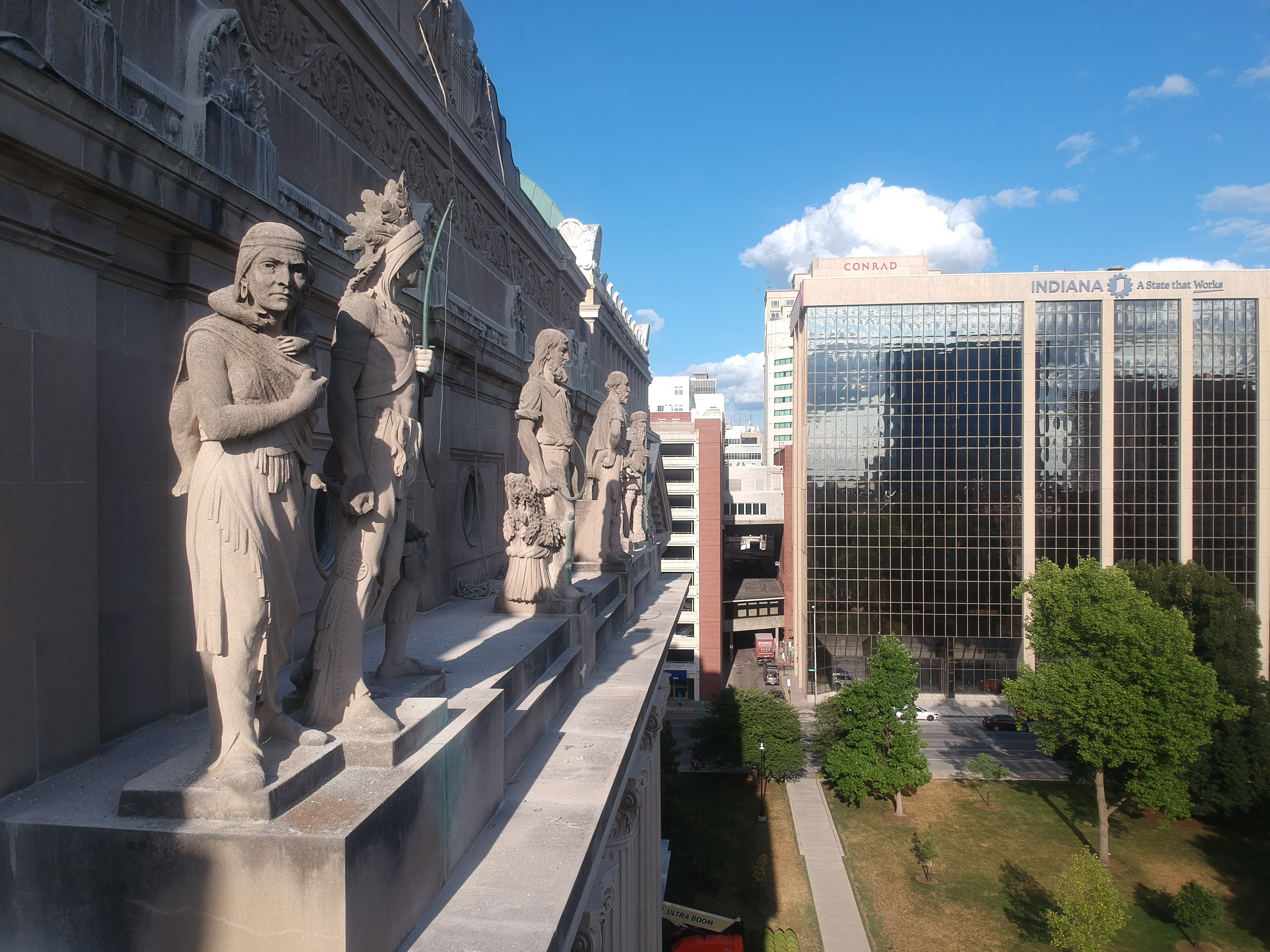
- Artist: Herman Carl Mueller
- Year: 1886-1887
- Type: Limestone and bronze
- Dimensions: 365.78 cm × 106.68 cm (144.01 in × 42.00 in)
- Location: Indianapolis, Indiana; 39°46′4.75″N 86°9′45.67″W
- Owner: Indiana Statehouse

The Westward Journey, also listed as Indians, Reaper, Blacksmith, Pioneer Family, is a set of outdoor sculptures made by Herman Carl Mueller in 1886–1887, located above the south portico of the Indiana Statehouse in Indianapolis, the capital of the U.S. state of Indiana.

== Description ==
Located above the south entrance portico of the Indiana Statehouse are four groups of themed, symbolic figures carved in sculpted limestone. Above the figures on the portico and the cornice of the building, is a gilded eagle with outspread wings.

Starting from the west, the first figural grouping is of a Native American, "Indiana" family. A chief stands in the center of this grouping with his face facing east with a metal staff or rifle in his hands. To his right is a woman with a papoose on her back; she faces west. On the chief's left is another [young] Indian male figure or Brave wearing a loin cloth.

To the left of the Indian grouping is a single male figure of a reaper (or farmer) holding a metal sickle and looking due south. He has a full beard and wears a shirt with full length pants. His left arm is on his hip with his hat in his left hand.

To the left of the reaper is a figure of a blacksmith who also looks south. The blacksmith has a beard and wears a shirt with rolled up sleeves and a blacksmith apron with full length pants. He stands with his right arm placed on his hip, bent at the elbow with a metal blacksmith tool in his right hand. An anvil is located behind him.

On the eastern end of the portico is a figural grouping of a pioneer family. Standing in the center of the grouping is the father who wears a buckskin shirt and full-length pants who is holding a bronze rifle. To his left is the mother, who wears a long pioneer dress and sunbonnet. Her right hand is raised to her brow to shield her eyes from the sun. A young boy stands to the right of father, wearing breeches or 3/4 length pants and a hat. All three pioneer figures are facing west.

Above these figures at the center of the pediment, above the cornice is a stone American bald eagle with its wings spread and gilded in gold. Given that this is a national symbol of the United States, and that a shield with stars and stripes is at the eagle's chest, this indicates Indiana's place within the union.

== Symbolism of the Indians, reaper, blacksmith, and pioneer family ==
The Indians symbolize where the state "Indiana" derives the state name, the positioning of the figures suggest that the land once belonged to them.

From the east comes a new era with a farmer or reaper holding a metal sickle and a blacksmith with his apron and tools in hand depicting his trade. These two figures symbolize the skills needed to obtain and utilize the fruits of the new land.

The Pioneer Family (man, woman, young boy, and young girl) also represents a new era and the westward expansion from the east. The man wears a buckskin shirt indicating his resourcefulness and adaptation to ways of the west and great plains region. In combination of the two figure groupings (Blacksmith and Pioneer Family) likely symbolize the growing expansion of the railroads from the east to the west.

The National Park Service web page about the Statehouse says that "The sculptural program atop the portico is The Westward Journey. On the left side of the cornice ledge, Native Americans are forced west, while Euro-American pioneers enter from the east."

== Historical information ==
=== Location history ===
The location of the four figures over the south entrance was originally designed and intended as the main entrance to the State House. The south entrance was intended to be the main entrance because that it faced The National Road, which is Washington Street in present-day Indianapolis. The National Road is marked by a stone marker in the front or most central southern portion of the lawn of the south entrance. It is directly in front of the George Washington Statue and the markers indicating previous tree dedications.

=== Acquisition ===
The acquisition of the four figures was part of the overall commission of the construction of the new State Capitol building. The figures could have been added sometime after 1886 when the roofing was completed on the exterior of the building. The capitol building was opened to the public January 6, 1887 for the start of the first session of the Indiana General Assembly.

== Artist ==
Herman Carl Mueller is the sculptor of these four groupings of limestone sculptures. A native of Germany, he was most active in Trenton, New Jersey. At the time of the construction of the Indiana State house he was active in Zanesville, Ohio.

Mueller made artistic contributions to other civic buildings in the state of Indiana, including the encaustic floor tiles of the Allen County Courthouse in Fort Wayne, Indiana. He is known for his techniques and contributions to the clay tile industry (Mueller Mosaic Co., Trenton New Jersey), and was also a sculptor of commemorative civic statues.

== Condition ==
The SOS! Survey Questionnaire (Save Outdoor Sculpture!) describes the overall condition of the four grouping of sculptures, as showing signs of erosion. The metal sickle of The Reaper, the rifle of the adult male in The Pioneer Family, and the metal staff or rifle of the Chief, have caused a light green staining on the limestone sculptures.
