= The New College, Chennai =

Muslim-majority college in Tamil Nadu, India

The New College
- புதுக்கல்லூரி
- Motto: O Lord! Increase my knowledge
- Established: 2 July 1951; 75 years ago
- Affiliations: University of Madras
- Chairman: Nawab Muhammed Abdul Ali
- Principal: M. Asrar Sheriff
- Location: Peters Road, Royapettah, Chennai, Tamil Nadu, India; 13.053889°N 80.259622°E
- Campus: Urban
- Website: thenewcollege.edu.in

The New College is an institution of higher education in Chennai, Tamil Nadu. Established in 1951, the institution is one of the affiliated colleges of the University of Madras, with autonomous status. The college was established by the Muslim Educational Association of Southern India (MEASI) to meet the educational requirements of the Muslim students in Southern India. The majority of students in the college are from the Muslim community.

== Location ==
The college is located in the Center of Chennai on a 9-acre (3.6 ha) campus on Peters Road, Royapettah. It is one of the few colleges in Chennai located within the city hub. The older buildings are notable for their Indo-Saracenic architecture which stand in contrast to the new educational blocks. The older buildings are being renovated. The same campus also houses New College Institute of Management, MEASI Academy of Architecture And Institute of Research in Soil Biology and Bio-Technology, MEASI Institute of Information Technology And MEASI CA Academy.

The New College was founded on 2 July 1951 by the Muslim Educational Association of Southern India (MEASI), the college is an institution of higher education offering instruction in more than twenty courses in humanities, science and commerce at undergraduate level and more than twelve courses at postgraduate level. Though primarily established for providing higher education to Muslim students, its doors are open to students from all communities. Deeniyath classes for Muslim students and moral instruction classes for others, are conducted during working hours. Working hours are 08.30 am to 01.30 pm for shift I and 02.15 pm to 06.40 pm for shift II

== Courses ==
The college offers 25 Courses in humanities, sciences and commerce at the Undergraduate Level and 10 courses at the Postgraduate Level.

=== Shift I (08:30 AM To 01:30 PM) ===
==== Undergraduate – Aided ====
- B.A. Arabic
- B.A. Economics
- B.A. English
- B.A. History
- B.A. Sociology
- B.Sc. Mathematics
- B.Sc. Physics
- B.Sc. Chemistry
- B.Sc. Plant Biology & Plant Biotechnology
- B.Sc. Advanced Zoology & Biotechnology
- B.Com. General
- B.Com. Corporate Secretaryship

==== Undergraduate – Self-Financing ====
- B.Sc. Computer Science

==== Postgraduate – Aided ====
- M.A. Arabic
- M.A. Tamil
- M.A. English
- M.Sc. Chemistry
- M.Sc. Zoology
- M.Com.

==== Research Courses ====
===== Part Time =====
- M.Phil. / Ph.D. Arabic
- M.Phil. / Ph.D. Tamil
- M.Phil. / Ph.D. Chemistry
- Ph.D. English
- Ph.D. Economics
- Ph.D. Zoology
- Ph.D. Physics
- Ph.D. Commerce

===== Full Time =====
- M.Phil. English
- M.Phil. / Ph.D. Tamil
- M.Phil. / Ph.D. Arabic
- M.Phil. / Ph.D. Economics
- M.Phil. / Ph.D. Chemistry
- M.Phil. / Ph.D. Zoology
- M.Phil. / Ph.D. Commerce

=== Shift II (02:00PM To 06:20 PM) ===
==== Undergraduate – Self Financing ====
- B.Sc. Information Technology
- B.A. Urdu
- B.A. Criminology and Police Administration
- B.Sc. Biotechnology
- B.Sc. Computer Science
- B.B.A.
- B.C.A.
- B.Com. General
- B.Com. Corporate Secretaryship
- B.Com. Bank Management
- B.Com. Information Systems Management
- B.Com. Accounting and Finance
- B.Com. Professional Accounting

==== Postgraduate – Self-Financing ====
- M.A. History
- M.Sc. Computer Science
- M.Sc. Physics
- M.Sc. Mathematics
- M.Sc. Botany
- M.Com. Corporate Secretaryship

== Campus culture ==
The campus is cosmopolitan with students from India and abroad, especially from Islamic nations such as Saudi Arabia, Oman, Sudan, Malaysia and Bangladesh.

The college represents numerous sports activities all over the city. The college conducts elections to select Students Chairman and General Secretary.

== MEASI Institute of Management ==
In 1987, the Muslim Educational Association of Southern India established the MEASI Institute of Management to give training in management with emphasis on practical application suited to Indian environmental and management requirements. It is one of the few institutions in South India that offered an MBA Programme in 1987. The IM is managed by a board of trustees consisting of:

- M. Mohammed Hashim, Chairman
- H. M. Shamsudeen, Executive Director
- A. Mohamed Ashraf, Finance Director
- M. Avais Musvee, Member
- M. Mohamed Shameem, Member
- Abdul Jabbar Suhail, Member
- K. Shahid Mansoor, Member
- Irsad Ahmed Mecca, Member
- M. Mohamed Hashim, Invitee
- U. Mohamed Khalilullah, Invitee
- A. K. Abdulla, Invitee
- Noman H. Millwala, Invitee
- C. Abdul Malick, Invitee
- Imtiaz Ahamed, Invitee
- Dr. Major Zahid Husain, Ex Officio Member
- N. Balasubramanian, Director

MEASI IM has air-conditioned classrooms, a boardroom, staff rooms, offices, and a mini-auditorium. The course offered is M.B.A (full-time and part-time). It is approved by AICTE, affiliated to the University of Madras, accredited by the National Board of Accreditation, and ISO 9001-2000 certified.

MEASI IM has produced gold medals and ranks both in the full-time and part-time MBA programs. It has produced 100% results almost every year. Students of the institute have taken part in inter-collegiate management meets conducted by business-schools and have brought laurels. More than 75% of the students have been placed in companies through the placement cell of the institute, every year. MEASI Institute of Management was ranked consistently in various magazines such as Times of India, India today's best business school, Careers 360, Silicon India, Outlook India and Dun & Bradstreet B school surveys.

== MEASI Institute of Information Technology ==
MEASI Institute of Information Technology is an independent institute in Chennai, offering an MCA programme. It was founded in 2002 by the Muslim Educational Association of Southern India (MEASI). The association was registered under the societies act XXI of 1860.

The MEASI ITT was established to run postgraduate courses in computer science and information technology, and approved by the All India Council for Technical Education (AICTE), New Delhi and affiliated to the University of Madras, Chennai.

== MEASI Academy of Architecture ==
MEASI Academy of Architecture was established in 1999 by the Muslim Educational Association of Southern India (MEASI). MEASI AA is located in the heart of city, inside the New college campus. It consists of studios and classrooms.

The Board of Trustees is:

- Chairman – K. Ameenur Rahman
- Hon. Secretary – H. M. Shamsudeen
- Hon. Treasurer – A. Mohammed Ashraf
- Trustees – A. Mohamed Haris
- T. P. Imbichammad
- S. Ziaudeen Ahmed
- H. C. Abdul Azeez

Courses are five year B.Arch, five year B.Arch (Interior Design), and two year postgraduate M.Arch (Real Estate Development).

The course is headed by Prof. N. Altaf Ahmed. It is accredited by the National Board of Accreditation and ISO 9001-2000 certified.

The Alumni Association of MEASI Academy of Architecture was formed with ten batches of Alumnus on 13 September 2013, supporting the growth and development of the institution.

== New College Managing Committee ==
- Chairman – Nawab Mohammed Ali Azimjah,
- Honorary Secretary and Correspondent – Janab Elias Sait

Treasurer Janab.Najmuddin Members

- Janab
- Janab Alhaj
- M. Mohamed Hasim
- S. M. Hamid
- Makkal Pavalar Inkulab (orator and revolutionary Tamil writer).

== Notable alumni ==
- T. R. Baalu (Madras University), MP for Sriperumbudur
- Veera Bahu, Tamil cinema actor and director
- Nelson Dilipkumar, Tamil film director and screenwriter
- M. S. Guhan, film producer
- Jaishankar (New College), Tamil actor
- Chinni Jayanth (New College), Tamil cinema comedian and mimicry artist
- Raj Kapoor, Tamil film director and actor
- C. S. Karnan (New College), former judge
- Karthik, Tamil cinema actor
- Sarath Kumar, Tamil cinema actor and former MP (2001–2006)
- Prasanna Pandian, artist, architect and animator
- K. R. Periyakaruppan (New College), Member of the Tamil Nadu Legislative Assembly (2006–2026) and Minister in the Government of Tamil Nadu (2006–2011, 2022–2026)
- Nagendra Prasad, film actor
- Vineeth Radhakrishnan, Tamil and Malayalam cinema actor
- Puneeth Rajkumar, Kannada actor
- Shiva Rajkumar (New College), Kannada actor
- Woorkeri Raman, cricketer
- Radha Ravi, Tamil cinema actor and politician
- Bharath Srinivasan, Tamil cinema actor
- G. K. Vasan (New College), Indian politician
