= Prasanna Venkatesa Perumal Temple, Thanjavur =

Hindu temple in Thanjavur, Tamil Nadu

Prasanna Venkatesa Perumal Temple is a Hindu temple located in the town of Thanjavur in Tamil Nadu, India. The presiding deity is Vishnu. The temple was constructed by the Thanjavur Maratha king Pratapsingh in the 18th century.

The temple is associated with the life of Carnatic composer Muthuswami Dikshitar who has written many songs here. Annual kutcheris are held during the Tamil month of Aadi in his memory.
