= Prasanna Alahakoon =

Sri Lanka naval officer and engineer

- Military career
- Allegiance: Sri Lanka
- Branch: Sri Lanka Navy
- Service years: 1987-Present
- Rank: Commodore
- Commands: SLN Dockyard
- Conflicts: Sri Lankan Civil War

Commodore Prasanna Alahakoon, USP, psc, SLN is a Sri Lanka naval officer and engineer. He is the Deputy Superintendent of the SLN Dockyard and former Deputy Director Naval Projects and Plans as well as the Head of the Department of Electrical and Electronics of the General Sir John Kotelawala Defence University.

Alahakoon was educated at the Royal College Colombo and entered the University of Moratuwa to study engineering. However, he left to join the Sri Lanka Navy without graduating, and gained a BTech in engineering from the Naval College of Engineering (INS Shivaji) in Lonavala, and specialized in electrical engineering at INS Valsura in Jamnagar. He graduated from the Naval War College with a BSc in War Studies, and holds an MBA in Management of Technology from the University of Moratuwa.

Alahakoon has served in the Engineering Branch of the Sri Lanka Navy, serving as the Deputy Director Naval Projects and Plans at SLNS Parakrama the naval headquarters. He has also served as the Head of the Department of Electrical and Electronics of the General Sir John Kotelawala Defence University.

Alahakoon has been awarded the service medals Uttama Seva Padakkama, Sri Lanka Armed Services Long Service Medal and the campaign medal Eastern Humanitarian Operations Medal.

== See also ==
- Sri Lanka Navy
