= Prasanna Yoga Anjaneyar Temple =

Hindu temple in Chennai, India

Prasanna Yoga Anjaneyar Temple is a Hindu temple devoted to Hanuman, located Chromepet, Chennai, India, near the Madras Institute of Technology.

== History ==
The Hanuman idol was found sometime around 1930. According to local folklore, a 13-year-old girl living in this area, Aanjaneya Ammal, had a dream one night that the God wanted his temple to be built in this place. The next day she told her family.

Some days later, Mahaswami Sri Chandrashekarendra Saraswati was visiting the area. Ammal shared her dream with the Swamigal. The Swamigal immediately asked the people with him to go and search the area. The men went as advised and found a number of idols lying on the ground. Later with Tirumala Tirupati Devasthanams funding, the temple was constructed on the site.

== Services ==
Puja is conducted every day and hundreds of residents throng this temple for the Lord's blessing. One can also find the photo of Aanjaneya Ammal inside the temple.

Every six months, the current poojari of the temple, Thiru Raghavan, conducts Pazhakapu (decoration with fruits) and Vennakapu (decoration with butter) of the lord's Vigraham (idol). As part of this ritual, donations are collected from interested devotees and the Lord is decorated elaborately for the Puja. Fruits are used on some days and butter on some others.
