= Hanuman Temple, Connaught Place =

Hindu temple in Delhi, India

Hanuman Temple
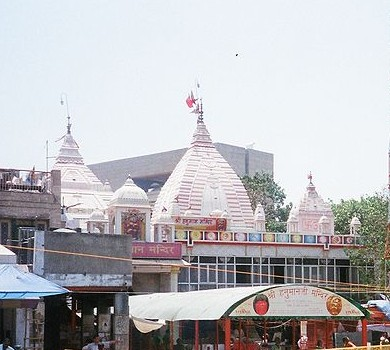

- Location in Delhi

Religion
- Affiliation: Hinduism
- Deity: Hanuman

Location
- Location: New Delhi
- Country: India
- Coordinates: 28°37′48″N 77°12′54″E

Architecture
- Type: Hindu temple architecture
- Creator: Maharajas – Mansingh and Jai Singh II of Amber
- Completed: 1724

Hanuman Temple is an ancient Hindu temple in Connaught Place, New Delhi, India, and according to the local tradition, it is one of the five temples from the days of the Mahabharata in Delhi. The other four temples are the Kalkaji, a Kali temple in South Delhi containing a Swayambhu (Sanskrit: "self-manifested") rock idol, the Yogmaya Temple near Qutub Minar, the Bhairav temple near the Purana Qila and the Nili Chatri Mahadev (Shiva temple) at Nigambodh Ghat outside the walls of Old Delhi.

The temple, which has a self-manifest idol of Hanuman, has an unusual feature fixed in the spire (Shikhara) in the form of a crescent moon instead of the Hindu symbol of Aum or Sun that is commonly seen in most Hindu temples. This became particularly important during the Mughal period corroborating this extraordinary depiction.

The idol in the temple, devotionally worshipped as "Sri Hanuman Ji Maharaj" (Great Lord Hanuman), is that of Bala Hanuman, namely, Hanuman as a child.

== History ==
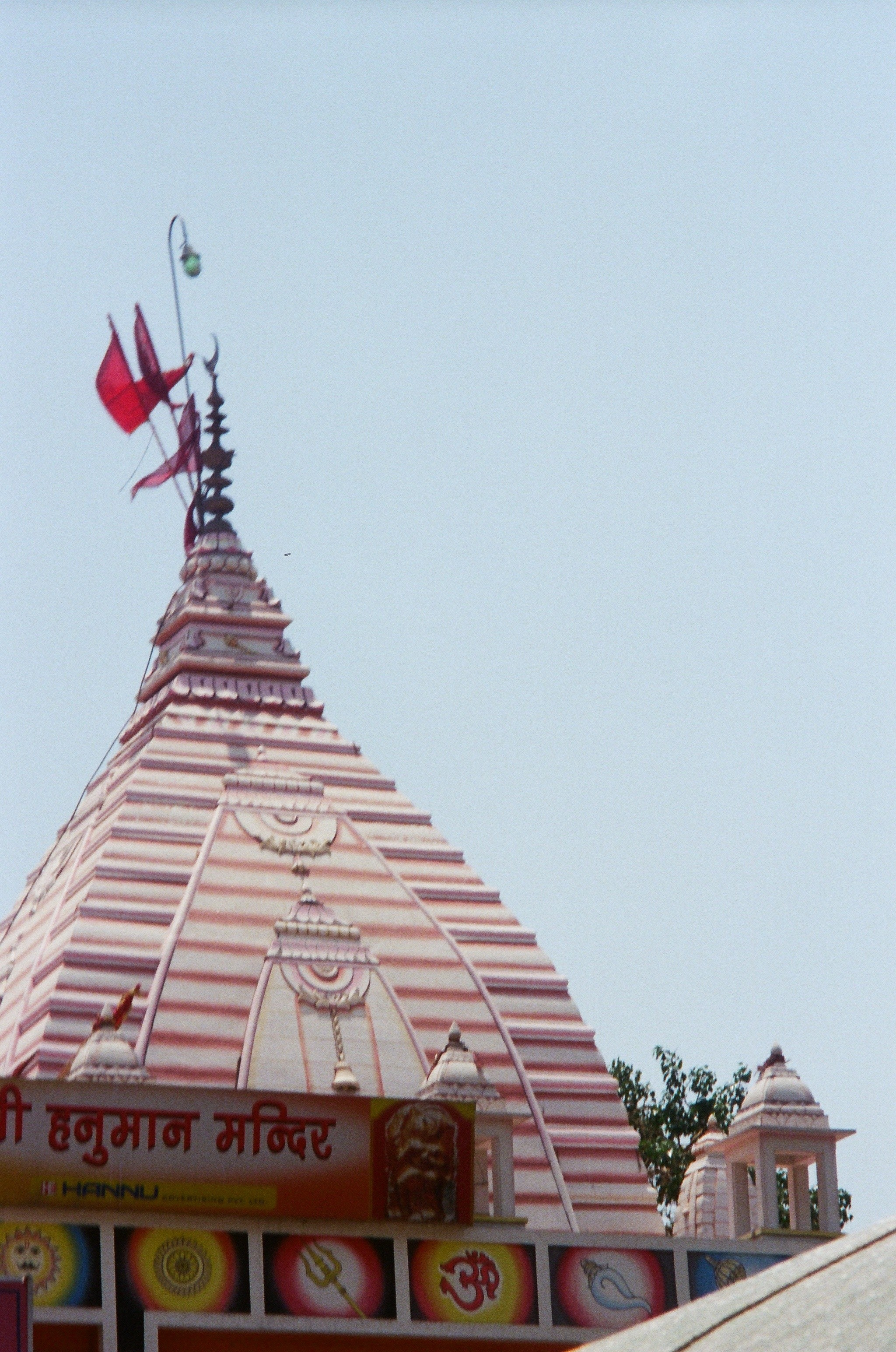
Crescent Moon on the spire of the temple

Hanuman Temple is traditionally identified as one of five temples in Delhi associated with the Mahabharata period and the Pandavas, although the present structure dates from a much later period.

The present temple was reconstructed by Jai Singh II of Amber in 1724, around the same time as the nearby Jantar Mantar. Some accounts attribute an earlier temple on the site to Man Singh I of Amber, who lived during the reign of Akbar. The temple has subsequently undergone several alterations and improvements.

It is believed that Tulsidas (1532–1623), who wrote Ramacharitamanas (popularly known as Tulsi Ramayan) and penned the famous Hanuman Chalisa hymns in praise of Hanuman, visited this temple in Delhi. During his visit to Delhi, Tulsidas was summoned by the Mughal Emperor and asked to perform a miracle, which he did with the blessings of Lord Hanuman. The Emperor was pleased with Tulsidas and presented the Hanuman temple with an Islamic crescent Moon finial which adorns the temple spire. It is claimed that because of the crescent moon symbol on the spire, the temple was not destroyed by the Muslim rulers who invaded India at various times.

== Temple features ==
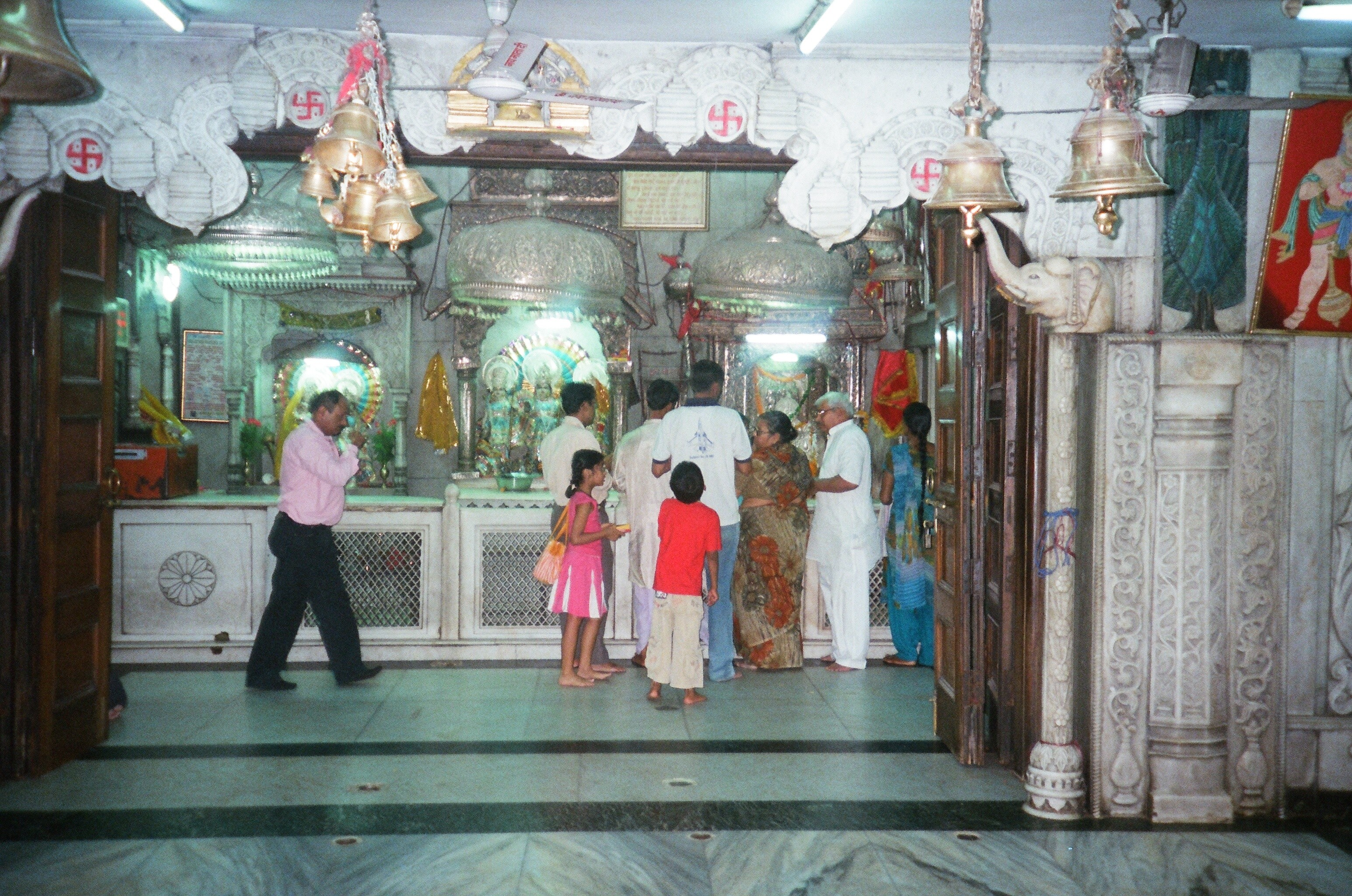
Sanctum wall with Hanuman and other deities facing south

Entry to the temple is through the Baba Kharak Singh Marg. The approach is through a set of marble steps from the road level leading into the main foyer of the temple through massive silver-plated doors, which are engraved with scenes of the epic Ramayana. The foyer is ventilated with clerestory windows that are adorned with paintings of Hanuman in the cardinal directions depicting his four aspects. Below each Hanuman painting, the full text of Tulsidas's Sundar Kand is inscribed on the marble tablets affixed on the walls. The sanctum sanctorum, which houses the Hanuman idol, is on the north wall on the right side of the entry foyer (pictured), with the idol facing the southern direction in a small bas-relief carving (pictured). Images of Radha and Krishna, a central triumvirate of Rama, Lakshmana and Sita are also installed to the right of the Hanuman idol on the same wall.

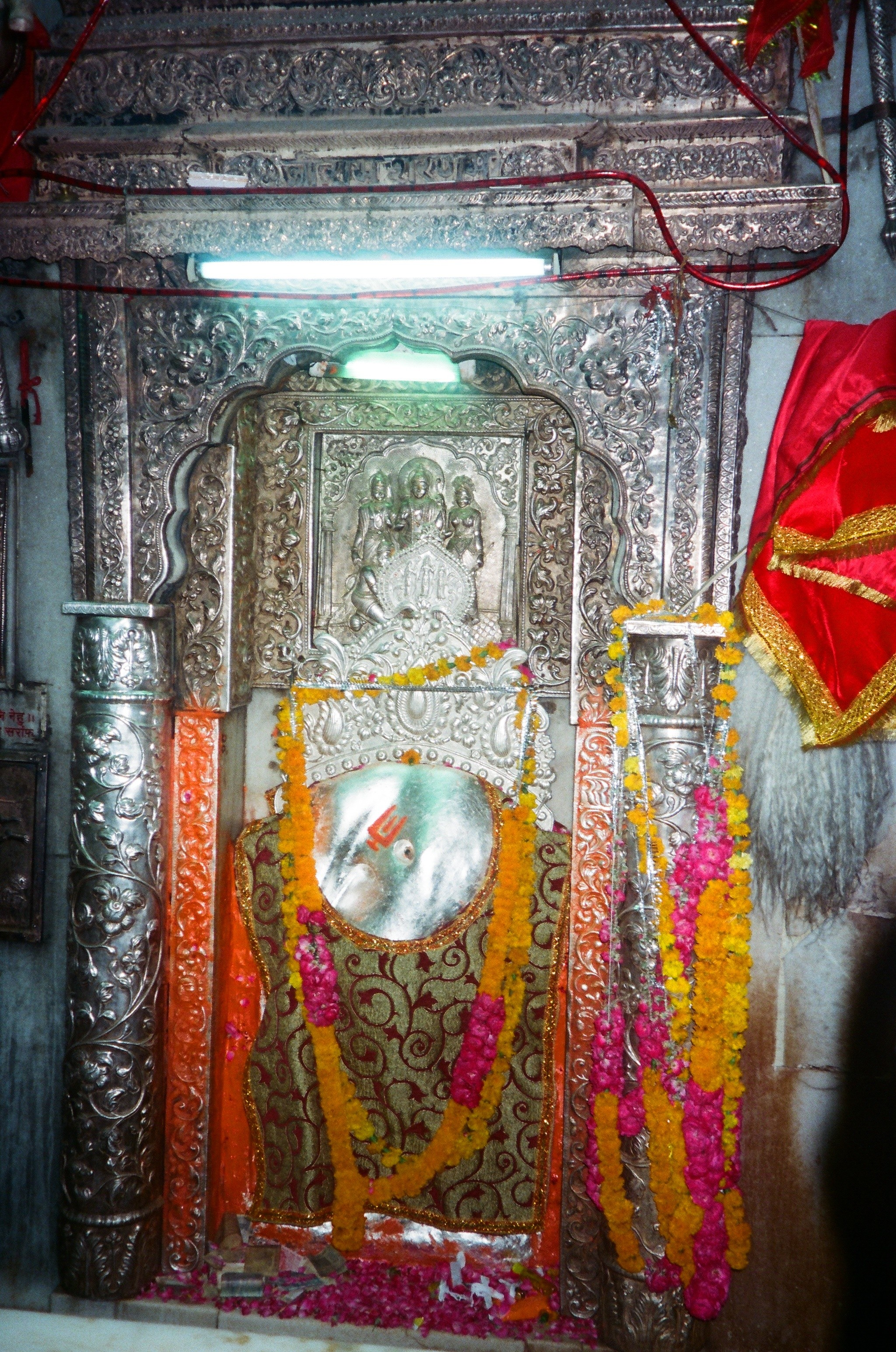
Main Idol of Bala Hanuman

As the idol of Hanuman faces the southern direction, devotees can discern only one eye of the idol. The idol depicts a Gada (mace or club) in the left hand with the right hand crossed across the chest showing veneration to the adjacent idol of Rama, Lakshmana and Sita. A tapering crown adorns the idol, which has a sacred thread on the right shoulder and is clad in a fashioned dhoti. The height of the temple is reported to be 108 ft (32.9 m). The ceiling of the main mandap (hall or pavilion) depicts the epic story of Ramayana artistically painted. In recent years, the New Delhi Municipal Corporation (NDMC) has enhanced the religious character of the temple precincts by incorporating within the main complex a shrine to Shiva, Parvati and their children, of the same size as the adjoining main sanctum, another enclosure housing idols of Durga, Lakshmi Narayan and Ganesha and on the south in an annex the idol of goddess Santoshi Mata (the wish fulfilling goddess). The last named deity popularized the veneration of the deity among female devotees with Friday worship that was propagated by the religious feature film Jai Santoshi Ma, since 1975.

== Visitor information ==
The temple is situated on the Baba Kharak Singh Road (old Irwin Road) about 250 m (820.2 ft) southwest of Connaught place in Central Delhi, which is the commercial hub of Delhi. Tuesday and Saturday are special days of worship when devotees congregate at the temple in large numbers. Hanuman Jayanti (birthday celebrations of lord Hanuman) is held every year with great fanfare on the full moon (Purnima) day in the month of Chaitra (March – April) as per established lunar Hindu Panchangam or Hindu calendar. Colourful processions with festoons and with devotees wearing Hanuman masks and tails and carrying large idols of Hanuman fill the streets. Commercial establishments within the temple complex sell religious offerings and bangles made of lac and plastic. It is also a popular place for women for Mehndi (temporary henna tattoos).

This temple is well connected by road as well as Delhi Metro. Shivaji stadium is the nearest bus stand and also has Airport Express Metro Line nearby and Rajeev Chowk is the nearest metro station.

== Gallery ==
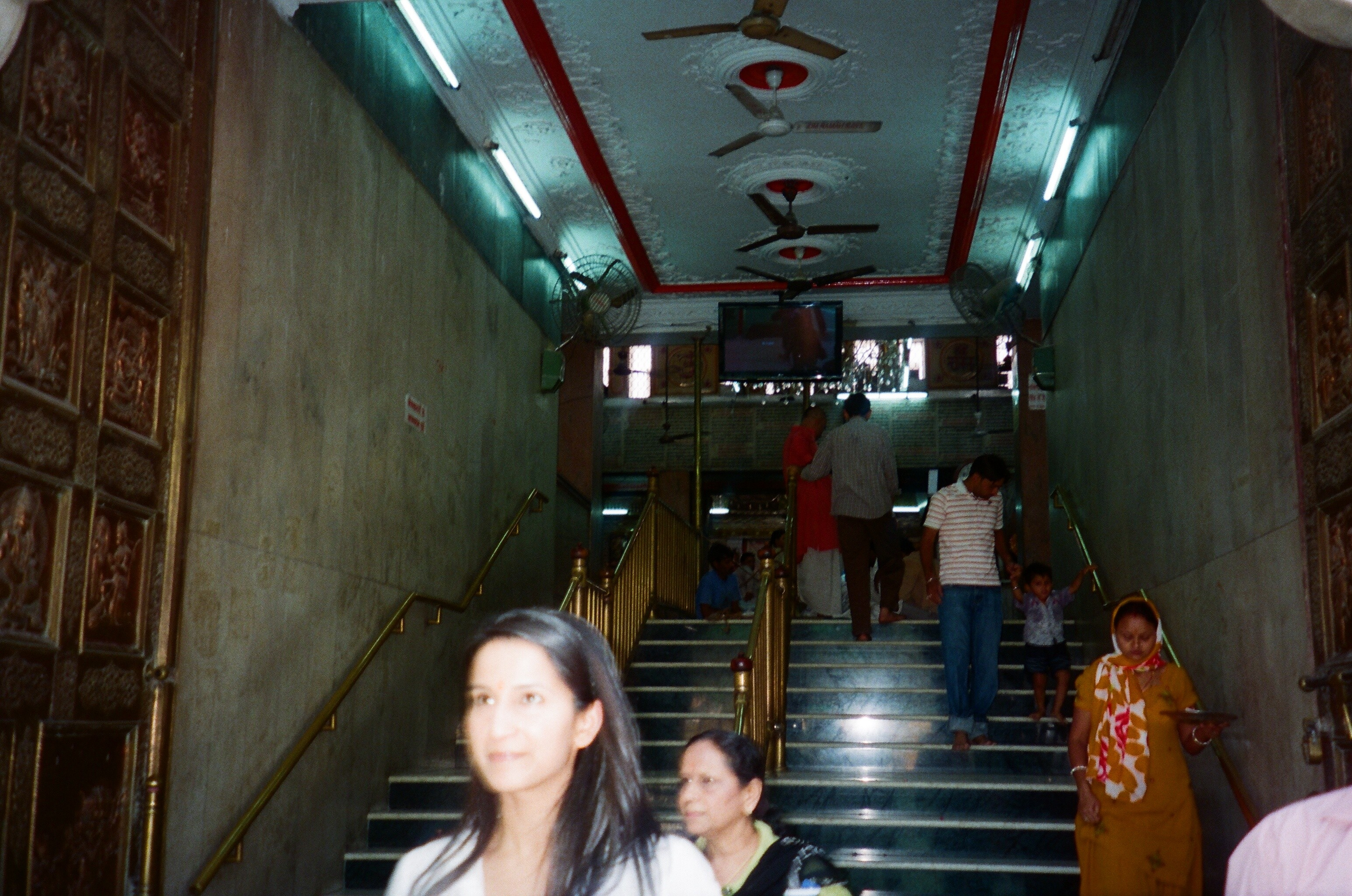
Entry steps with massive silver doors to the Hanuman temple at Connaught Place

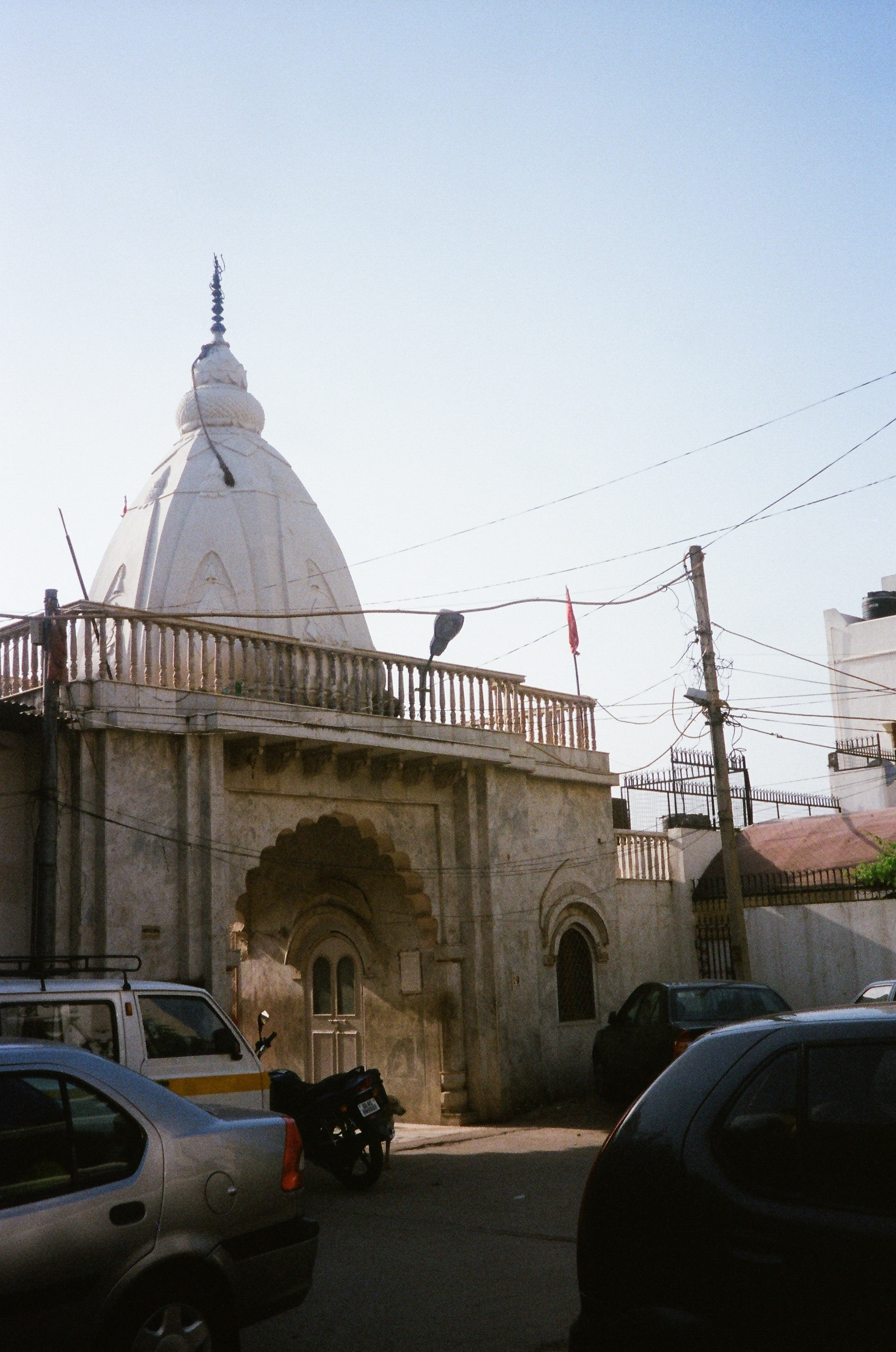
Hanuman Mandir main Gopuram
