= Travels to the West of Qiu Chang Chun =

Literary work

A 19th century printed edition of the Travels to the West of Qiu Chang Chun, from the National Library of China

Title page of the printed edition

A page from a 1445 printed edition of the Travels to the West of Qiu Chang Chun from the Ming dynasty

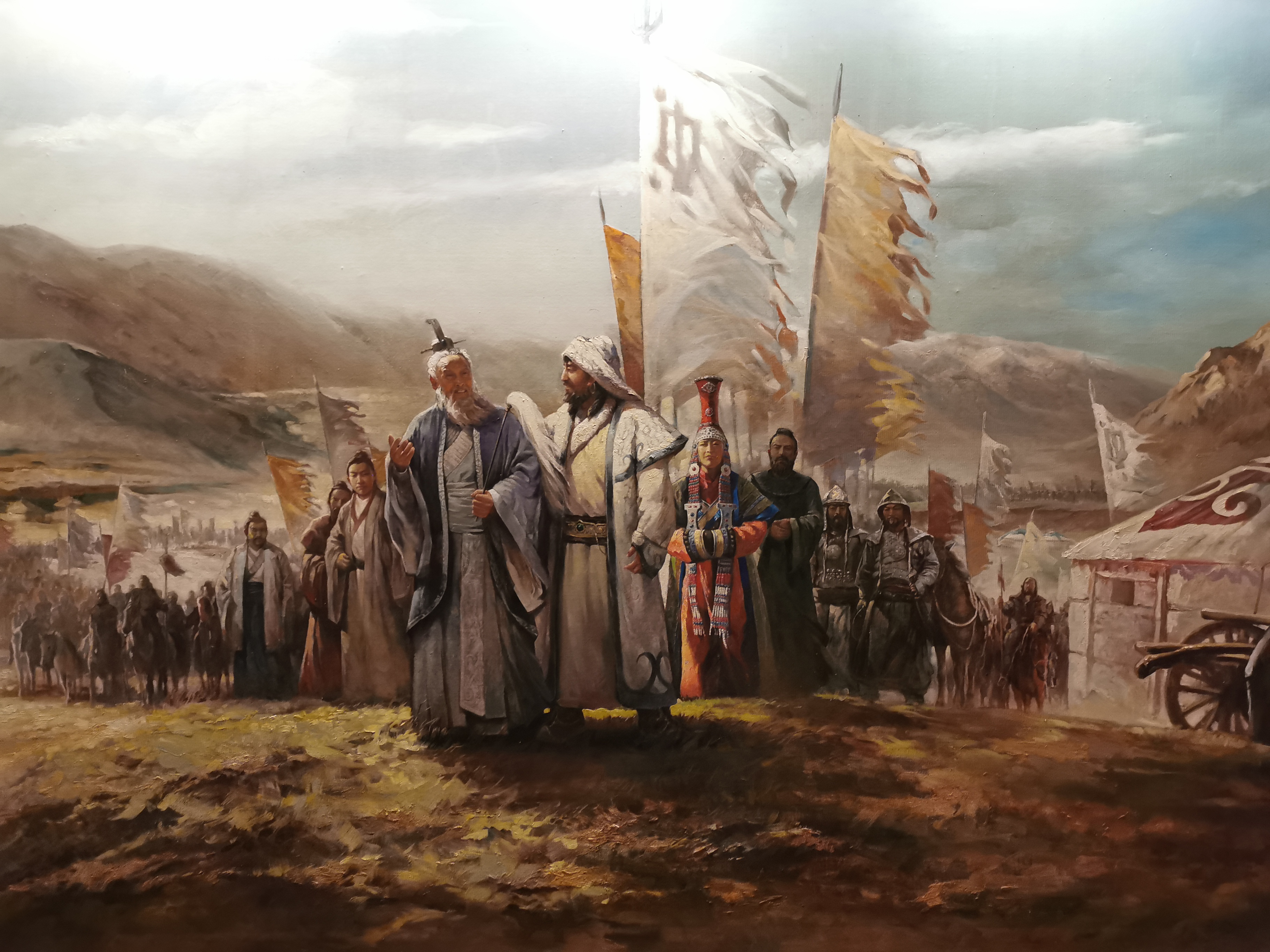
Qiu met with Genghis Khan

Cover of a hand-written manuscript copy of the text

Pages from the manuscript copy

The Travels to the West of Qiu Changchun (traditional Chinese: 長春真人西遊記; simplified Chinese: 长春真人西游记) was a record of the journey embarked by the Taoist master Qiu Chuji who traveled over 10,000 kilometers from Shandong through Central Asia to present himself before Genghis Khan.

In 1220, on the invitation of Genghis Khan with a tiger-head golden tablet (paiza), Qiu Chuji left his hometown in Shandong with eighteen disciples, and traveled north through Yanjing (present day Beijing). In June, they reached Dexing (德興; present-day Julu Hebei) and stayed in the Longyang Taoist Temple (龍陽觀) from summer to end of winter. On February 1221, they resumed their journey. When asked by friends and disciples when to expect the master to return, the master answered "In three years, three years". On February 3, they reached Cuiping Pass (翠帡口; west of Zhangjiakou), they saw the Taihang Mountains to their south. Travelling north then north east, they arrived at Gailipo salt lake (蓋里泊; now named Jiuliancheng Naoer 九連城淖爾; in the south of the Taibus Banner). From there they went to Lake Buir, Hulunbuir, Ulaanbaatar, Arkhangai, Altay Mountains, Beshbalik, Dzungaria, Samarkand and arrived at Hindu Kush of Afghanistan in 1222 and presented himself before Genghis Khan.

The journey to Central Asia and back took three years, from 1220 to 1224. The record was written by a disciple Li Zhichang (李志常), who accompanied Qiu on the journey. The Travels consisted of two parts, the first part described the details of the travel to the west; the second part contains an account of Qiu's meeting with Genghis Khan and his journey back to Beijing.

The Travels was published by another disciple, Sun Xi (孫錫), with a preface dated 1228. The Travels was included in the Daozang (道藏 Depository of Taoist works). In 1795, Qing dynasty scholars Qian Daxin and Duan Yucai rediscovered it from the Daozang in the Xuanmiao Taoist Temple (玄妙觀) in Suzhou. Qian Daxin then hand copied this work and distributed it.

== Translations ==
The Travels was first translated into Russian by the Archimandrite of Russian Orthodox Church Pekin Eccles Mission Palladius Kafarov in 1866.

In 1867, M. Pauthier translated to French an abridged version of the Travels from Wei Yuan's Illustrated Treatise on the Maritime Kingdoms (Haiguo tuzhi).

In 1888, Dr. Emil Bretschneider, a Baltic German physician posted to the Russian Legation in Beijing, published an English translation of the Travels.

An English translation by Arthur Waley was published in 1931 as The Travels of an Alchemist - The Journey of the Taoist Ch'ang-Ch'un from China to the Hindukush at the Summons of Chingiz Khan.

A new annotated English translation by Ruth Dunnell, Stephen West, and Shao-yun Yang was published in 2023 as Daoist Master Changchun's Journey to the West: To the Court of Chinggis Qan and Back (Hsu-Tang Library of Classical Chinese Literature, Oxford University Press). Unlike the translations by Bretschneider and Waley, this translation includes all of Qiu Chuji's poems. Yang also produced an illustrated StoryMap supplement to the translation, accessible at https://arcg.is/1vC1Pv0

== Secret History ==
In 1228, Qiu Chuji's disciple, Li Zhichang, published the Travels providing only a superficial account of his master's journey and conversations, excluding many confidential portions.

Yelü Chucai, minister of Genghis Khan, few years later published Records of the Auspicious Gathering with the Mysterious Wind (the english translation is included in). This work includes some of the conversation happened between Qiu Chuji and Genghis Khan. Nevertheless, most of the content shared between the two has never been divulged since it was considered secret and therefore kept confidential, only transmitted orally within the inner circle of Qiu Chuji and Genghis Khan respectively.

Taoist master Wang Liping, the 18th successor of the Longmen Quanzhen Taoism of Qiu Chuji, in 2022 published in China the Perfected Changchun’s Journey to the West (长春真人西游记 Changchun Zhenren Xiyouji) which delves into the secrets behind the meeting of Qiu Chuji and Genghis Khan—including matters of the Quanzhen Longmen school that are unknown to the public. In 2026, this book has been translated and published in English as Perfected Changchun’s Journey to the West: One word stops the killing.

== In popular culture ==
A 2013 Chinese film, An End to Killing, is a rendition of this story.
