= Aana Marutha =

Character in Indian mythology

Aana Marutha (Malayalam: ആനമറുത) is a mythological figure popular in the Indian state of Kerala. Aana Marutha is often depicted as a bloodsucking evil spirit. She seduces lonely people before attacking them and draining their blood. Aana Marutha is described as having fangs and bloodshot eyes. She is said to leave backwards footprints.

The 2021 short film Kandittund! (Seen It!) from Studio Eeksaurus describes Aana Marutha as a one-and-a-half foot tall elephant-like creature with an iron chain around its ankle.

== See also ==
- Yakshi
- Karuthachan
- Muthappan
